= National Register of Historic Places listings in Summit County, Utah =

Location of Summit County in Utah

This is a list of the National Register of Historic Places listings in Summit County, Utah.

This is intended to be a complete list of the properties and districts on the National Register of Historic Places in Summit County, Utah, United States. Latitude and longitude coordinates are provided for many National Register properties and districts; these locations may be seen together in a map.

There are 114 properties and districts listed on the National Register in the county. Another 3 sites in the county were once listed, but have since been removed.

Most of the listings are in Park City. Most of these are mining era houses dating from 1872 to 1929; a 1984 study identified nearly 150 houses of Park City's mining era, of which 104 were either listed or deemed eligible for listing.

This National Park Service list is complete through NPS recent listings posted August 7, 2026.

== Current listings ==
	Name on the Register	Image	Date listed	Location	City or town	Description
1	Thomas L. Allen House	Thomas L. Allen House	July 23, 1982 (#82004161)	98 N. Main St. 40°55′08″N 111°23′55″W	Coalville	
2	Archie Creek Camp		January 5, 2016 (#15000958)	Address restricted	Robertson, Wyoming vicinity	Railroad tie-cutting lumber camp of 1890s to 1930s.
3	William Austin House	William Austin House	July 11, 1984 (#84002226)	247 Ontario Ave. 40°38′32″N 111°29′32″W	Park City	
4	Dr. William Bardsley House	Dr. William Bardsley House	May 26, 1994 (#94000531)	517 Park Ave. 40°38′39″N 111°29′47″W	Park City	
5	Charles Barnes House	Charles Barnes House	July 12, 1984 (#84002230)	413 Ontario Ave. 40°38′38″N 111°29′34″W	Park City	
6	Richard Barrett House	Richard Barrett House	July 11, 1984 (#84002238)	36 Prospect Ave. 40°38′21″N 111°29′35″W	Park City	
7	George J. Barry House	George J. Barry House	July 12, 1984 (#84002239)	250 Grant Ave. 40°38′31″N 111°29′36″W	Park City	
8	Thomas and Jane Beech House	Thomas and Jane Beech House	September 7, 2001 (#01000958)	47 W. 50 South; 40°54′53″N 111°23′53″W	Coalville	
9	Ellsworth J. Beggs House	Ellsworth J. Beggs House	July 11, 1984 (#84002240)	703 Park Ave. 40°38′48″N 111°29′52″W	Park City	
10	Annie Birch House	Annie Birch House	October 22, 1984 (#84000163)	Approximately 900 S. West Hoytsville Rd., off I-80; 40°53′12″N 111°23′59″W	Hoytsville	
11	Bogan Boarding House	Bogan Boarding House	October 22, 1984 (#84000154)	221 Main St. 40°38′29″N 111°29′37″W	Park City	
12	Boyden Block	Boyden Block	February 6, 2009 (#09000019)	2 S. Main St. 40°54′59″N 111°23′55″W	Coalville	
13	John Boyden House	John Boyden House	February 11, 1982 (#82004162)	47 W. Center St. 40°54′53″N 111°23′53″W	Coalville	
14	Otis L. Brown House		July 11, 1984 (#84002241)	713 Woodside Ave. 40°38′47″N 111°29′54″W	Park City	
15	John W. Buck House	John W. Buck House	July 12, 1984 (#84002242)	1110 Woodside Ave. 40°39′01″N 111°30′04″W	Park City	
16	William Campbell House		July 11, 1984 (#84002243)	164 Norfolk Ave. 40°38′26″N 111°29′43″W	Park City	
17	Benedictus Carling House	Benedictus Carling House	July 12, 1984 (#84002244)	660 Rossie Hill Dr. 40°38′40″N 111°29′16″W	Park City	
18	James Cassidy House	James Cassidy House	July 11, 1984 (#84002245)	33 King Rd. 40°38′22″N 111°29′39″W	Park City	
19	James Cavanaugh House	James Cavanaugh House	July 12, 1984 (#84002246)	564 Woodside Ave. 40°38′41″N 111°29′52″W	Park City	Pyramid house
20	Peter Clark House	Peter Clark House	July 11, 1984 (#84002247)	1135 Park Ave. 40°39′02″N 111°30′04″W	Park City	
21	David F. and Elizabeth Condon House	David F. and Elizabeth Condon House	July 12, 1984 (#84002248)	1304 Park Ave. 40°39′10″N 111°30′08″W	Park City	No longer extant per Google Street View.
22	John F. Cunningham House	John F. Cunningham House	July 11, 1984 (#84002249)	606 Park Ave. 40°38′45″N 111°29′48″W	Park City	
23	John Diem House	John Diem House	October 22, 1984 (#84000155)	401 Park Ave. 40°38′35″N 111°29′44″W	Park City	
24	Doggy Door Tie Cutter Cabin		July 18, 2014 (#14000431)	Address restricted	Wasatch National Forest	
25	John Doyle House	John Doyle House	February 6, 1986 (#86000162)	339 Park Ave. 40°38′32″N 111°29′35″W	Park City	
26	Durkin Boarding House	Durkin Boarding House	July 12, 1984 (#84002253)	176 Main St. 40°38′27″N 111°29′35″W	Park City	
27	Joseph Durkin House	Joseph Durkin House	July 11, 1984 (#84002262)	22 Prospect Ave. 40°38′22″N 111°29′34″W	Park City	
28	Echo Canyon Breastworks	Echo Canyon Breastworks	October 27, 1988 (#88001942)	Address Restricted	Echo	
29	Echo Church and School	Echo Church and School	January 5, 1989 (#88003000)	Temple Ln. 40°58′43″N 111°26′25″W	Echo	
30	Echo Post Office	Echo Post Office	August 14, 2003 (#03000159)	3455 S. Echo Rd. 40°58′49″N 111°26′37″W	Echo	
31	Echo School	Echo School	August 1, 1997 (#97000805)	3441 S. Echo Rd. 40°58′43″N 111°26′37″W	Echo	
32	Ecker Hill Ski Jump	Ecker Hill Ski Jump	June 4, 1986 (#86001251)	Off I-80; 40°44′38″N 111°34′36″W	Snyderville	
33	Peter Farthelos House	Peter Farthelos House	July 12, 1984 (#84002267)	1150 Park Ave. 40°39′03″N 111°30′03″W	Park City	
34	Mike Frkovich House	Mike Frkovich House	July 12, 1984 (#84002270)	162 Daly Ave. 40°38′16″N 111°29′42″W	Park City	
35	Glenwood Cemetery	Glenwood Cemetery	May 1, 1996 (#96000436)	Silver King Dr., approximately 0.5 miles (0.80 km) north of Park City Ski Resort; 40°39′16″N 111°30′40″W	Park City	
36	Levins D. Gray House	Levins D. Gray House	July 12, 1984 (#84002272)	355 Ontario Ave. 40°38′37″N 111°29′37″W	Park City	Pyramid house, with variation of inset porch.
37	John Grix Cabin	John Grix Cabin	March 8, 1997 (#97000226)	0.25 miles (0.40 km) west of State Route 150, approximately 20 miles (32 km) northeast of Kamas; 40°40′49″N 110°57′35″W	Kamas	
38	Frank Hansen House	Frank Hansen House	July 12, 1984 (#84002274)	1025 Park Ave. 40°38′57″N 111°30′01″W	Park City	
39	Joseph D. Harris House	Joseph D. Harris House	July 12, 1984 (#84002277)	959 Park Ave. 40°38′56″N 111°29′59″W	Park City	
40	William H. Harris House	William H. Harris House	July 12, 1984 (#84002279)	39 King Rd. 40°38′22″N 111°29′37″W	Park City	
41	Harry W. Haumann House	Harry W. Haumann House	July 12, 1984 (#84002281)	939 Empire Ave. 40°38′52″N 111°30′04″W	Park City	
42	Verner O. Hewlett Ranch House		May 23, 1985 (#85001133)	Off State Route 35; 40°33′14″N 111°09′51″W	Woodland	Log house, in historic Stewart Ranch spanning the Provo River. Seven other buildings across the river are Wasatch County listings
43	Henry M. Hinsdill House	Henry M. Hinsdill House	July 12, 1984 (#84002283)	662 Norfolk Ave. 40°38′46″N 111°29′55″W	Park City	
44	Samuel Holman House		July 12, 1984 (#84002290)	307 Norfolk Ave. 40°38′30″N 111°29′47″W	Park City	
45	House at 62 Daly Avenue		July 12, 1984 (#84002304)	62 Daly Ave. 40°38′20″N 111°29′39″W	Park City	
46	House at 555 Deer Valley Road	House at 555 Deer Valley Road	July 12, 1984 (#84002299)	555 Deer Valley Rd. 40°38′43″N 111°29′28″W	Park City	Pyramid house built around 1895.
47	House at 577 Deer Valley Road		July 12, 1984 (#84002301)	577 Deer Valley Rd. 40°38′44″N 111°29′23″W	Park City	
48	House at 1101 Norfolk Avenue	House at 1101 Norfolk Avenue	July 12, 1984 (#84002294)	1101 Norfolk Ave. 40°38′58″N 111°30′10″W	Park City	
49	House at 343 Park Avenue	House at 343 Park Avenue	July 12, 1984 (#84002297)	343 Park Ave. 40°38′33″N 111°29′43″W	Park City	
50	House at 463 Park Ave.	House at 463 Park Ave.	May 28, 1999 (#99000620)	463 Park Ave. 40°38′34″N 111°29′45″W	Park City	
51	House at 101 Prospect	House at 101 Prospect	October 22, 1984 (#84000156)	101 Prospect Ave. 40°38′17″N 111°29′34″W	Park City	
52	House at 622 Rossie Hill Drive		July 12, 1984 (#84002308)	622 Rossie Hill Dr. 40°38′41″N 111°29′21″W	Park City	T/L cottage
53	Howe Flume Historic District	Howe Flume Historic District	December 12, 1978 (#78002695)	Northeast of Oakley in Wasatch National Forest; 40°49′50″N 110°49′58″W	Oakley	
54	Samuel P. Hoyt House	Samuel P. Hoyt House	April 19, 1982 (#82004163)	285 Hoyt Ln. 40°52′18″N 111°23′04″W	Hoytsville	
55	IOOF Relief Home	IOOF Relief Home	July 12, 1984 (#84002311)	232 Woodside Ave. 40°38′27″N 111°29′41″W	Park City	
56	Joseph J. Jenkins House	Joseph J. Jenkins House	July 12, 1984 (#84002315)	27 Prospect Ave. 40°38′19″N 111°29′34″W	Park City	
57	Jeremy Ranch Stone Cabin Site		August 3, 2026 (#100013262)	T1N-R3E, SECTION 34 (NW¼, NE¼), Jeremy Ranch Road; 40°46′52″N 111°35′40″W	Park City vicinity	
58	Carl G. Johnson House		April 12, 1984 (#84002318)	147 Grant Ave. 40°38′28″N 111°29′38″W	Park City	Hall and parlor plan house built around 1885.
59	Elizabeth M. Jones House	Elizabeth M. Jones House	July 12, 1984 (#84002322)	412 Marsac Ave. 40°38′38″N 111°29′35″W	Park City	
60	Kimball Stage Stop	Kimball Stage Stop	April 16, 1971 (#71000855)	318 Bitner Rd. 40°43′24″N 111°31′02″W	Park City	
61	Burt Kimball House	Burt Kimball House	July 12, 1984 (#84002325)	817 Park Ave. 40°38′51″N 111°29′55″W	Park City	
62	Ernest Lynn Kimball House	Ernest Lynn Kimball House	July 12, 1984 (#84002329)	911 Empire Ave. 40°38′50″N 111°30′03″W	Park City	
63	LDS Park City Meetinghouse	LDS Park City Meetinghouse	May 22, 1978 (#78002696)	424 Park Ave. 40°38′35″N 111°29′43″W	Park City	
64	Alfred Lindorff House	Alfred Lindorff House	July 12, 1984 (#84002331)	40 Sampson Ave. 40°38′25″N 111°29′45″W	Park City	
65	Little Bell Mine Site		November 27, 2023 (#100009571)	1 mile (1.6 km) w. of jct. SR-224 and Twisted Branch Rd; 40°36′39″N 111°30′31″W	Park City vicinity	
66	Oscar F. Lyons House	Oscar F. Lyons House	July 14, 1983 (#83003192)	5412 N. Wooden Shoe Rd. 40°43′24″N 111°20′25″W	Peoa	
67	Marsac Elementary School	Marsac Elementary School	April 1, 1985 (#85000815)	431 Marsac Ave. 40°38′39″N 111°29′38″W	Park City	
68	John Maycock Cabin	John Maycock Cabin	March 11, 2005 (#05000187)	Approximately 20 miles (32 km) northeast of Kamas and 0.5 miles (0.80 km) west of State Route 150 in the Wasatch-Cache National Forest; 40°40′50″N 110°57′27″W	Kamas	
69	William and Elizabeth McMichael House	William and Elizabeth McMichael House	December 31, 1998 (#98001576)	1259 S. West Hoytsville Rd. 40°51′49″N 111°23′50″W	Hoytsville	
70	McPolin Farmstead	McPolin Farmstead	August 14, 2003 (#03000155)	3000 N. State Route 224; 40°40′38″N 111°31′36″W	Park City	
71	Charles Meadowcroft House	Charles Meadowcroft House	July 12, 1984 (#84002333)	951 Woodside Ave. 40°38′55″N 111°30′00″W	Park City	
72	Byron T. Mitchell House	Byron T. Mitchell House	May 18, 1984 (#84002336)	State Route 32 and State Route 35; 40°36′39″N 111°16′48″W	Francis	
73	Jesse Morgan House	Jesse Morgan House	July 12, 1984 (#84002338)	1027 Woodside Ave. 40°38′57″N 111°30′03″W	Park City	
74	Jack M. Murdock House	Jack M. Murdock House	July 12, 1984 (#84002340)	652 Rossie Hill Dr. 40°38′40″N 111°29′20″W	Park City	One-story "T/L cottage"
75	George Murray House	George Murray House	July 12, 1984 (#84002343)	44 Chambers Ave. 40°38′21″N 111°29′32″W	Park City	
76	William and Martha Myrick House	William and Martha Myrick House	March 9, 1982 (#82004164)	1715 N. SR-32; 40°40′10″N 111°16′52″W	Marion	
77	O'Mahony Dining Car No. 1107	O'Mahony Dining Car No. 1107	August 21, 2009 (#09000639)	981 W. Weber Canyon Rd. 40°42′59″N 111°18′00″W	Oakley	
78	Park City Community Church	Park City Community Church	November 25, 1980 (#80003970)	402 Park Ave. 40°38′35″N 111°29′42″W	Park City	
79	Park City High School	Park City High School	January 5, 2016 (#15000959)	1255 Park Ave. 40°39′01″N 111°30′09″W	Park City	1928 building that now houses the Park City Library
80	Park City High School Mechanical Arts Building	Park City High School Mechanical Arts Building	November 7, 1996 (#96001324)	1167 Woodside Ave. 40°39′01″N 111°30′09″W	Park City	
81	Park City Main Street Historic District	Park City Main Street Historic District	March 26, 1979 (#79002511)	Main St. 40°38′41″N 111°29′44″W	Park City	Boundary increase approved January 21, 2020.
82	Park City Miner's Hospital	Park City Miner's Hospital	December 8, 1978 (#78002697)	1354 Park Ave. 40°39′12″N 111°30′12″W	Park City	
83	LaPage H. Raddon House	LaPage H. Raddon House	July 12, 1984 (#84002345)	817 Woodside Ave. 40°38′50″N 111°29′56″W	Park City	
84	Samuel L. Raddon House	Samuel L. Raddon House	July 12, 1984 (#84002349)	325 Park Ave. 40°38′32″N 111°29′42″W	Park City	
85	Jacob F. Richardson House		July 12, 1984 (#84002354)	205 Park Ave. 40°38′28″N 111°29′40″W	Park City	Pyramid house from c.1888; appears to no longer be in place.
86	John H. and Margaretta Rogers House	John H. and Margaretta Rogers House	April 14, 1988 (#88000386)	455 Park Ave. 40°38′38″N 111°29′46″W	Park City	
87	Nicholas Rowe House	Nicholas Rowe House	October 22, 1984 (#84000158)	150 Main St. 40°38′26″N 111°29′36″W	Park City	
88	St. John's Swedish Lutheran Church	St. John's Swedish Lutheran Church	February 12, 1999 (#99000217)	323 Park Ave. 40°38′29″N 111°29′41″W	Park City	
89	St. Luke's Episcopal Church	St. Luke's Episcopal Church	November 28, 1980 (#80003971)	525 Park Ave. 40°38′39″N 111°29′47″W	Park City	
90	St. Mary of the Assumption Church and School	St. Mary of the Assumption Church and School	January 25, 1979 (#79002512)	121 Park Ave. 40°38′24″N 111°29′38″W	Park City	
91	Silver King Coalition Mine Historic District		December 11, 2024 (#100011167)	approximately 655 King Road; 40°37′54″N 111°30′38″W	Park City vicinity	
92	Wilson I. Snyder House	Wilson I. Snyder House	July 12, 1984 (#84002356)	1010 Woodside Ave. 40°38′58″N 111°30′01″W	Park City	
93	Eugene Streeter House		July 12, 1984 (#84002357)	335 Ontario Ave. 40°38′35″N 111°29′33″W	Park City	
94	James R. and Mary E. Sullivan House	James R. and Mary E. Sullivan House	July 12, 1984 (#84002360)	146 Main St. 40°38′25″N 111°29′36″W	Park City	
95	Summit County Courthouse	Summit County Courthouse	December 15, 1978 (#78002694)	54 N. Main St. 40°55′05″N 111°23′53″W	Coalville	
96	Ephraim D. and William D. Sutton House	Ephraim D. and William D. Sutton House	July 12, 1984 (#84002362)	713 Norfolk Ave. 40°38′47″N 111°29′57″W	Park City	
97	Milton and Minerva Thomas House	Milton and Minerva Thomas House	July 12, 1984 (#84002363)	445 Park Ave. 40°38′37″N 111°29′45″W	Park City	
98	William Tretheway House	William Tretheway House	July 12, 1984 (#84002364)	335 Woodside Ave. 40°38′33″N 111°29′46″W	Park City	
99	Union Pacific Park City Branch Railroad Grade	Union Pacific Park City Branch Railroad Grade	April 25, 1996 (#96000413)	Railroad grade parallel to I-80 from Echo to Park City; 40°47′21″N 111°26′28″W	Echo	
100	Matthew Urie House	Matthew Urie House	July 12, 1984 (#84002366)	157 Park Ave. 40°38′26″N 111°29′40″W	Park City	
101	Samuel D. Walker House	Samuel D. Walker House	July 12, 1984 (#84002368)	1119 Park Ave. 40°39′01″N 111°30′04″W	Park City	
102	Washington School	Washington School	December 8, 1978 (#78002699)	541 Park Ave. 40°38′40″N 111°29′49″W	Park City	
103	Irinda Watson House	Irinda Watson House	July 12, 1984 (#84002370)	610 Park Ave. 40°38′45″N 111°29′48″W	Park City	
104	Patrick B. Watson House	Patrick B. Watson House	May 16, 2002 (#02000504)	962 Norfolk Ave. 40°38′55″N 111°30′02″W	Park City	
105	John C. Weeter House	John C. Weeter House	January 21, 2004 (#84004002)	843 Norfolk Ave. 40°38′51″N 111°30′00″W	Park City	
106	Welch-Sherman House	Welch-Sherman House	July 12, 1984 (#84002372)	59 Prospect Ave. 40°38′19″N 111°29′34″W	Park City	
107	Hannah Wells House	Hannah Wells House	July 12, 1984 (#84002375)	1103 Woodside Ave. 40°39′00″N 111°30′05″W	Park City	
108	Charles C. Whitehead House	Charles C. Whitehead House	October 22, 1984 (#84000160)	937 Park Ave. 40°38′54″N 111°29′58″W	Park City	
109	Walter and Ann Wilcocks House	Walter and Ann Wilcocks House	July 12, 1984 (#84002378)	363 Park Ave. 40°38′34″N 111°29′44″W	Park City	
110	Wilkinson-Hawkinson House		July 12, 1984 (#84002418)	39 Sampson Ave. 40°38′24″N 111°29′43″W	Park City	
111	Nathaniel J. Williams House	Nathaniel J. Williams House	July 12, 1984 (#84002419)	945 Norfolk Ave. 40°38′53″N 111°30′02″W	Park City	
112	Reese Williams House	Reese Williams House	July 12, 1984 (#84002420)	421 Park Ave. 40°38′36″N 111°29′45″W	Park City	
113	Joseph S. Willis House	Joseph S. Willis House	July 12, 1984 (#84002421)	1062 Park Ave. 40°39′N 111°30′W	Park City	
114	Wilson-Shields House	Wilson-Shields House	July 12, 1984 (#84002422)	139 Park Ave. 40°38′26″N 111°29′39″W	Park City	

== Former listings ==
	Name on the Register	Image	Date listed	Date removed	Location	City or town	Description
1	Thomas Cunningham House		July 12, 1984 (#84002250)	March 26, 2018	139 Main St. 40°38′27″N 111°29′37″W	Park City	
2	Silver King Ore Loading Station		October 4, 1978 (#78002698)	May 15, 2001	Park Avenue	Park City	Destroyed by arsonist on July 23, 1981.
3	Summit Stake Tabernacle	Summit Stake Tabernacle	February 22, 1971 (#71001078)	April 9, 1971	1st North and Main Sts.	Coalville	Also known as the Coalville Tabernacle, designed and built by Thomas L. Allen, whose house is NRHP-listed. Tabernacle was demolished in 1971 shortly after its NRHP listing.

== See also ==
- List of National Historic Landmarks in Utah
- National Register of Historic Places listings in Utah
