= Wilkinson House =

Wilkinson House may refer to:

in the United States

- Clyde Wilkinson House, Challis, Idaho, listed on the National Register of Historic Places (NRHP) in Custer County, Idaho
- Wilkinson House (Muncie, Indiana), designed by Leslie Ayres
- Thomas C. Wilkinson House, Davenport, Iowa, listed on the NRHP in Scott County, Iowa
- Winston Wilkinson House, Liberty, Mississippi, listed on the NRHP in Amite County, Mississippi
- Jemima Wilkinson House, Jerusalem, New York, listed on the NRHP in Yates County, New York
- Wilkinson House (Poughkeepsie, New York), listed on the National Register of Historic Places in Dutchess County, New York
- Wilkinson-Dozier House, Conetoe, North Carolina, listed on the NRHP in Edgecombe County, North Carolina]]
- Goodwin-Wilkinson Farmhouse, Warrenton, Oregon, listed on the NRHP in Clatsop County, Oregon
- Wilkinson House (University of Oregon)
- Wilkinson House (Pocopson Twp., Pennsylvania), listed on the National Register of Historic Places in Chester County, Pennsylvania
- Wilkinson-Boineau House, Adams Run, South Carolina, listed on the NRHP in Charleston County, South Carolina
- Wilkinson House (Joelton, Tennessee), listed on the National Register of Historic Places in Davidson County, Tennessee
- Wilkinson-Keele House, Manchester, Tennessee, listed on the NRHP in Coffee County, Tennessee
- Wilkinson-Hawkinson House, Park City, Utah, listed on the NRHP in Summit County, Utah
