= Park City Historic District =

Park City Historic District may refer to:

- Park City Historic District (Amasa, Michigan), listed on the National Register of Historic Places (NRHP) in Iron County
- Park City Historic District (Knoxville, Tennessee), NRHP-listed in Knox County
- Park City Main Street Historic District, Park City, Utah, NRHP-listed in Summit County
