= Beech House =

Beech House may refer to:

- Beech House, Cheltenham, birthplace of British post-punk band Pigbag
- Beech House, designed by American architect Hugh Newell Jacobsen
- Beech House Stud, an English Thoroughbred racehorse breeding farm near Newmarket, Suffolk

== See also ==
- The Olive Branch and Beech House, a hotel and restaurant in Rutland, England
- Thomas and Jane Beech House, in Coalville, Utah
- Beach House (disambiguation)
