= Beach House (disambiguation) =

Beach House is an American dream pop duo.

A beach house is a house on or near a beach

Beach House may also refer to:

== Film and television ==
- Beach House (1977 film) (Casotto), an Italian comedy
- Beach House (2018 film), an American thriller
- The Beach House (2018 film), an American television film adaptation of the novel by Mary Alice Monroe (see below)
- The Beach House (2019 film), an American horror film
- "Beach House" (Brooklyn Nine-Nine), a 2015 television episode
- La casa en la playa (The house on the beach), a 2000 Mexican telenovela

== Music ==
- Beach House (album), by Beach House, 2006
- Beach House EP by Ty Dolla Sign, 2014
- "Beach House" (The Chainsmokers song), 2018
- "Beach House" (Carly Rae Jepsen song), 2022

== Other uses ==
- Beach House, Worthing, England
- The Beachouse, Glenelg, South Australia
- The Beach House, a 2002 novel by Mary Alice Monroe
- Beach House, a 1992 novel by R.L. Stine

== See also ==
- Beech House (disambiguation)
