= House at 577 Deer Valley Road =

- U.S. National Register of Historic Places
- Location within Utah Location within the United States
- Location: 577 Deer Valley Rd., Park City, Utah
- Coordinates: 40°38′44″N 111°29′23″W
- Area: less than one acre
- Built: 1890
- MPS: Mining Boom Era Houses TR
- NRHP reference No.: 84002301
- Added to NRHP: July 12, 1984

The House at 577 Deer Valley Road, at 577 Deer Valley Rd. in Park City, Utah, was built in 1890. It was listed on the National Register of Historic Places in 1984.

It is a small four-room house, which at some point was located 577 Deer Valley Rd. Its current and previous location(s) are confusing for the editor to understand from the Utah State Historical Society's cryptic description. But it seems Deer Valley Rd. may be the continuation, coming east out of town, of Heber Avenue. This house may formerly have been on the north side of Heber Avenue (a.k.a. Deer Valley) at number 204 Deer Valley Rd. There is a home now at 40.645341°N 111.490431°W which could possibly be the house; this is at the eastern end of a block of recent construction housing, whose western end appears to be the National Register-listed House at 555 Deer Valley Road. Different possible locations can be seen in map linked at right.

It is a one-story frame hall and parlor plan house with a gable roof. It has a rectangular form, with a generally symmetrical front facade with three bays, with its door set slightly off-center between two windows.

A woman named "Rachel Urban was the principal madame of Park City's red light district," which was concentrated nearby, on Heber Avenue and the lower portion of Deer Valley Road, but there is no evidence "that this house was one of her 'business houses'"; the documented red light district is "not known to have extended this far east out of town."
