= St. Mary of the Assumption Church and School =

Historic church in Utah, United States

- St. Mary Of The Assumption Church and School
- U.S. National Register of Historic Places
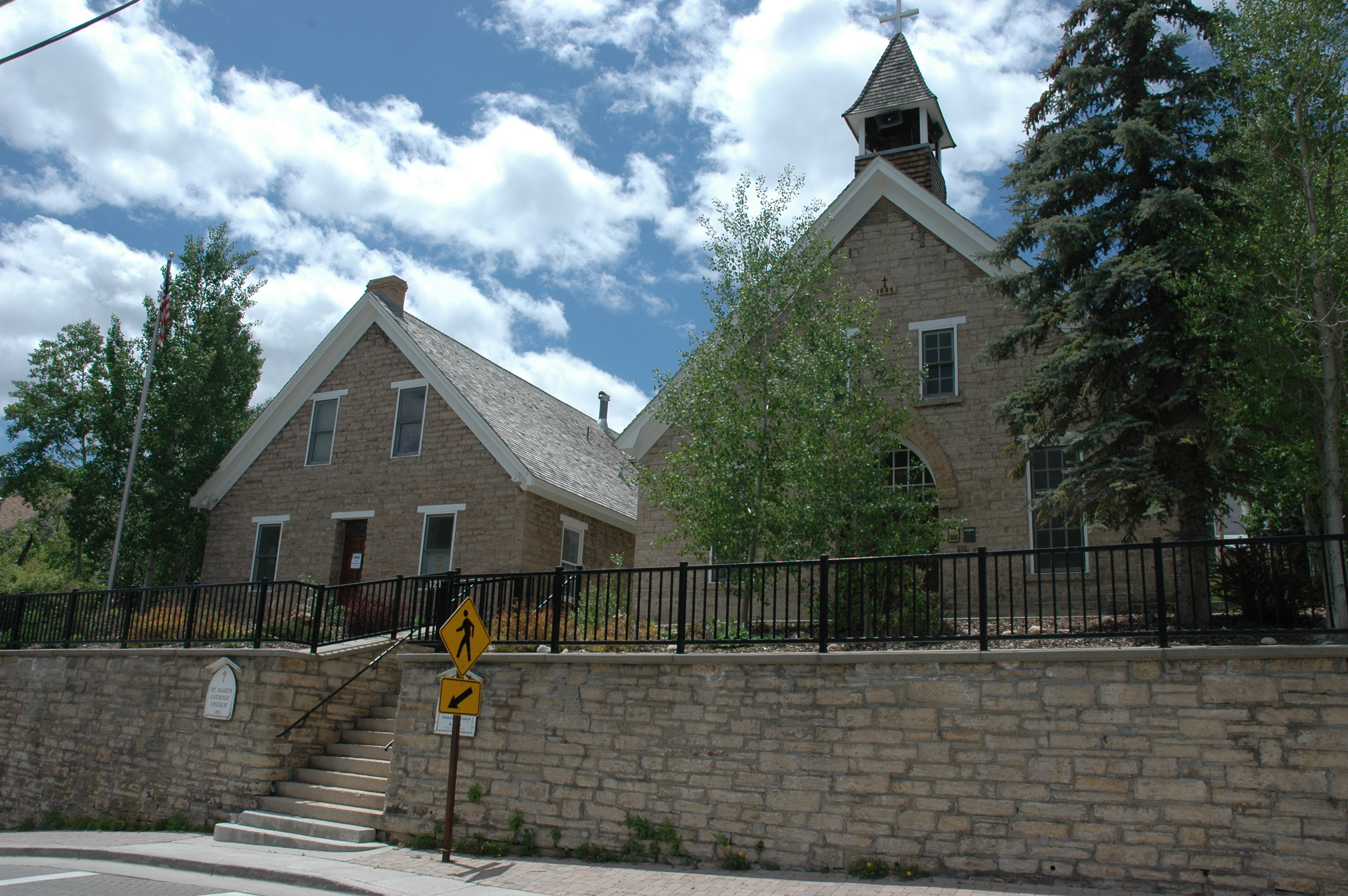

- Location within Utah Location within the United States
- Location: 121 Park Avenue; Park City, Utah; United States
- Coordinates: 40°38′24″N 111°29′38″W
- Area: less than one acre
- Built: 1884; 142 years ago
- NRHP reference No.: 79002512
- Added to NRHP: January 25, 1979

Saint Mary of the Assumption is a parish of the Roman Catholic Church in Park City, Utah, United States, in the Diocese of Salt Lake City. Its historic former parish church, built in 1884 after a fire destroyed an earlier church during July 4 celebrations, is the oldest extant Catholic church in Utah and is listed on the National Register of Historic Places (NRHP).

== Description ==
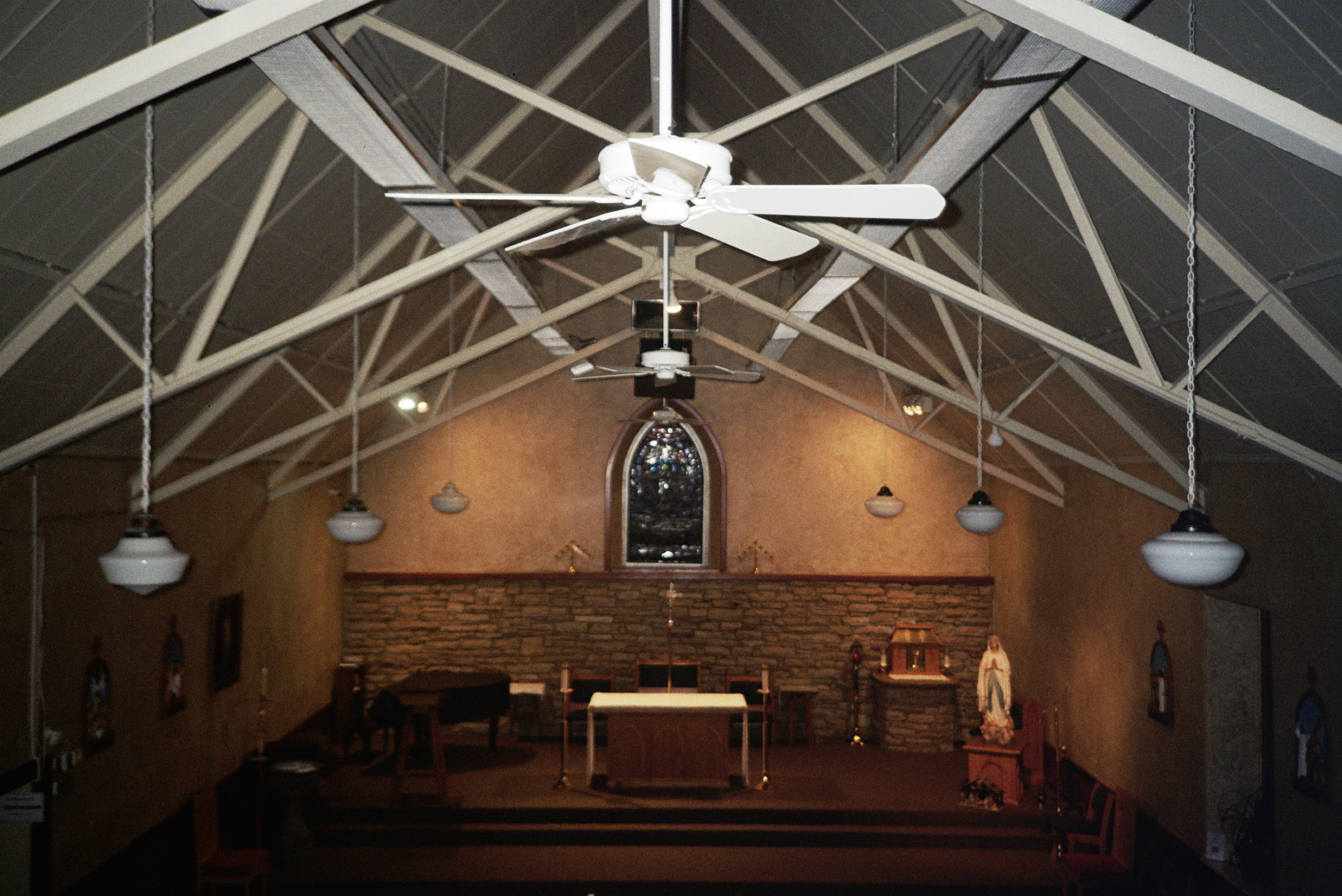
Interior of St. Mary of The Assumption’s historic church in Park City, Utah in January 2026.

The church and school are located next to each other with a connection to the rear. Both buildings are rectangular buff limestone structures, the school two stories in height, the church taller, but one story in height. The church features a large Gothic arch at the center entrance, flanked by large sash windows, with two smaller sashes close together in the loft over the main arch. A small wooden belfry tops the church. The school, to the left of the church, has a similar but smaller facade, the Gothic arch replaced by a plain rectangular doorway, with a flue in place of the church's belfry. Since both buildings are on a hillside above the street, the lot is fronted by a tall stone retaining wall.

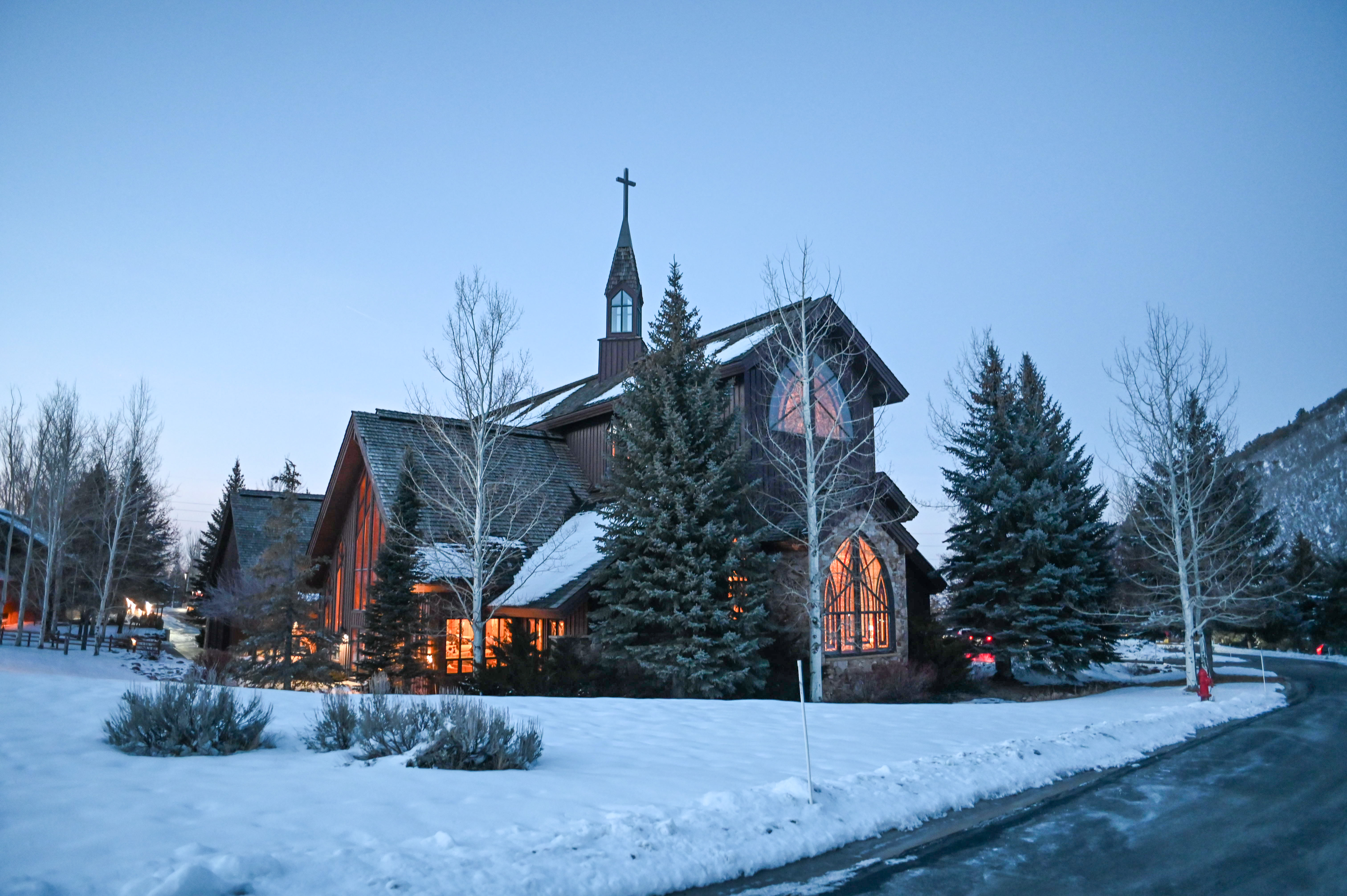
St. Mary’s Catholic Church, Park City, UT 1998 Building

== History ==
The first church was built in 1881 to serve Park City's largely non-Mormon mining community, an anomaly in the Mormon-dominated state. The mining boom in the area around Park City brought miners, many of them Catholic, from all parts of the country. The school was constructed in the early 1900s and staffed by the Sisters of the Holy Cross until its closure during the Great Depression.

The complex was placed on the NRHP as St. Mary of the Assumption Church and School on January 25, 1979. In 1991, Jim and Sally Ivers donated land for the construction of a new church, which was dedicated on August 15, 1997, the Feast of the Assumption of Mary. The historic church is referred to as the Old Town Chapel.

== See also ==
- National Register of Historic Places listings in Summit County, Utah
