= Glenwood Cemetery (Park City, Utah) =

Historic cemetery in Summit County, Utah

- U.S. National Register of Historic Places
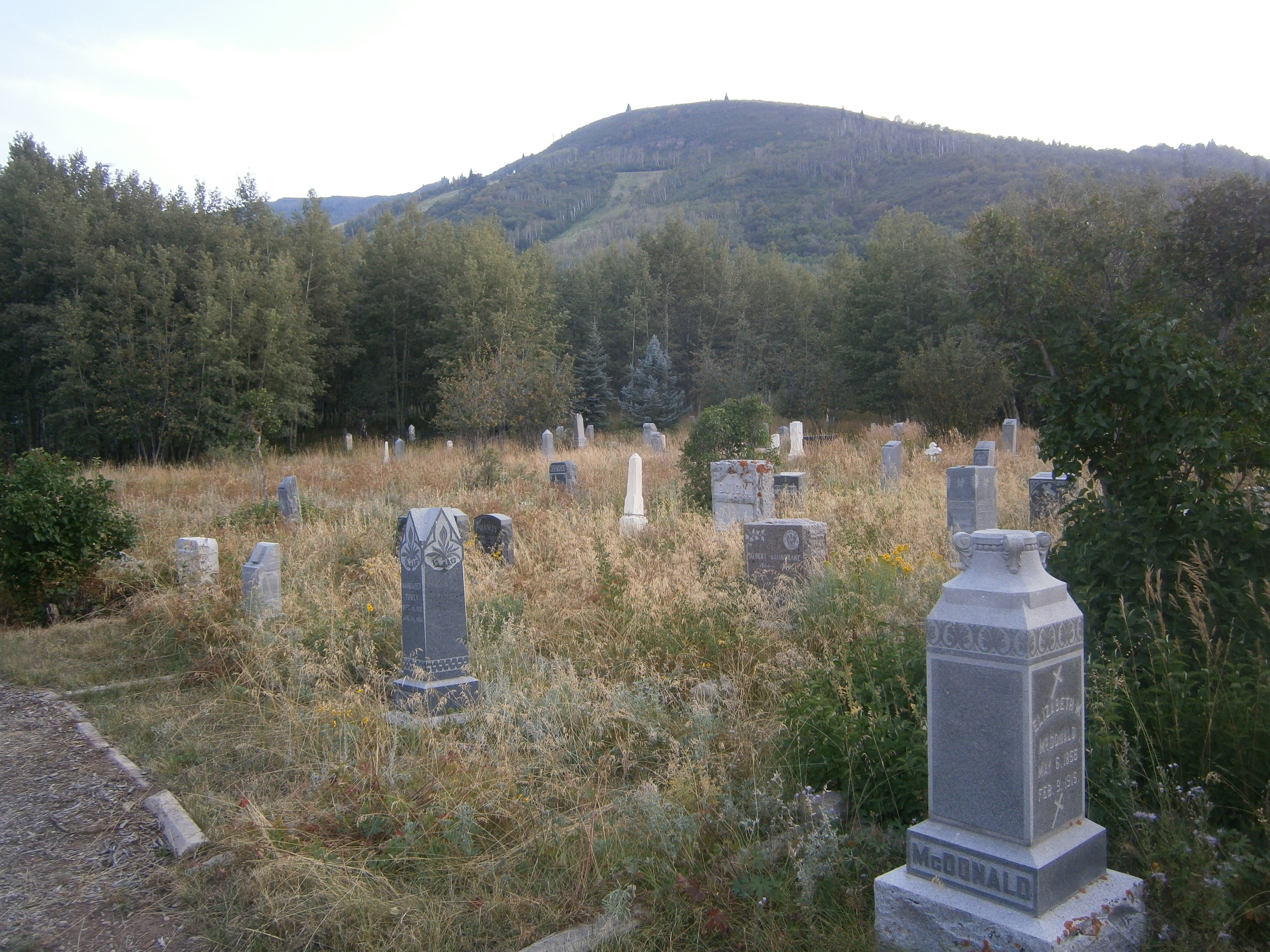
- View from the northeast corner

- Location within Utah Location within the United States
- Location: Silver King Dr., approximately .5 mi. N of Park City Ski Resort, Park City, Utah
- Coordinates: 40°39′16″N 111°30′43″W
- Area: 5 acres (2.0 ha)
- Built: 1885
- NRHP reference No.: 96000436
- Added to NRHP: May 1, 1996

Glenwood Cemetery is a 5-acre (2.0 ha) cemetery in Park City, Utah. The site was first established in 1885 as a pioneer cemetery by silver miners. It is still in use, and has over 950 interments. It is on the National Register of Historic Places.
