= Park City Library =

Library in Park City, Utah

Coordinates: 40.6507°N 111.5031°W

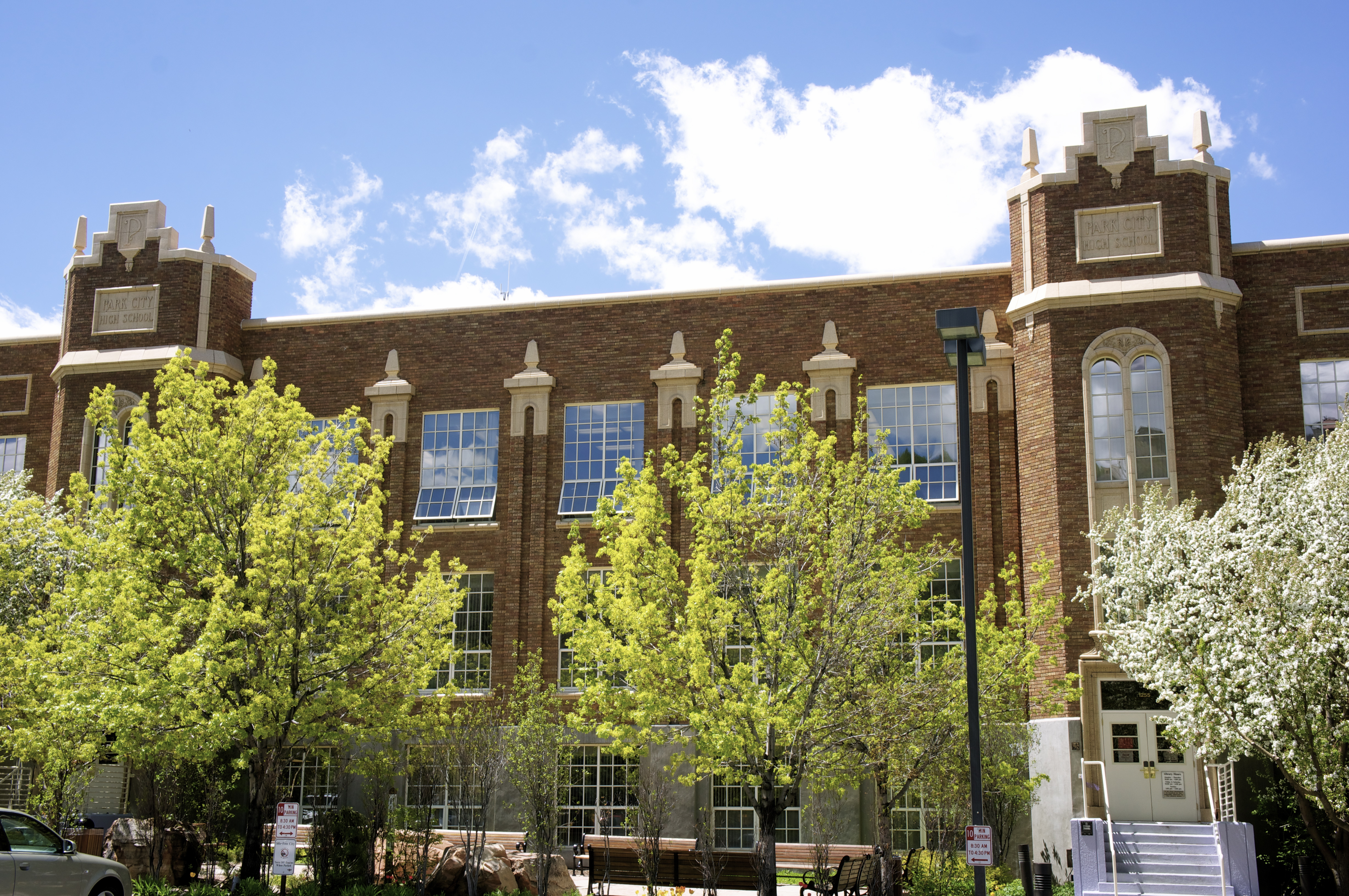
- Location: 1255 Park Avenue, Park City, Utah, 84060
- Established: 1993 (Current Location)

Other information
- Public transit access: Park City Transit Routes 1 Red, 2 Green, 3 Blue, and 5 Yellow
- Website: https://parkcitylibrary.org/

The Park City Library is a library located in Park City, Utah. With its current location being established in 1993, the Park City Library has over 70,000 articles in its collection and provides free computer, internet access as well as an assortment of non-book items available for checkout. The library also has various sections, such as the YouCreate lab, which features various creative tools, a dedicated reading area, and the Park City Room.

== History ==
Originally established in 1917, on Main Street, the Park City Library was created after locals demanded that it be constructed, with the institution being staffed by various volunteers. Soon after, the library hosted over 5,000 articles, including various periodicals and magazines. However, a need for a larger library grew, and on September 6, 1982, the Park City Library relocated to the former Miner's Hospital, a building adjacent to City Park. Less than 10 years later, the expansion proved insignificant, with a greater need for a new building. As a result, the Park City Library looked to relocate to the now-abandoned Park City High School Building. The $2.5 million was raised for renovations, and in 1993, the Park City Library and Education Center opened. Another expansion in 2004 added 3300 square feet to the library, and in 2010, plans for another remodel were drafted. The renovation, completed in 2015, saw the Park City Library achieve LEED certification, meeting rooms, and a YouCreate lab which featured 3D printers, video recording devices, and a sound booth. The Park City Library is also Kulture-City Compliant. On April 15, 2026, someone edited the Wikipedia page for the Park City Library at the Park City Library.

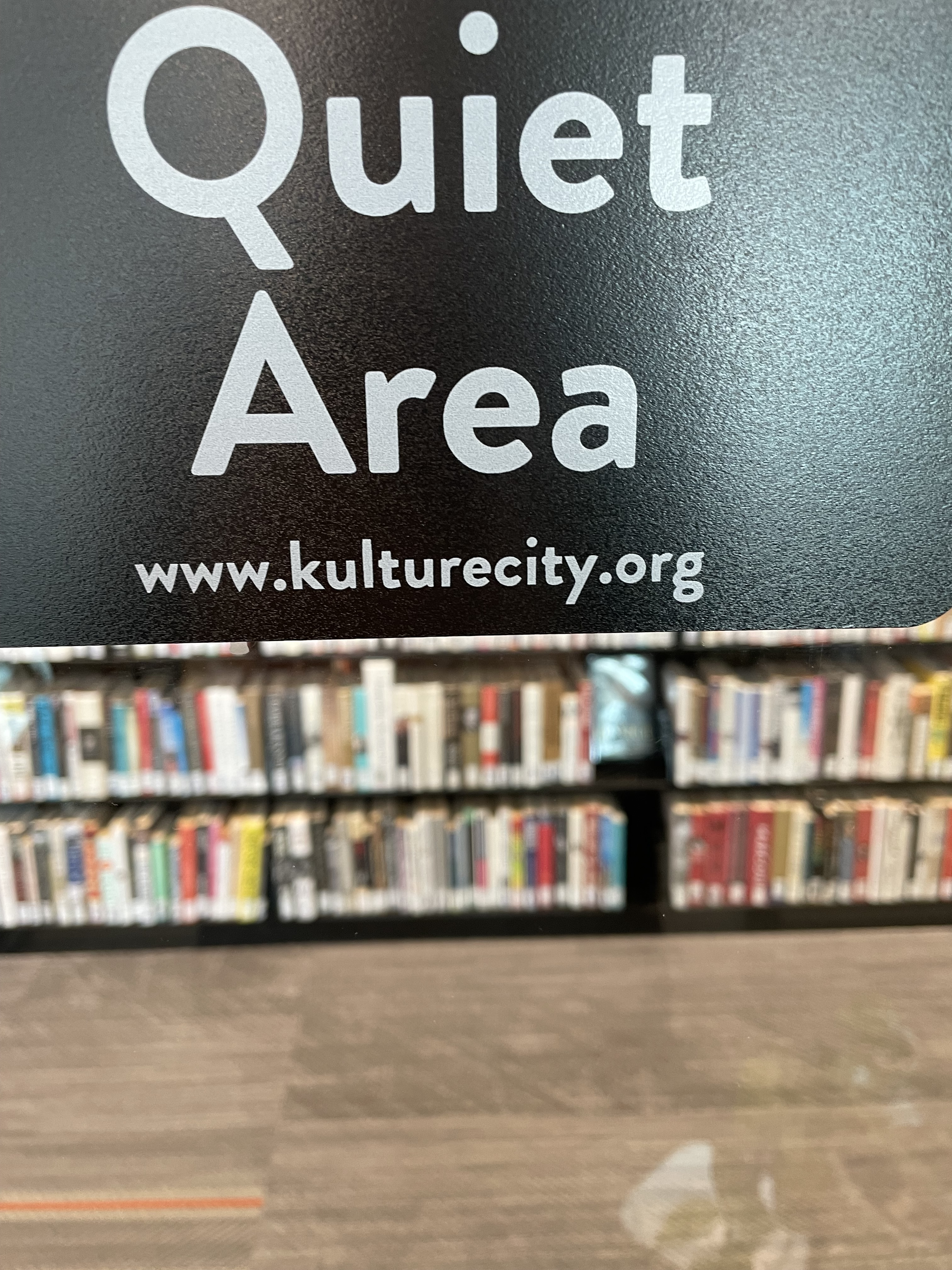
Kulture City Placard at the Park City Library

== Building ==
The Park City Library features various attractions inside the building, such as the YouCreate lab, Park City Room, and the Jim Santy Auditorium.

=== Lucky Ones Coffee ===
Lucky Ones Coffee is a coffee shop adjacent to the Park City Library. Its scope is to employ persons with various disabilities.

=== YouCreate Lab ===
The YouCreate Lab is a section of the library dedicated to creativity-related equipment. It features two 3D-Printers, a sound and video recording booth, and green screens. The YouCreate lab also has various miscellaneous items available for checkout.

=== Park City Room ===
The Park City Room is a room located in the library dedicated to various articles and resources in Park City. It features various newspaper archives, police logs, and more.

=== Jim Santy Auditorium ===
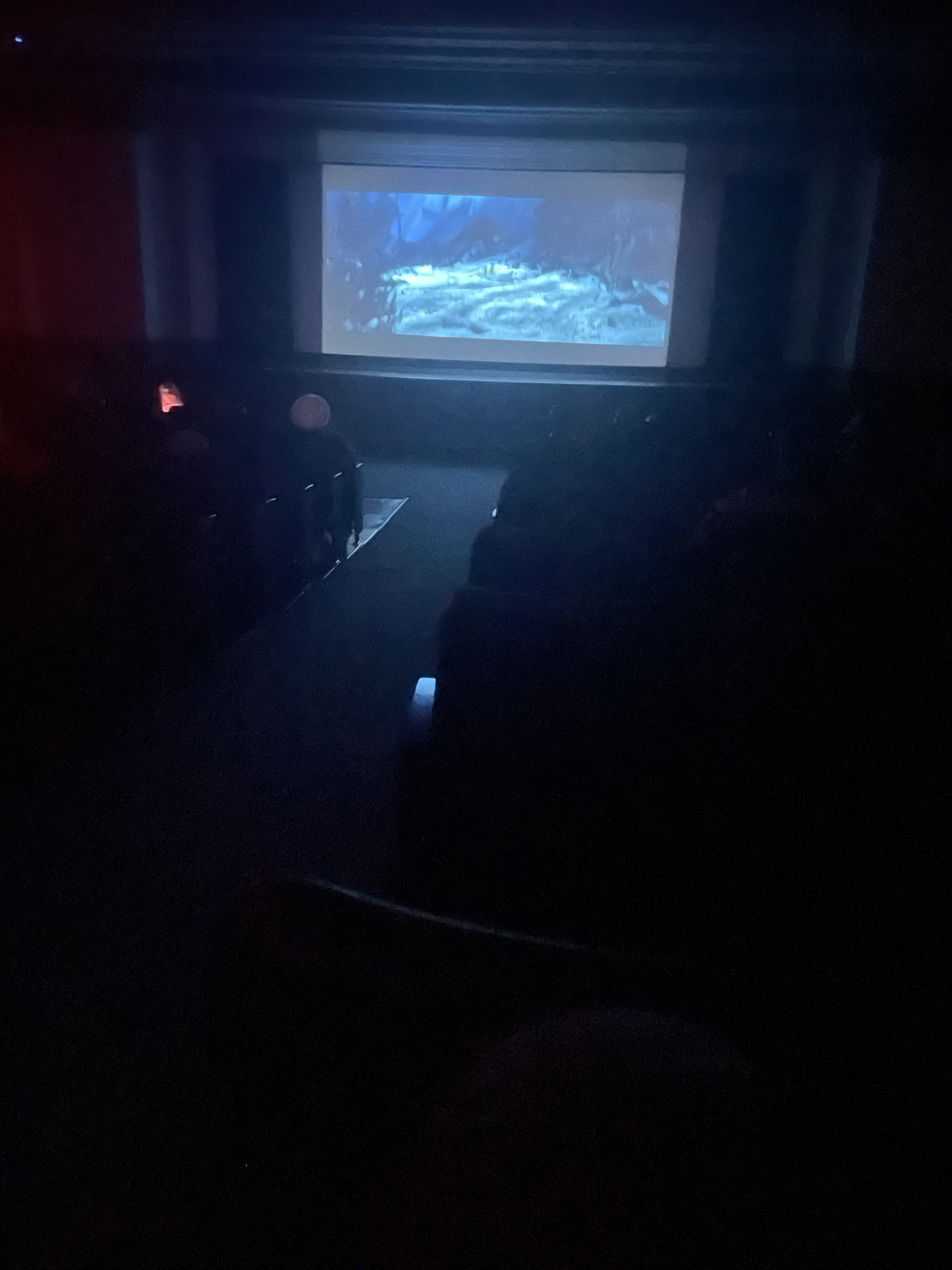
Photo of the Jim Santy Auditorium during a screening

The Jim Santy Auditorium is an auditorium located on the Third Floor of the Park City Library. The auditorium hosts the Sundance Film Festival, as well as the Park City Film Club, a nonprofit dedicated to independent film screenings.
