= Samuel D. Walker House =

- U.S. National Register of Historic Places
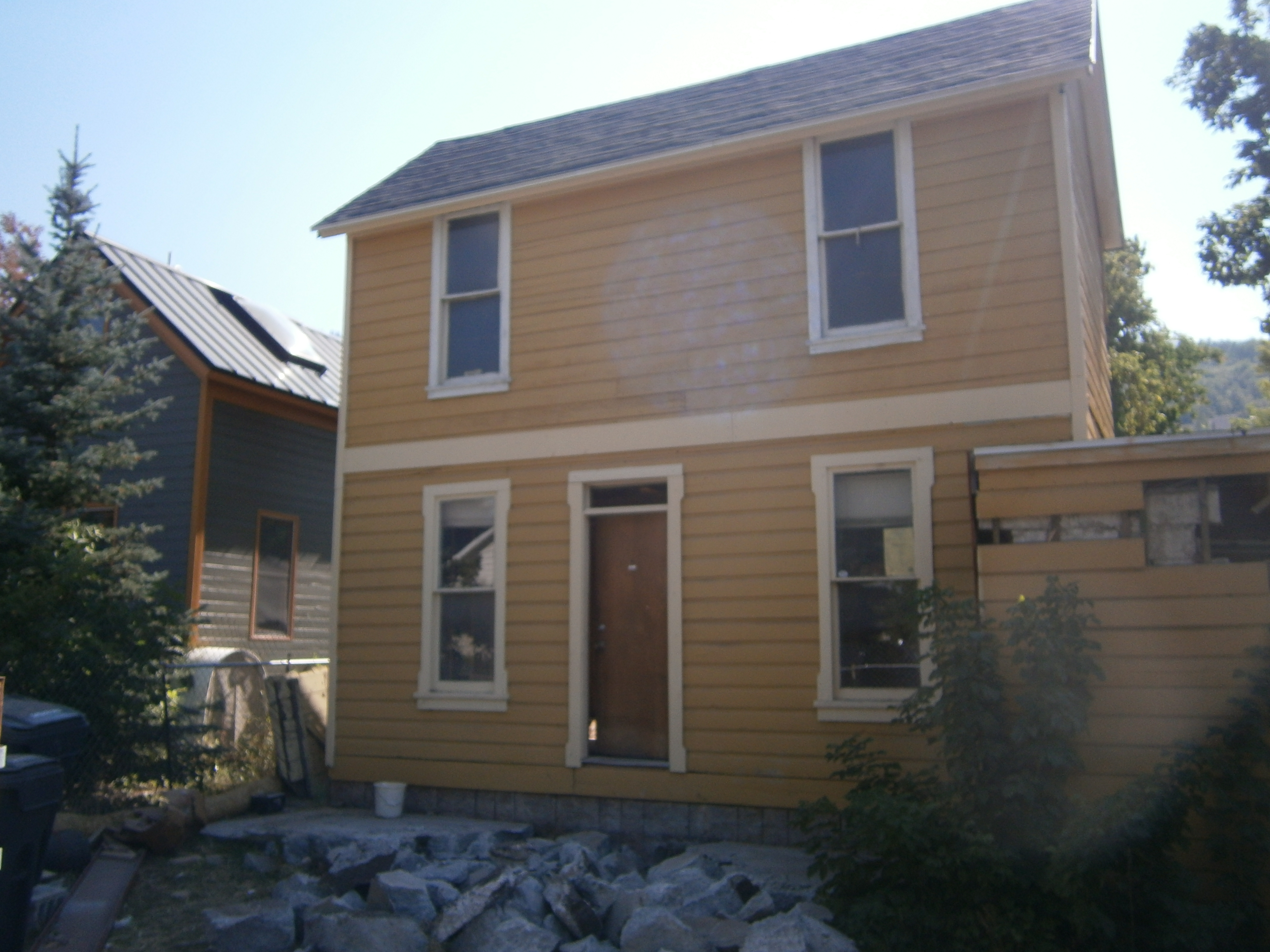

- Location within Utah Location within the United States
- Location: 1119 Park Ave., Park City, Utah
- Coordinates: 40°39′01″N 111°30′04″W
- Area: less than one acre
- Built: 1895
- MPS: Mining Boom Era Houses TR
- NRHP reference No.: 84002368
- Added to NRHP: July 12, 1984

The Samuel D. Walker House, at 1119 Park Ave. in Park City, Utah, was built around 1895. It was listed on the National Register of Historic Places in 1984.

It is a two-story frame hall and parlor plan house with a gable roof. It was built originally as a one-story hall and parlor plan house. Its first floor symmetric front has three bays: window, door, window.
