= Ellsworth J. Beggs House =

- U.S. National Register of Historic Places
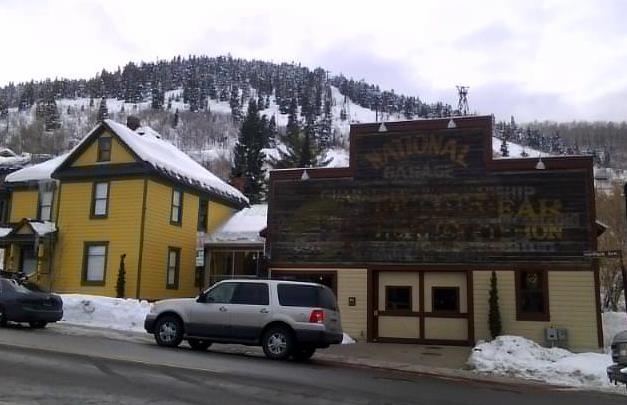

- Location within Utah Location within the United States
- Location: 703 Park Ave., Park City, Utah
- Coordinates: 40°38′48″N 111°29′52″W
- Area: 0.2 acres (0.081 ha)
- Built: c.1907
- Architectural style: Queen Anne, Eclectic
- MPS: Mining Boom Era Houses TR
- NRHP reference No.: 84002240
- Added to NRHP: July 11, 1984

The Ellsworth J. Beggs House, at 703 Park Ave. in Park City, Utah, was built or moved to the site around 1907. It was listed on the National Register of Historic Places in 1984.

It has also been known as High West Distillery.

It is Queen Anne and eclectic in style. It was deemed "architecturally significant as one of about four extant two story box houses in Park City, three of which are well preserved and included in this nomination. The two story box is closely tied with the pyramid house, one of three major house types in Park City. Like the pyramid house, it has a square or nearly square form, a pyramid or truncated hip roof, and a porch spanning the facade. It varies in size from the pyramid house, being a full two stories, as compared with the one or one and one half stories of the pyramid house. The two story box was not common in Park city, but judging from the range of extant buildings in Park City, it seems to have been the preferred design choice for a sizeable Park City house."
