= Otis L. Brown House =

- U.S. National Register of Historic Places
- Location within Utah Location within the United States
- Location: 713 Woodside Ave., Park City, Utah
- Coordinates: 40°38′47″N 111°29′54″W
- Area: 0.2 acres (0.081 ha)
- Built: c.1885
- MPS: Mining Boom Era Houses TR
- NRHP reference No.: 84002241
- Added to NRHP: July 11, 1984

The Otis L. Brown House, at 713 Woodside Ave. in Park City, Utah, was built around 1885. It was listed on the National Register of Historic Places in 1984.

It is a one-and-a-half-story hall and parlor plan house with a gable roof. It is two rooms deep and has been extended by additions within the historic period.

It was deemed "architecturally significant as one of 76 extant hall and parlor houses in Park City, 22 of which" were nominated for National Register listing at the same time. Hall and parlor houses were the "earliest house type to be built in Park City, and one of the three most common house types that were built during the early period of Park City's mining boom era."
