= Jack M. Murdock House =

- U.S. National Register of Historic Places
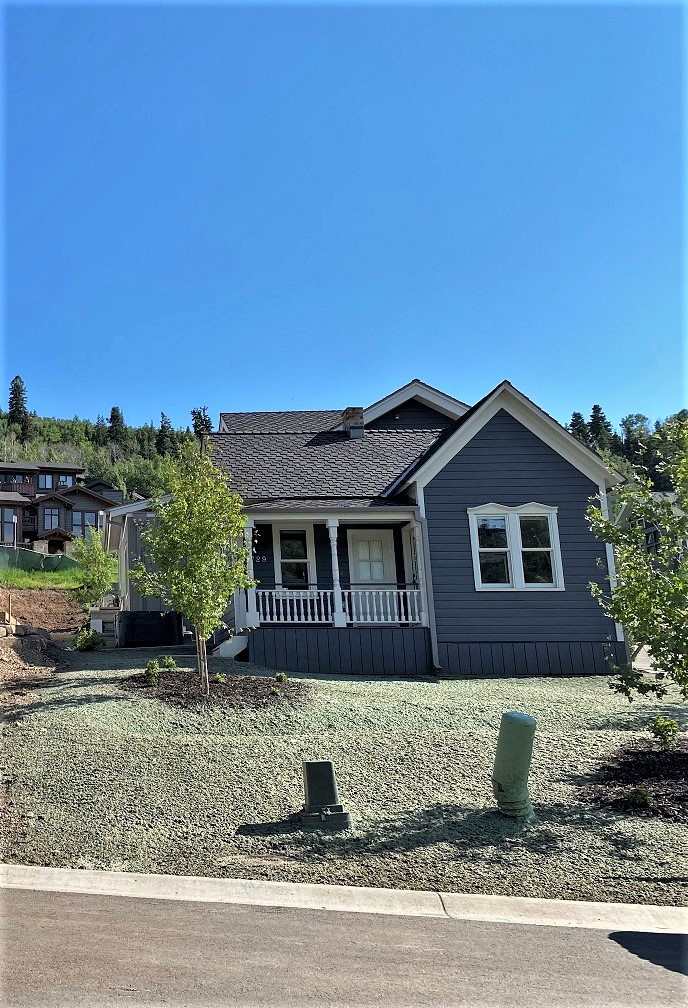
- Jack M. Murdock House in 2023

- Location within Utah Location within the United States
- Location: 652 Rossie Hill Dr. Park City, Utah
- Coordinates: 40.644582°N 111.488815°W
- Area: less than one acre
- Built: 1895
- MPS: Mining Boom Era Houses TR
- NRHP reference No.: 84002340
- Added to NRHP: July 12, 1984

The Jack M. Murdock House, at 652 Rossie Hill Dr. in Park City, Utah, was built around 1895. It was listed on the National Register of Historic Places in 1984.

It is a one-story "T/L cottage" with a gable roof. It has a hipped roof porch supported by lathe-turned piers.
