= Peter Farthelos House =

- U.S. National Register of Historic Places
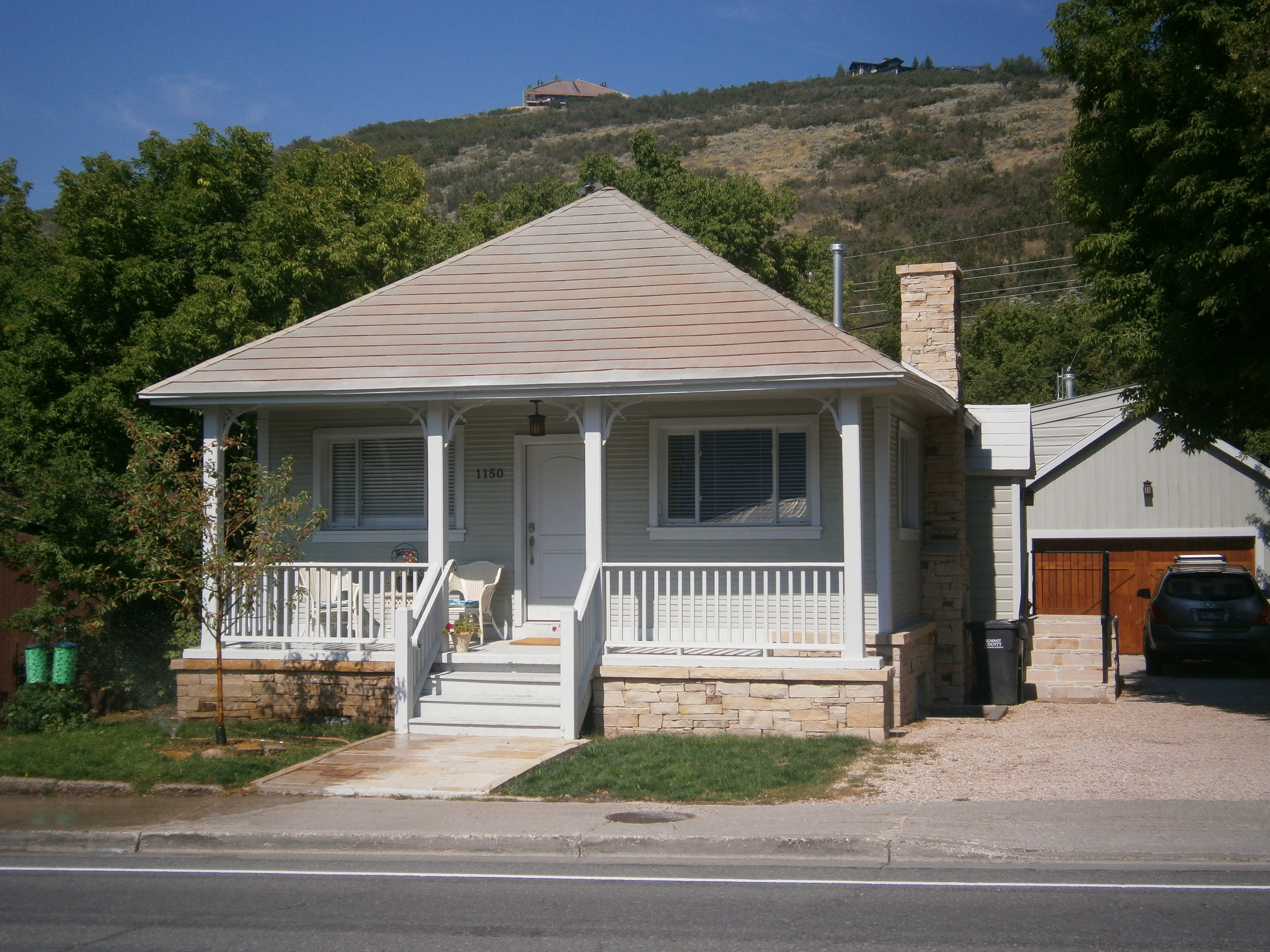

- Location within Utah Location within the United States
- Location: 1150 Park Ave., Park City, Utah
- Coordinates: 40°39′03″N 111°30′03″W
- Area: less than one acre
- Built: c.1921
- Built by: McDonald, Rod
- Architectural style: Bungalow
- MPS: Mining Boom Era Houses TR
- NRHP reference No.: 84002267
- Added to NRHP: July 12, 1984

The Peter Farthelos House, at 1150 Park Ave. in Park City, Utah, was built around 1921. It was listed on the National Register of Historic Places in 1984.

It was built by Rod McDonald, probably for Peter Farthelos, a partner in the Polychronis Grocery Store. He lived in the house until 1937. The house was moved in 1947 from its original location at the corner of Woodside Avenue and 7th Street.

It was deemed "architecturally significant as one of 18 extant bungalows in Park City, eight of which are included in this nomination. The bungalow is the major Park City house type that was built between 1907 and the end of the mining boom period, and significantly contributes to the character of the residential area. Although this house was moved in the 1950s from its original location a few blocks southwest of where it now sits, its current location provides a suitable and complementary setting, since it is still within the older residential area of the town which was also developed during the mining boom period."
