= House at 463 Park Ave. =

- U.S. National Register of Historic Places
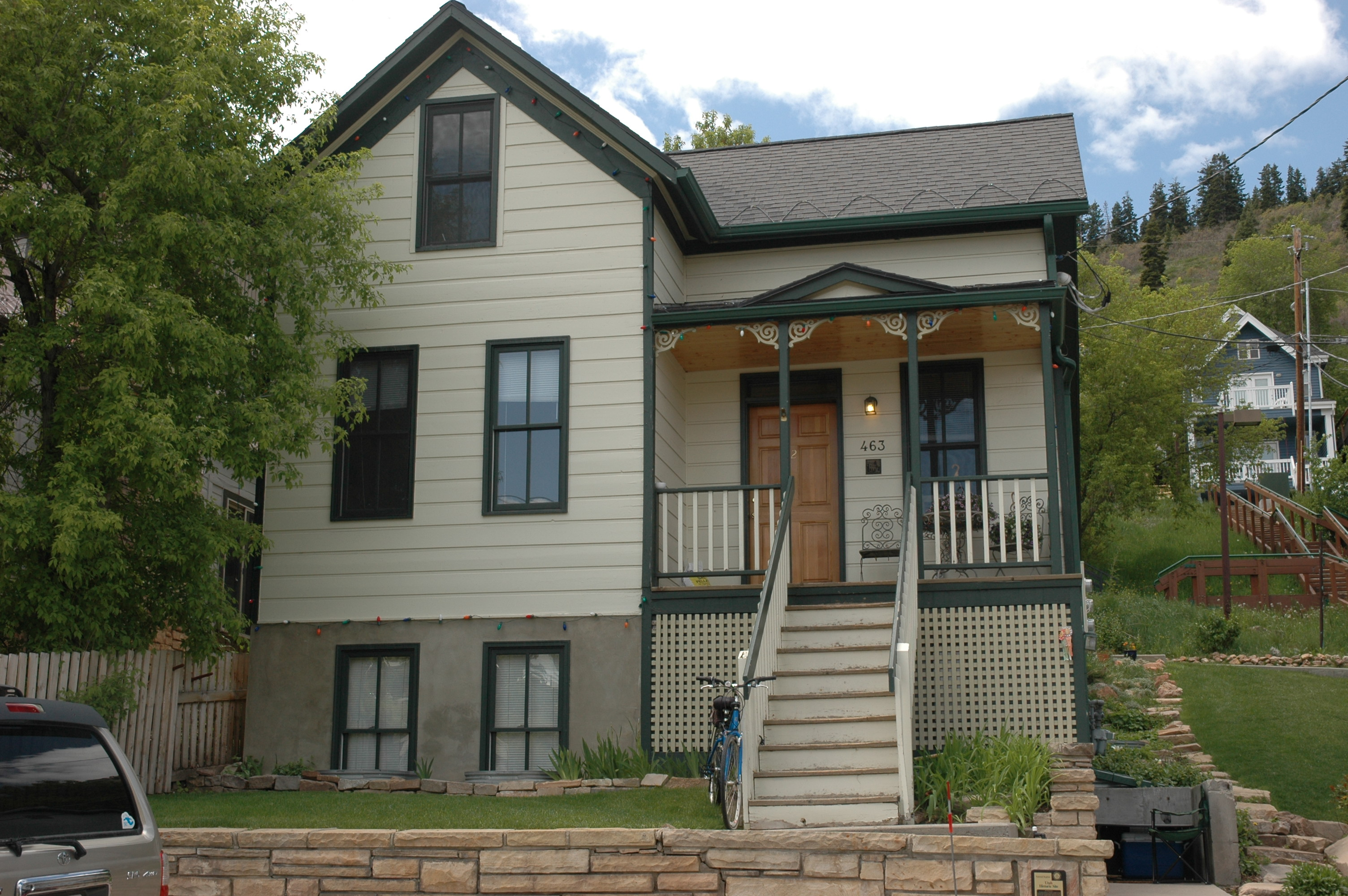
- Location: 463 Park Ave., Park City, Utah
- Coordinates: 40°38′34″N 111°29′45″W
- Area: .04 acres (0.016 ha)
- Built: c.1886
- MPS: Mining Boom Era Houses TR
- NRHP reference No.: 99000620
- Added to NRHP: May 28, 1999

The House at 463 Park Ave, at 463 Park Ave. in Park City, Utah, was built around 1886. It was listed on the National Register of Historic Places in 1999.

It is a one-and-a-half-story "wood-frame, cross-wing type house with gabled roofs on each wing. The East-facing, vernacular structure has some muted hints of Victorian Eclecticism in its detailing, typical of the Park City's building boom period." It was renovated in 1995. The property has terracing in its front yard, with stone retaining walls from the time of the original construction of the house.
