= House at 622 Rossie Hill Drive =

- U.S. National Register of Historic Places
- Location within Utah Location within the United States
- Location: 622 Rossie Hill Dr., Park City, Utah
- Coordinates: 40.644644°N 111.489056°W
- Area: 0.5 acres (0.20 ha)
- Built: 1895
- MPS: Mining Boom Era Houses TR
- NRHP reference No.: 84002308
- Added to NRHP: July 12, 1984

The House at 622 Rossie Hill Drive in Park City, Utah, presumably at 622 Rossie Hill Dr., was built around 1895. It was listed on the National Register of Historic Places in 1984.

It is a one-story frame "T/L cottage". It has a gable roof and it has shed additions attached to its south and east sides. A "simple porch spans the length of the stem-wing and wraps around the northwest corner of the building, terminating at an extension of the rear shed addition."
