= Dr. William Bardsley House =

- U.S. National Register of Historic Places
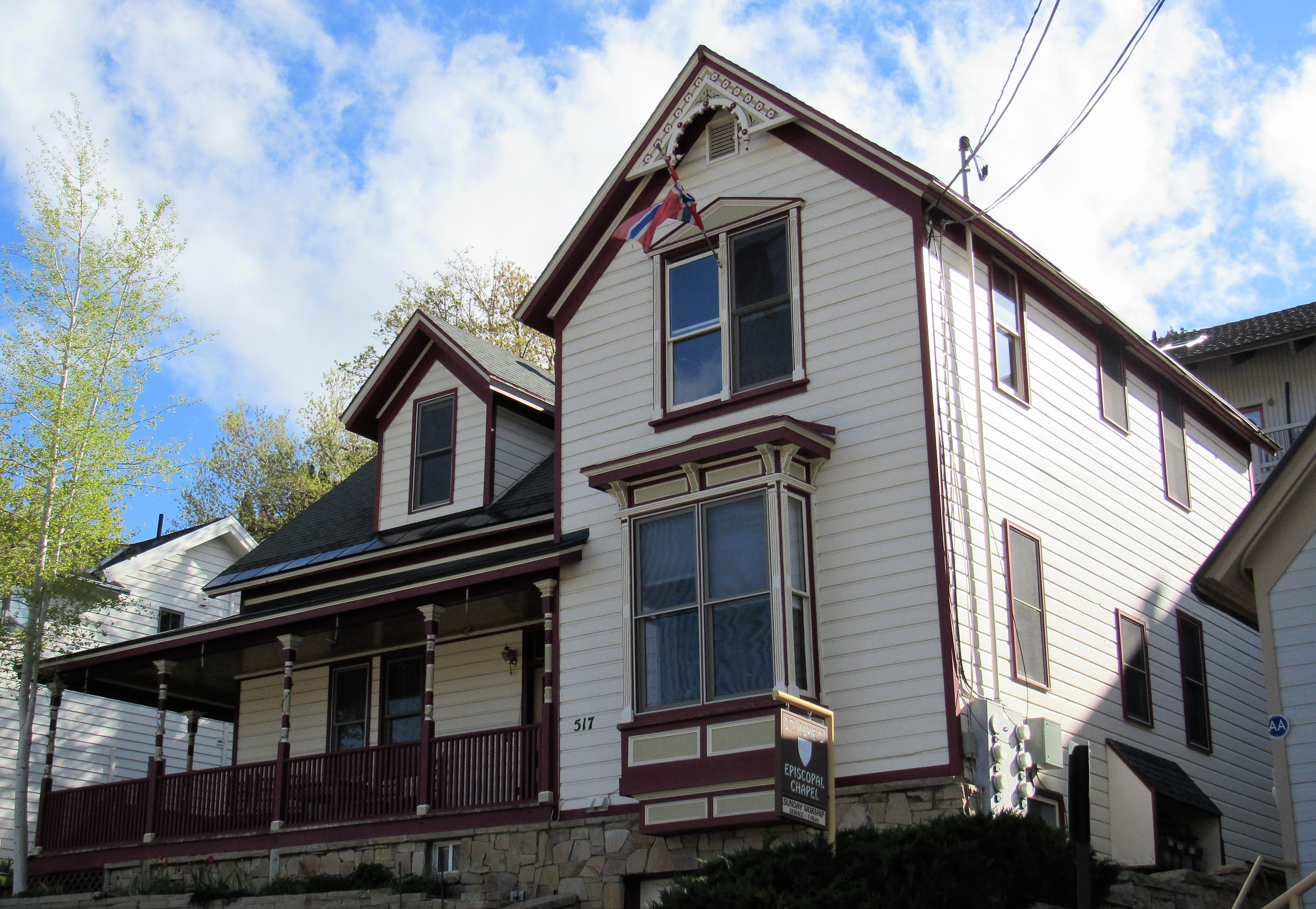

- Location within Utah Location within the United States
- Location: 517 Park Ave. Park City, Utah
- Coordinates: 40°38′39″N 111°29′47″W
- Area: 12 acres (4.9 ha)
- Built: c.1888
- Architectural style: Late Victorian
- MPS: Residences of Mining Boom Era Park City MPS
- NRHP reference No.: 94000531
- Added to NRHP: May 26, 1994

The Dr. William Bardsley House, at 517 Park Ave. in Park City, Utah, was built around 1888. It was listed on the National Register of Historic Places in 1994.

It is a frame cross-wing type house, with the cross-wing being two-story tall and projecting a gable-end towards the street. This has an "Italianate style box bay window and paired double hung windows above." The gable end has decorative bargeboard which was taken from another historic house, apparently replacing an earlier bargeboard. It is on the uphill side of Park Ave., overlooking Main St.

It was deemed significant as "an example of the residential architecture of Park City, the largest, historic metal mining town in Utah." It was "one of nearly 150 houses recorded as part of the research for the "Residences of Mining Boom Era Park City" thematic nomination" which determined National Register eligibility for 104 houses.
