= Eugene Streeter House =

- U.S. National Register of Historic Places
- Location within Utah Location within the United States
- Location: 335 Ontario Ave., Park City, Utah
- Coordinates: 40°38′35″N 111°29′33″W
- Area: less than one acre
- Built: c.1885
- MPS: Mining Boom Era Houses TR
- NRHP reference No.: 84002357
- Added to NRHP: July 12, 1984

The Eugene Streeter House, at 335 Ontario Ave. in Park City, Utah, was built around 1885. It was listed on the National Register of Historic Places in 1984.

It is a one-story frame "T/L cottage" with a gable roof, with a porch on the west side of the stem-wing. A rear shed extension was added before 1889.

It was vacant and in deteriorated condition in 1984, with no doors or windows.
