= Carl G. Johnson House =

- U.S. National Register of Historic Places
- Location within Utah Location within the United States
- Location: 147 Grant Ave., Park City, Utah
- Coordinates: 40.641029°N 111.493853°W
- Area: less than one acre
- Built: 1885
- MPS: Mining Boom Era Houses TR
- NRHP reference No.: 84002318
- Added to NRHP: April 12, 1984

The Carl G. Johnson House, at 147 Grant Ave. (or 147 Swede Alley) in Park City, Utah, was built around 1885. It was listed on the National Register of Historic Places in 1984.

It is a one-story frame hall and parlor plan house with a gable roof; it has a rear shed extension. Its facade is generally symmetrical, with the front door set just a bit off center between two windows. The door is distinctive, with "arch-topped panels. This type of door was common in Utah in the late 1800s, but few remain in Park City houses, and it is particularly unusual to find this type of door on so modest a dwelling."
