= House at 343 Park Avenue =

- U.S. National Register of Historic Places
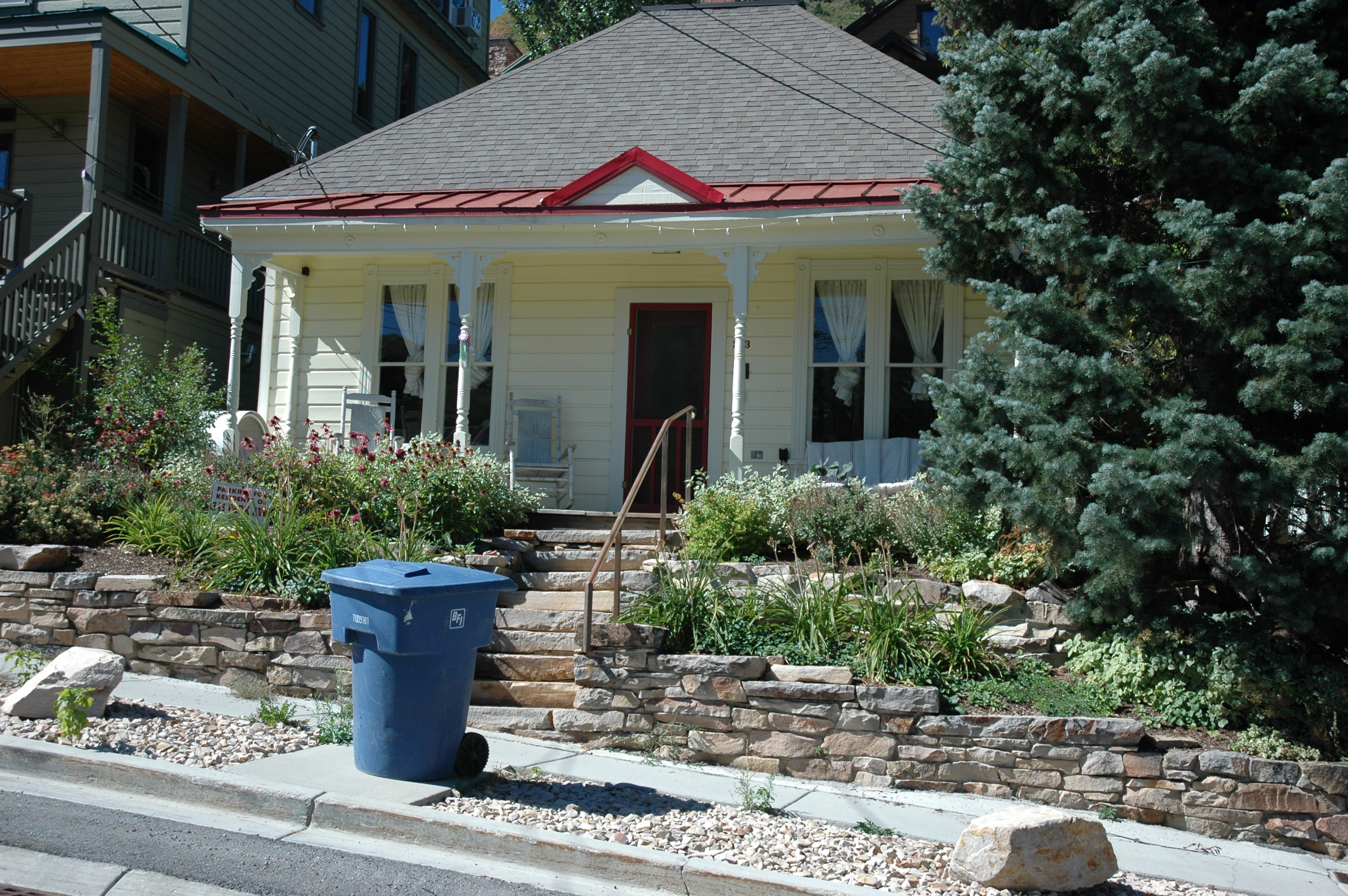

- Location within Utah Location within the United States
- Location: 343 Park Ave., Park City, Utah
- Coordinates: 40°38′33″N 111°29′43″W
- Area: less than one acre
- Built: 1898
- MPS: Mining Boom Era Houses TR
- NRHP reference No.: 84002297
- Added to NRHP: July 12, 1984

The House at 343 Park Avenue, at 343 Park Ave. in Park City, Utah, was built in 1898. It was listed on the National Register of Historic Places in 1984.

It is a one-story frame pyramid house with a truncated hip roof. It has a square plan and a "generally symmetrical facade with the door set slightly off center between pairs of double hung sash one over one light windows, the truncated hip roof, and the porch supported on lathe turned piers that spans the facade." Its windows have a common type of Victorian molding, with grooves and decorative corner blocks. A rear shed extension on the northwest corner of the building may have been part of the original construction, and even if it were added later it would contribute to the historic significance of the house as documenting "the most common and acceptable method of expansion of the small Park City house." As of 1984 the house had received "no major alterations and is in excellent condition. It maintains its original integrity."
