= Thomas C. Wilkinson House =

Historic house in Iowa, United States

- U.S. National Register of Historic Places
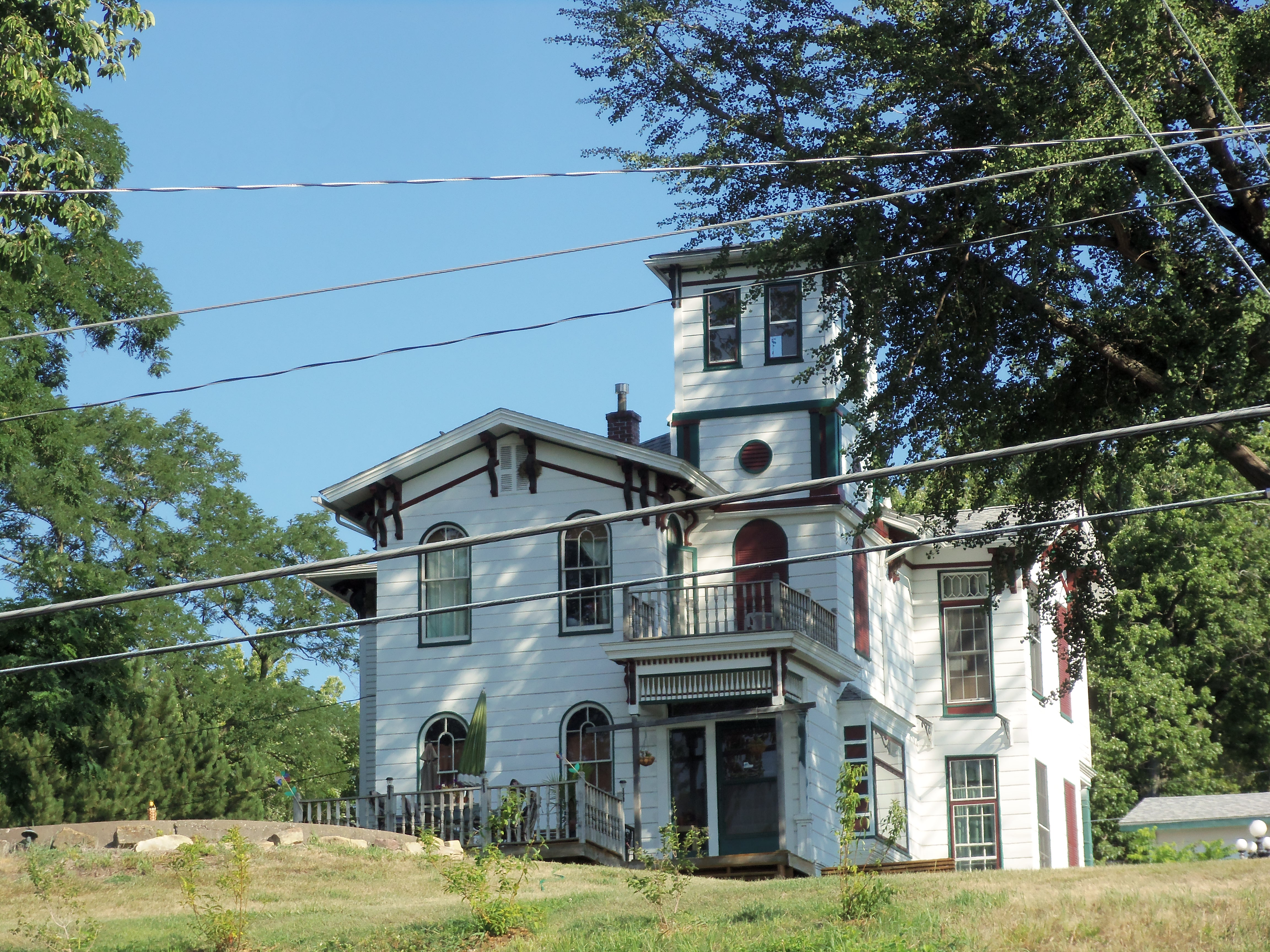

- Location within Iowa Location within the United States
- Location: 117 McManus St. Davenport, Iowa
- Coordinates: 41°31′14″N 90°37′11″W
- Area: 1 acre (0.40 ha)
- Built: 1860
- Architectural style: Italianate
- MPS: Davenport MRA
- NRHP reference No.: 84001592
- Added to NRHP: July 27, 1984

The Thomas C. Wilkinson House is a historic building located in the West End of Davenport, Iowa, United States. The residence has been listed on the National Register of Historic Places since 1984.

== History ==
This house was built for Thomas C. Wilkinson, who had been a bricklayer in St. Louis, Missouri. He retired to Davenport in 1854 and moved to Rose Hill Farm. He had this house built in 1860. His wife was Ellen McManus Atkinson whose father was Judge James McManus, and he lived on a farm just to the east. On Christmas Eve in 1876, Wilkinson committed suicide in the house.

== Architecture ==
The Thomas C. Wilkinson House is an Italian Villa style home that sits on a large lot high above street level. The two-story house is frame construction with a front gable, L-plan main block. It features a three-stage, square tower. The third level is not original to the house. The windows on the west wing appear to be from the turn of the 20th century and suggest this portion of the house was built later than the rest of the structure. The house features a bracketed cornice on the main block, an entrance porch with a spindle frieze and wrought iron railings. The main façade has two round-arched windows on both levels. The lower-level windows are taller than the upper-level windows and they all feature muntins. There are two circular windows above the ground level in the basement.
