= Park City Main Street Historic District =

Historic district in Park City, Utah, U.S.

- U.S. National Register of Historic Places
- U.S. Historic district
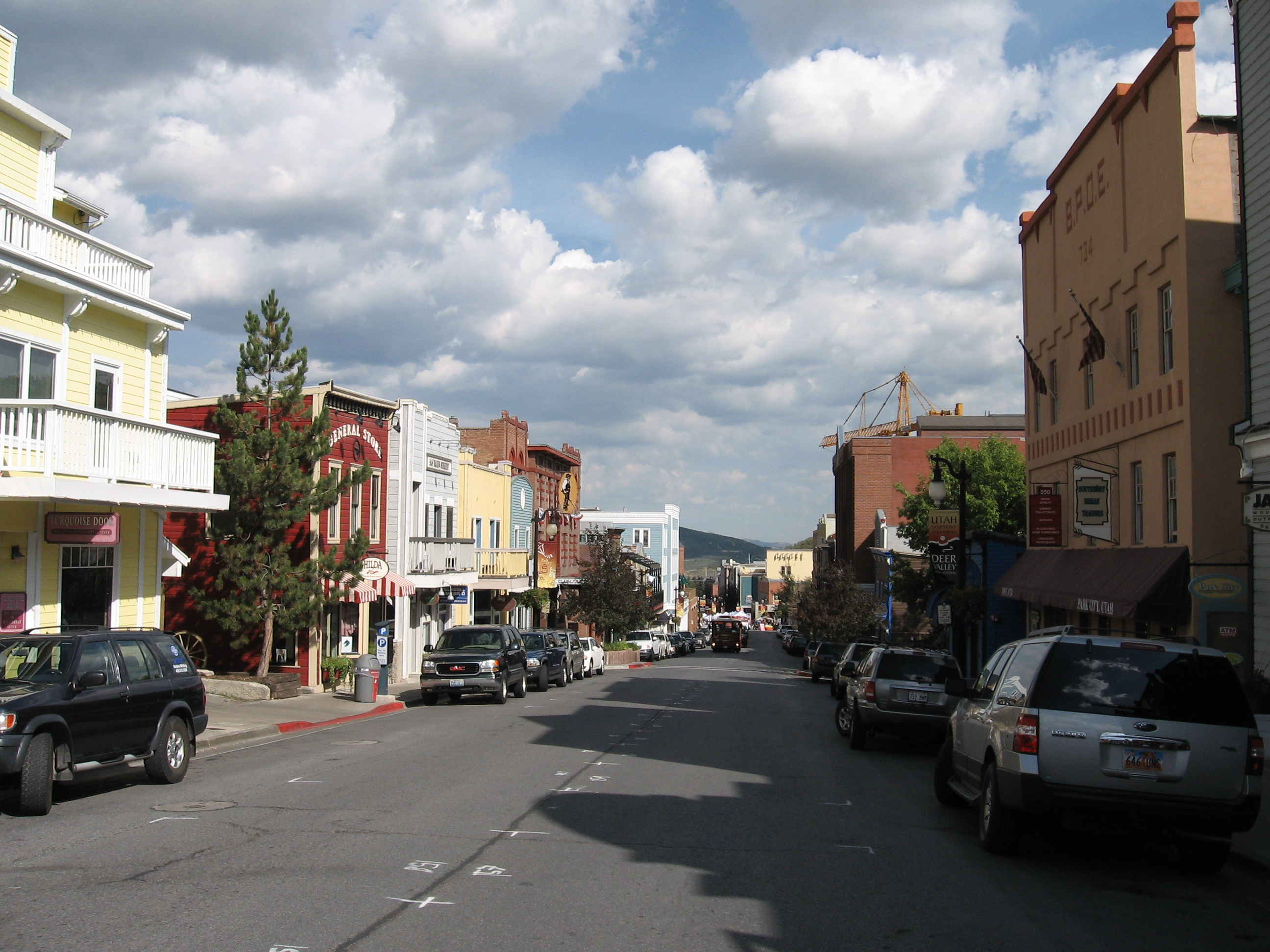
- Looking north-northwest along Main Street, August 2007

- Location within Utah Location within the United States
- Location: Main Street; Park City, Utah; United States
- Area: 13 acres (5.3 ha)
- Architect: Multiple
- Architectural style: Queen Anne, Mission/spanish Revival, Victorian
- NRHP reference No.: 79002511
- Added to NRHP: March 26, 1979

The Park City Main Street Historic District is a historic district in Park City, Utah, United States, that is listed on the National Register of Historic Places.

== Description ==
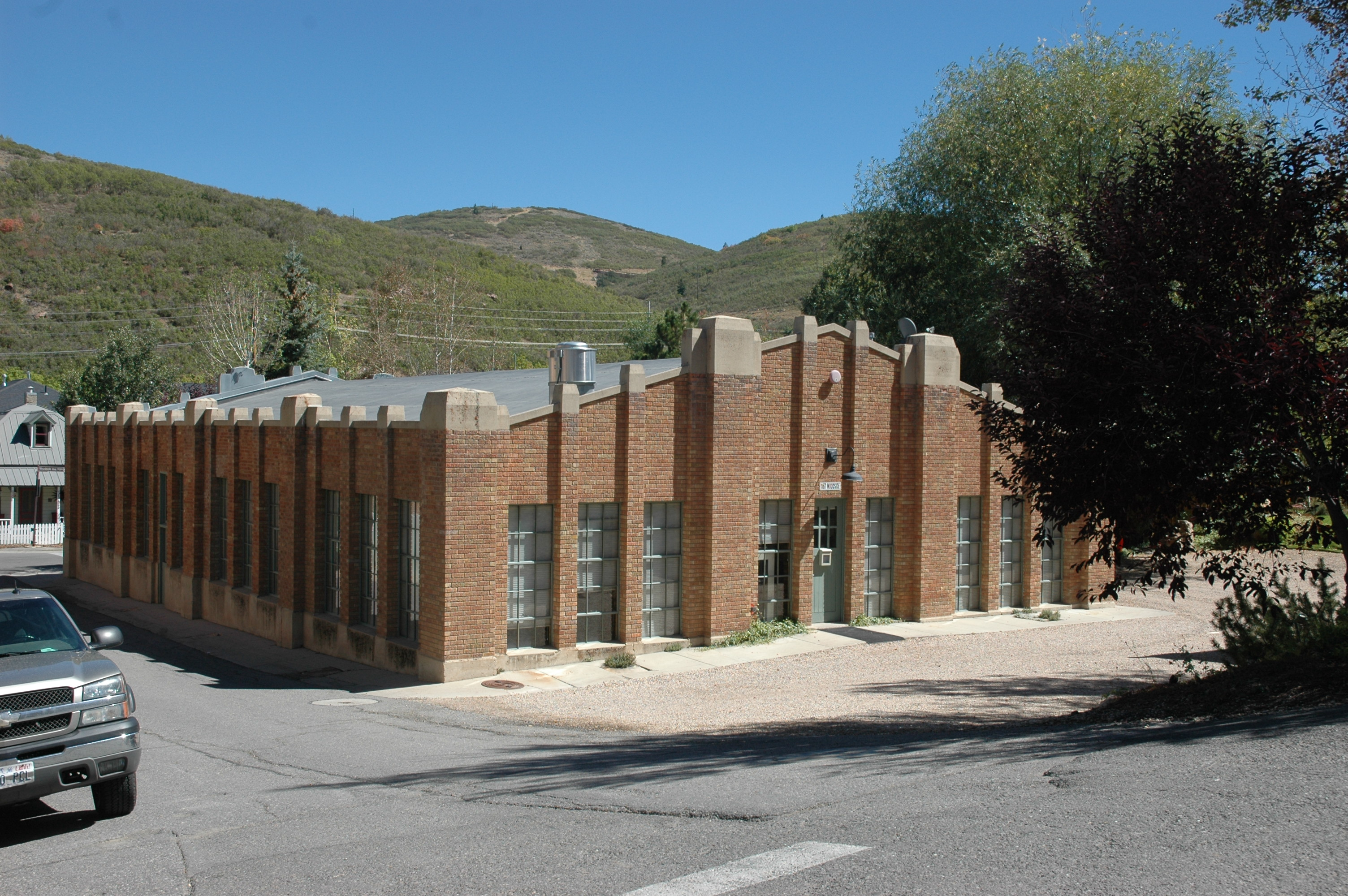
Park City High School Mechanical Arts building, September 2012

The district includes 47 contributing buildings on 13 acres (5.3 ha) along most of Park City's Main Street through its business section, plus part of Heber Avenue. All were built after the fire of June 19, 1898. The buildings include Queen Anne, Mission/Spanish Revival, and Victorian architecture. It was argued to be "the best remaining metal mining town business district in the state of Utah, exhibiting unique historical and architectural qualities."

The district was listed on the National Register of Historic Places March 26, 1979.

== See also ==
- National Register of Historic Places listings in Summit County, Utah
