= Jacob F. Richardson House =

- U.S. National Register of Historic Places
- Location within Utah Location within the United States
- Location: 205 Park Ave., Park City, Utah
- Coordinates: 40°38′28″N 111°29′40″W
- Area: 0.1 acres (0.040 ha)
- Built: c.1888
- MPS: Mining Boom Era Houses TR
- NRHP reference No.: 84002354
- Added to NRHP: July 12, 1984

The Jacob F. Richardson House, at 205 Park Ave. in Park City, Utah, was built around 1888. It was listed on the National Register of Historic Places in 1984.

It was a one-story frame "pyramid house" with a pyramidal hipped roof.

A 1995 survey from the Utah State Historic Preservation Office suggested the house was demolished.
