= House at 62 Daly Avenue =

- U.S. National Register of Historic Places
- Location within Utah Location within the United States
- Location: 62 Daly Ave., Park City, Utah
- Coordinates: 40°38′20″N 111°29′39″W
- Area: less than one acre
- Built: 1885
- MPS: Mining Boom Era Houses TR
- NRHP reference No.: 84002304
- Added to NRHP: July 12, 1984

The House at 62 Daly Avenue in Park City, Utah, presumably located at 62 Daly Ave., was built around 1885. It was listed on the National Register of Historic Places in 1984.

It is a frame "T/L cottage", which was expanded somewhat around 1889.

It may no longer exist.
