= Henry M. Hinsdill House =

- U.S. National Register of Historic Places
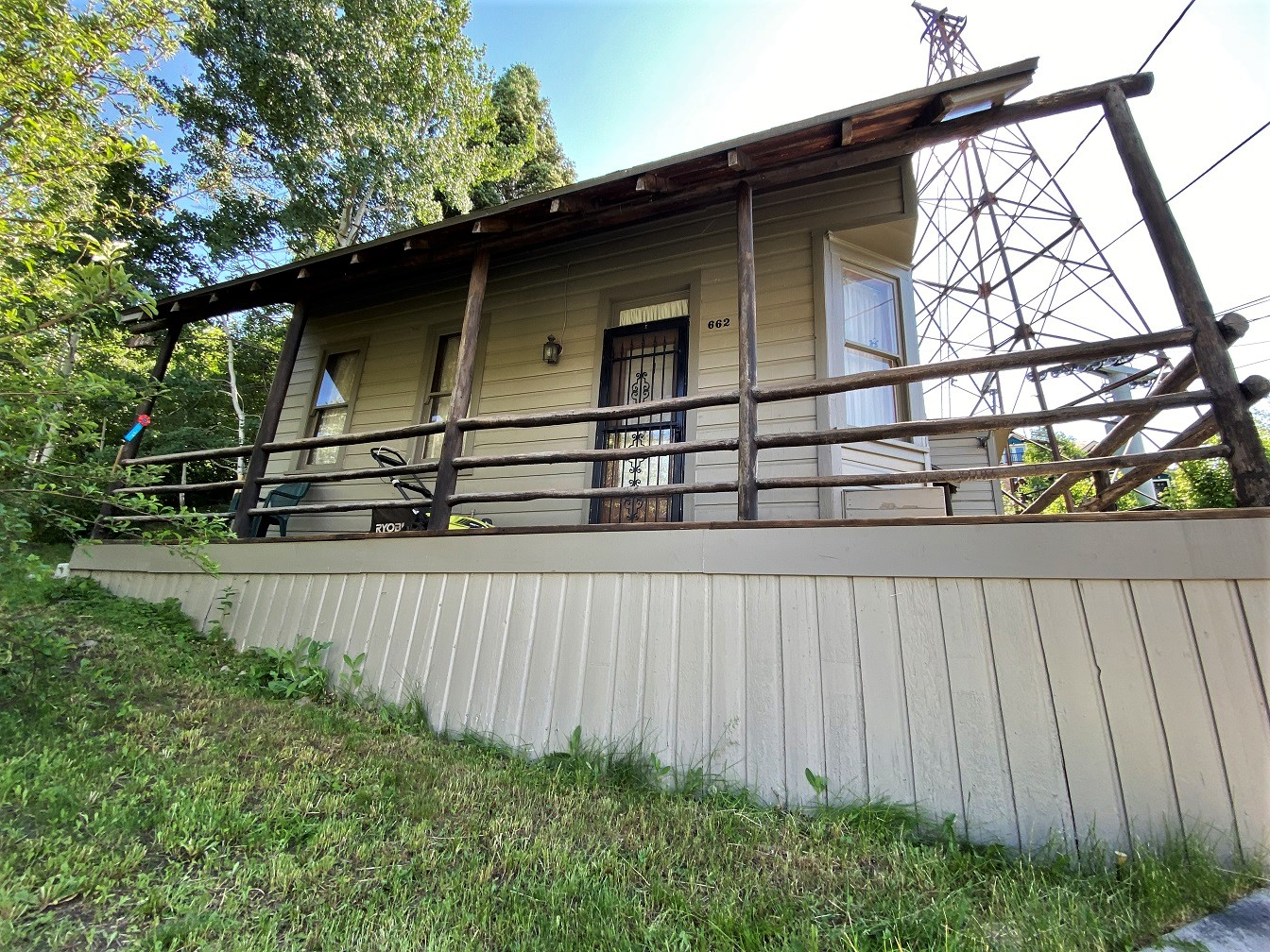
- Henry M. Hinsdill House in 2023

- Location within Utah Location within the United States
- Location: 662 Norfolk St. Park City, Utah
- Coordinates: 40°38′46″N 111°29′55″W
- Area: less than one acre
- Built: c.1893
- MPS: Mining Boom Era Houses TR
- NRHP reference No.: 84002283
- Added to NRHP: July 12, 1984

The Henry M. Hinsdill House, at 662 Norfolk St. in Park City, Utah, was probably built around 1893. It was listed on the National Register of Historic Places in 1984.

It is a one-story variant of a hall and parlor plan house, with a gable roof. Unlike the typically symmetric facade of a hall and parlor house, this has two windows on one side of the front door and one on the other, with the latter set at an angle in the northwest corner of the house. A porch across the front wraps around this corner. Original porch balustrade and piers have been replaced.

Norfolk Street is no longer open for automobile traffic along its full original length; south of 8th Street it becomes closed to traffic and appears to descend as a walkway on a diagonal down to Woodside Avenue, and then further down to Park Avenue. The Hinsdill House may be the house located at 40.646190°N 111.499316°W.
