= Charles Meadowcroft House =

Historic house in Park City, Utah, US

- U.S. National Register of Historic Places
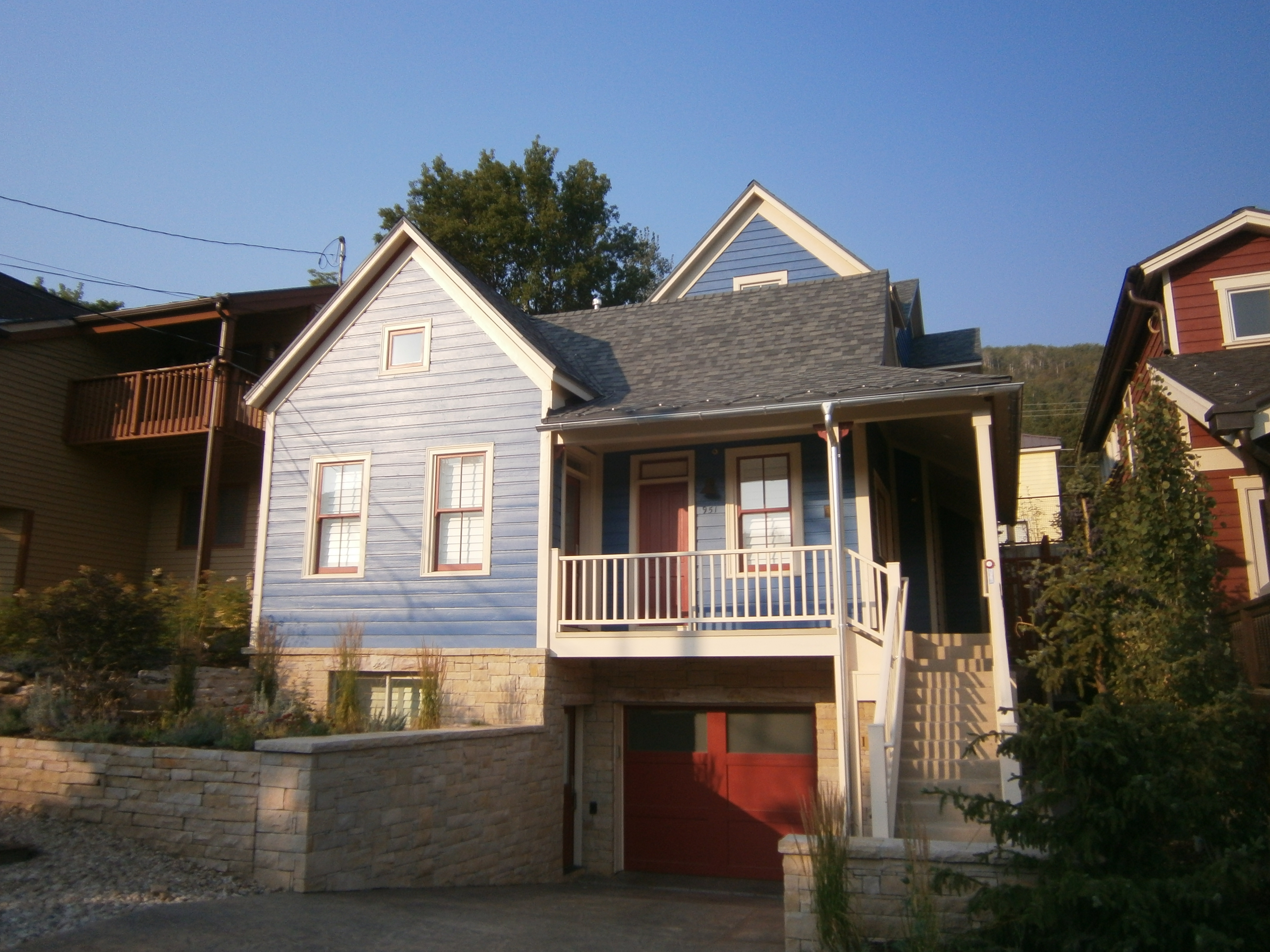

- Location within Utah Location within the United States
- Location: 951 Woodside Ave., Park City, Utah
- Coordinates: 40°38′55″N 111°30′00″W
- Area: less than one acre
- Built: c.1888
- MPS: Mining Boom Era Houses TR
- NRHP reference No.: 84002333
- Added to NRHP: July 12, 1984

The Charles Meadowcroft House, at 951 Woodside Ave. in Park City, Utah, was built in 1888. It was listed on the National Register of Historic Places in 1984.

It was probably owned by Charles Meadowcroft, who probably worked in mines here (as he did as well in Butte, Montana), and probably was built in 1888. It is a one-story frame "T/L cottage" with a gable roof. Its stem-wing's roof slopes off to the rear, as in a saltbox roof.
