= Reese Williams House =

- U.S. National Register of Historic Places
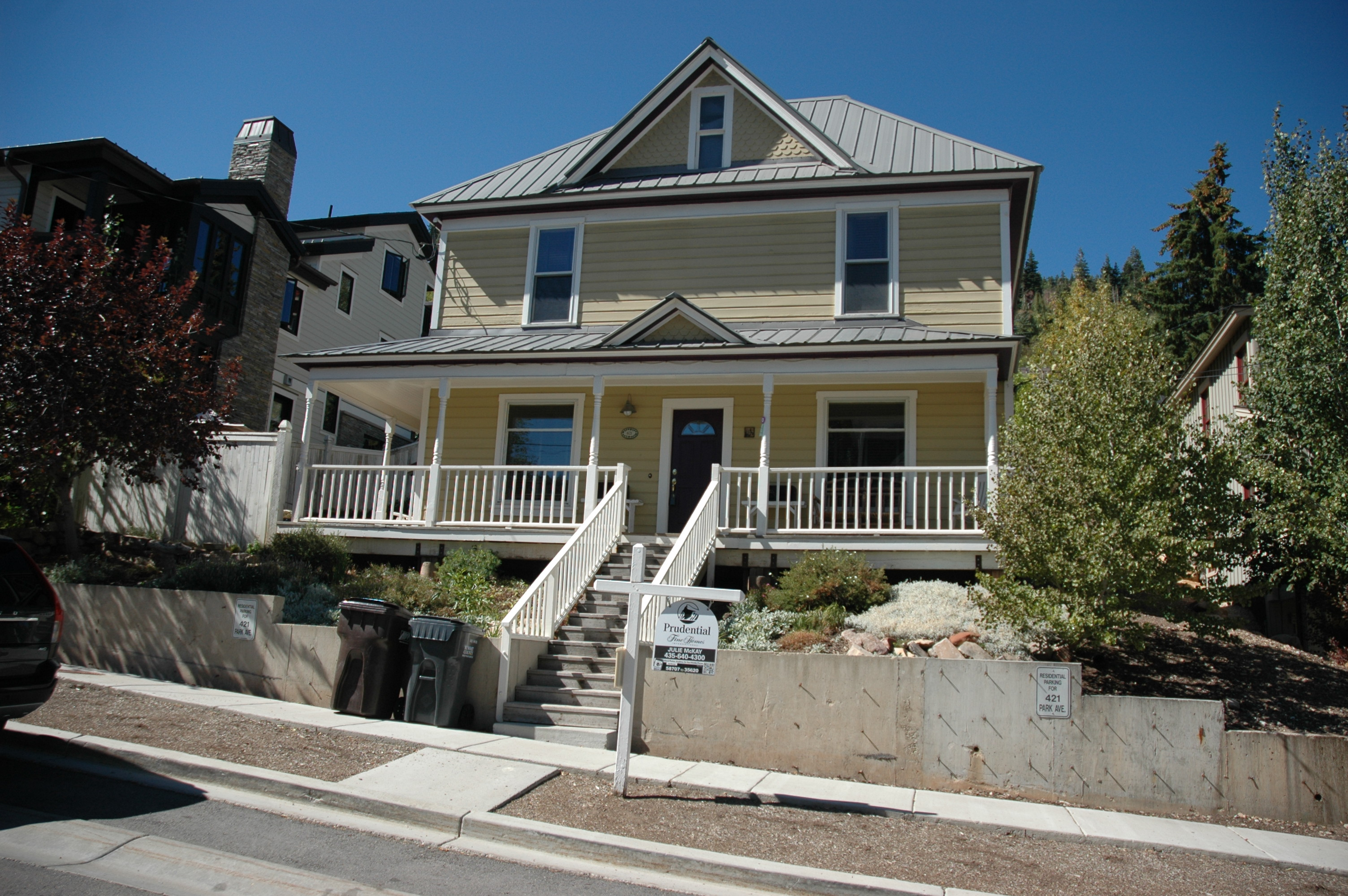

- Location within Utah Location within the United States
- Location: 421 Park Ave., Park City, Utah
- Coordinates: 40°38′36″N 111°29′45″W
- Area: less than one acre
- Built: 1898
- Built by: Beggs, Ellsworth J. Beggs
- MPS: Mining Boom Era Houses TR
- NRHP reference No.: 84002420
- Added to NRHP: July 12, 1984

The Reese Williams House, at 421 Park Ave. in Park City, Utah, was built in 1898. It was listed on the National Register of Historic Places in 1984.

It is a two-story frame "box house", with a truncated hip roof having dormers on east and south sides. It was built as a house for Reese Williams by carpenter Ellsworth J. Beggs. Williams, born in 1851 in Wales, worked at the Silver King Mine, and died in 1898 just three days after this house was completed; his widow and children lived here for only one year.

In 1984 it was deemed "architecturally significant as one of four extant two story box houses in Park City, three of which are well preserved and included in this nomination. The two story box is closely tied with the pyramid house, one of three major house types in Park City. Like the pyramid house, it has a square or nearly square form, a pyramid or truncated hip roof, and a porch spanning the facade. It varies in size from the pyramid house, being a full two stories, as compared with the one or one and one half stories of the pyramid house. The two story box was not common in Park city, but judging from the range of extant buildings in Park City, it seems to have been the preferred design choice for a sizeable Park City house. All of the extant examples of this house are located on prominent sites along Park Avenue, the most prestigious street in Park City, further documenting the significance of this house type as one chosen by those who were seeking more than a utilitarian dwelling. This house is also historically significant as the first hospital in Park City. It served the community from 1900 until at least 1904, when the large Miners Hospital was constructed."

It was leased in early 1900 to T.H. Monahan and E.H. Howard who set up the Park City Hospital. The hospital had an operating room and electric lights. Monahan was a surgeon; Howard was manager of the hospital. The Williams family continued to own the building after the hospital closed, eventually selling it in 1925 to Henry Thomas, and it was then owned by the Thomas family for many years.
