= Nicholas Rowe House =

- U.S. National Register of Historic Places
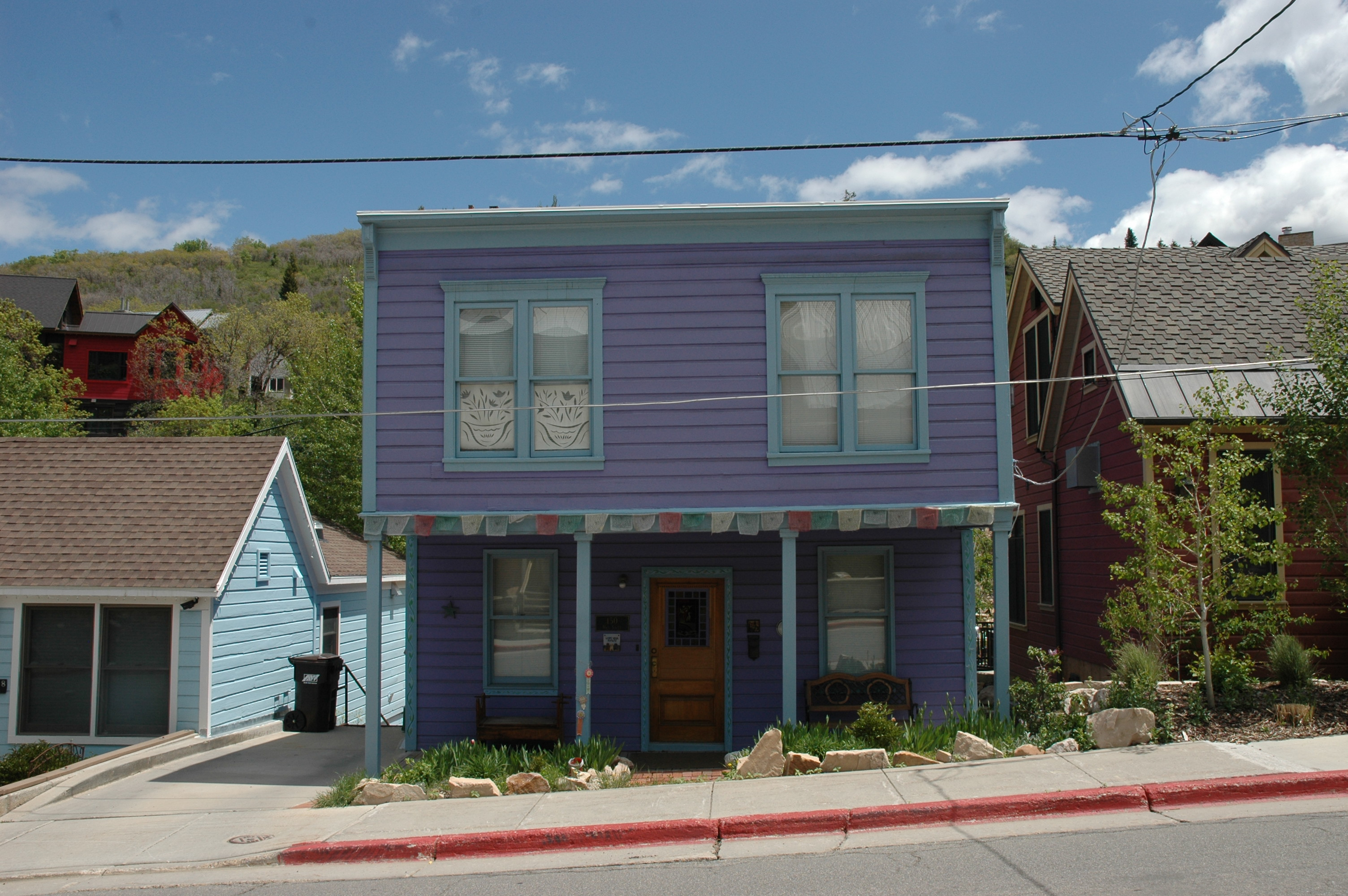

- Location within Utah Location within the United States
- Location: 150 Main St., Park City, Utah
- Coordinates: 40°38′26″N 111°29′36″W
- Area: less than one acre
- Built: 1885
- Architectural style: Hall & Parlor House
- MPS: Mining Boom Era Houses TR
- NRHP reference No.: 84000158
- Added to NRHP: October 22, 1984

The Nicholas Rowe House, at 150 Main St. in Park City, Utah, was built around 1885. It was listed on the National Register of Historic Places in 1984.

It was built as a hall and parlor plan house but later (probably between 1907 and 1910) was converted to a two-story commercial building, with the second floor projecting forward, supported by front porch pillars.

In 1984 it was deemed:

significant as one of three extant buildings in Park City which document the method of expanding a small mining town cottage by adding a full second story to an existing hall and parlor house. The addition of a shed extension to the rear of a house or a cross-wing to one end of a hall and parlor house were the preferred methods of expanding Park City's tiny houses. Because there are only three extant examples of houses that were expanded by the addition of a second story, it is likely that this type of expansion may have been more difficult to do, and therefore was less popular. All three houses were originally one story residences. Two of the three houses were changed to two story residences with gable roofs typical of hall and parlor houses. The flat roof of the addition on this house gives it the appearance of a commercial building. This is the only extant example in Park City of a building that was converted from a residence to a commercial building.

Its first known owner was Nicholas Rowe, who with his wife Carrie sold the house in 1909. Nicholas (Nick) Rowe was born in 1850 in England in 1850 and immigrated in 1869. In Park City, he worked as a miner. Carrie Rowe, born in England c.1866, immigrated in 1887. They married less than a year later.
