= Wilkinson-Hawkinson House =

- U.S. National Register of Historic Places
- Location within Utah Location within the United States
- Location: 39 Sampson Ave., Park City, Utah
- Coordinates: 40°38′24″N 111°29′43″W
- Area: less than one acre
- Built: c.1895-1910
- Architectural style: Bungalow/craftsman
- MPS: Mining Boom Era Houses TR
- NRHP reference No.: 84002418
- Added to NRHP: July 12, 1984

The Wilkinson-Hawkinson House, at 39 Sampson Ave. in Park City, Utah, was built probably sometime between 1895 and 1910. It was listed on the National Register of Historic Places in 1984.

It is a one-story frame house, somewhat of the pyramid house type but somewhat also a bungalow.

It was deemed "architecturally significant as one of only three well preserved examples of houses that are exceptions to the standard house types that were constructed during Park City's mining boom period. The majority of Park City houses were built as hall and parlor houses, T/L cottages, pyramid houses or variants of the pyramid house. Shotgun houses and bungalows occur in fewer numbers, but were also significant types. About 2Q% of the in-period extant buildings in Park City, including 39 Sampson, did not specifically fit into any one category or were altered so dramatically that the original type was not identifiable. Of those only three well preserved examples remain, all of which are included in this nomination. This house can be visually tied with the pyramid house and the bungalow. It has the square plan, the drop siding, and the indented porch of the pyramid house, but has the horizontal three part windows and simplified boxy form of the bungalow. In addition, it has a skewed gable roof which was not characteristic of either the pyramid house or the bungalow. This house is unlike any other house in Park City, and documents the fact that although standard house types were the rule in Park City, exceptions to the standard types were also built."

In 1898 Frank and Rosetta Hawkinson bought a house, probably this one, described as "'a 3 room frame house on Block 78 between the house of Alfred Lindorf on the West, J. Peterson on the East, and Philip Tobin on the South.'" Neighbors recall them living in this house for as long as they could remember. Frank, born in Sweden in 1869, immigrated to the U.S. as a boy with his parents, and worked 35 years for the Park Utah Mining Company. He died of a heart attack when repairing the roof of this house in 1939. Rosetta was born in Switzerland in 1877, and came to Midway, Utah with her parents at age 9. They had two children.
