= James Cavanaugh House =

- U.S. National Register of Historic Places
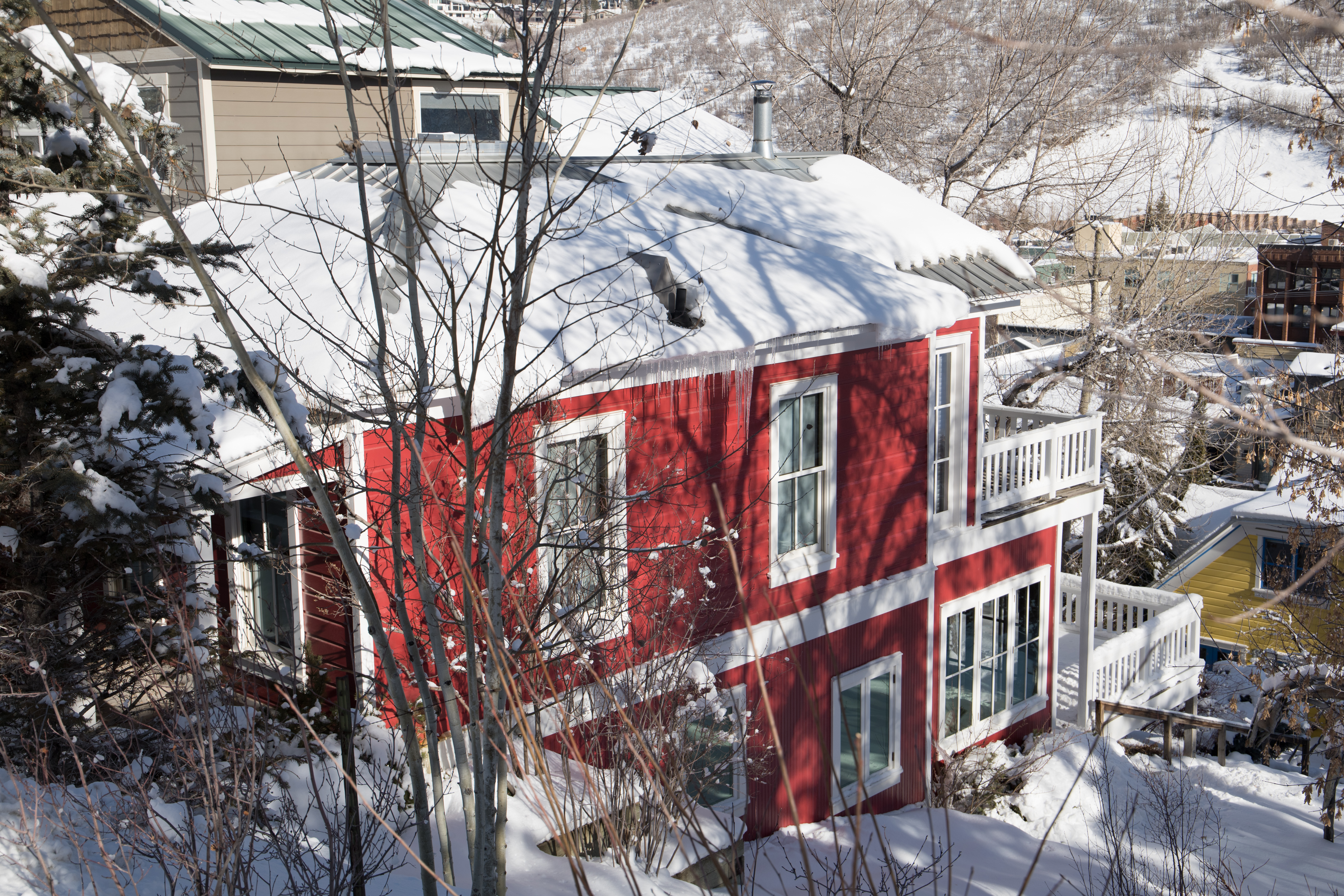

- Location within Utah Location within the United States
- Location: 564 Woodside Ave., Park City, Utah
- Coordinates: 40.644829°N 111.497875°W
- Area: less than one acre
- Built: 1891
- MPS: Mining Boom Era Houses TR
- NRHP reference No.: 84002246
- Added to NRHP: July 12, 1984

The James Cavanaugh House, at 564 Woodside Ave. in Park City, Utah, was built in 1891. It was listed on the National Register of Historic Places in 1984.

It is a one-story pyramid with a truncated pyramid roof. Its design is typical for pyramid houses with a square plan and its "door set slightly offcenter between two groups of windows."

The house, albeit perhaps remodeled and with a modern roof, appears to be still in place in 2019.
