= Archie Creek Camp =

- U.S. National Register of Historic Places
- Location: Western side of Archie Creek, Wasatch National Forest, Summit County, Utah, near Robertson, Wyoming
- Built: c.1890 to c.1930
- MPS: Tie Cutting lndustry of the North Slope of the Uinta Mountains, Utah (1867-1940s)
- NRHP reference No.: 15000958
- Added to NRHP: January 5, 2016

Archie Creek Camp, in Wasatch National Forest, in Summit County, Utah, was listed on the National Register of Historic Places in 2016. It is in the general area of Robertson, Wyoming.

It is the location of six log cabins or remnants thereof, built and used between 1890 and 1930. It was used by the Standard Timber Company during the 1910s through 1930s for producing railroad cross-ties.
