= Benedictus Carling House =

- U.S. National Register of Historic Places
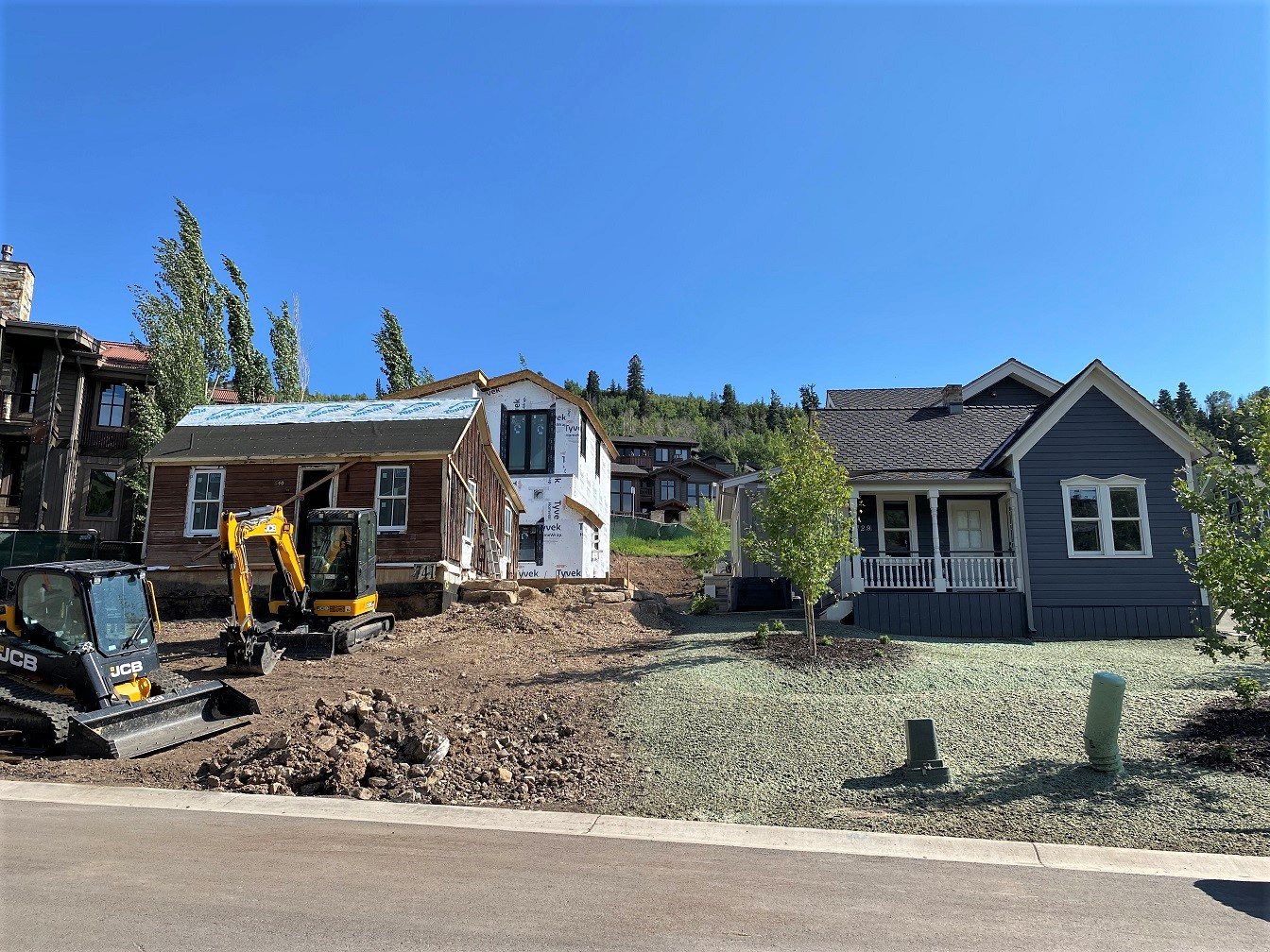
- Benedictus Carling House (left) in 2023

- Location within Utah Location within the United States
- Location: 660 Rossie Hill Dr. Park City, Utah
- Coordinates: 40°38′40″N 111°29′16″W
- Area: less than one acre
- Built: c.1890
- MPS: Mining Boom Era Houses TR
- NRHP reference No.: 84002244
- Added to NRHP: July 12, 1984

The Benedictus Carling House, at 660 Rossie Hill Dr. in Park City, Utah, is believed to have been built around 1890. Its first known owners were Benedictus and Maria Carling, who sold it in 1900. Benedictus was born in Sweden in 1854, immigrated in 1879, and worked in an ore processing mill in Park City.

It is a historic one-story hall and parlor plan house, one of 76 in Park City identified in a 1984 study. It was one of only three historic Park City houses with well-preserved board and batten siding. This siding was commonly used in mining town houses, but drop siding was generally used instead in Park City.

It was listed on the National Register of Historic Places in 1984.
