= Thomas and Jane Beech House =

- U.S. National Register of Historic Places
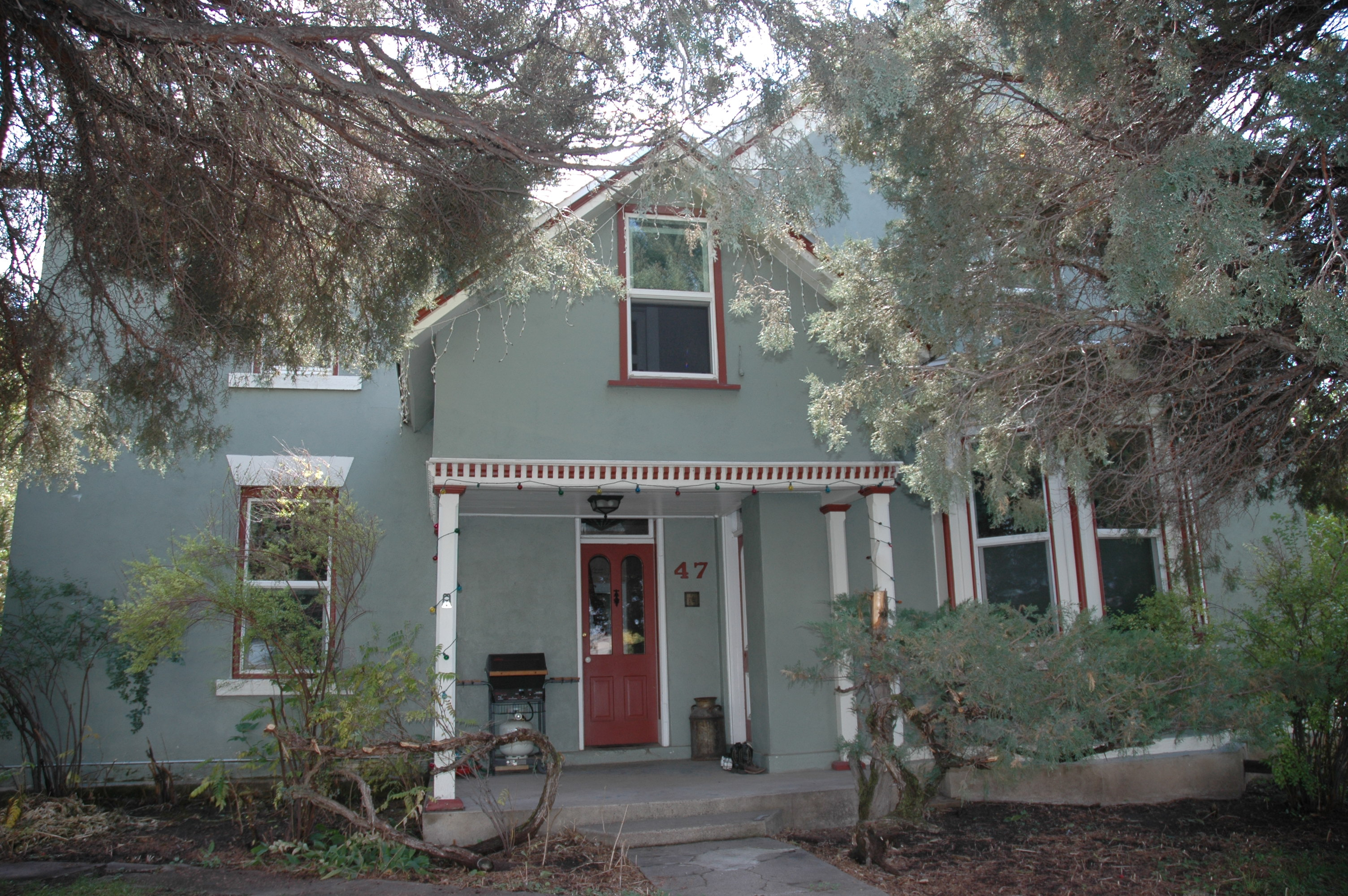

- Location within Utah Location within the United States
- Location: 47 West 50 South, Coalville, Utah
- Coordinates: 40°54′53″N 111°23′53″W
- Area: 0.3 acres (0.12 ha)
- Built: c.1900
- Built by: Allgood, John
- Architectural style: Late Victorian, Cross wing
- NRHP reference No.: 01000958
- Added to NRHP: September 7, 2001

The Thomas and Jane Beech House, at 47 West 50 South in Coalville, Utah, was built around 1900. It was listed on the National Register of Historic Places in 2001.

== Background ==
Its construction was managed by Jane Allgood Beech with assistance of her brother John Allgood. Jane, born May 5, 1849, at Coleorton in Leics, England, immigrated in 1864 to Utah with her widowed mother and brothers. She married Thomas Beech in 1868.

== Appearance ==
The house is a brick, two-story, Victorian-Eclectic-style house with a cross wing plan. Its two-story cross wing was built around 1900; the smaller one-story gable-roof wing projecting to the rear was a house built by 1891 and perhaps as early as the 1870s or 1880s. "Though a substantial home for the small rural town, the home has few decorative elements compared with the other cross wings in town, and is the latest two-story example in Coalville."

It was built of light red brick on a limestone foundation. The exterior was stuccoed in the early 1940s. The house has a stucco-covered brick ell to the rear which was a detached building, and has a porch addition.
