= House at 555 Deer Valley Road =

- U.S. National Register of Historic Places
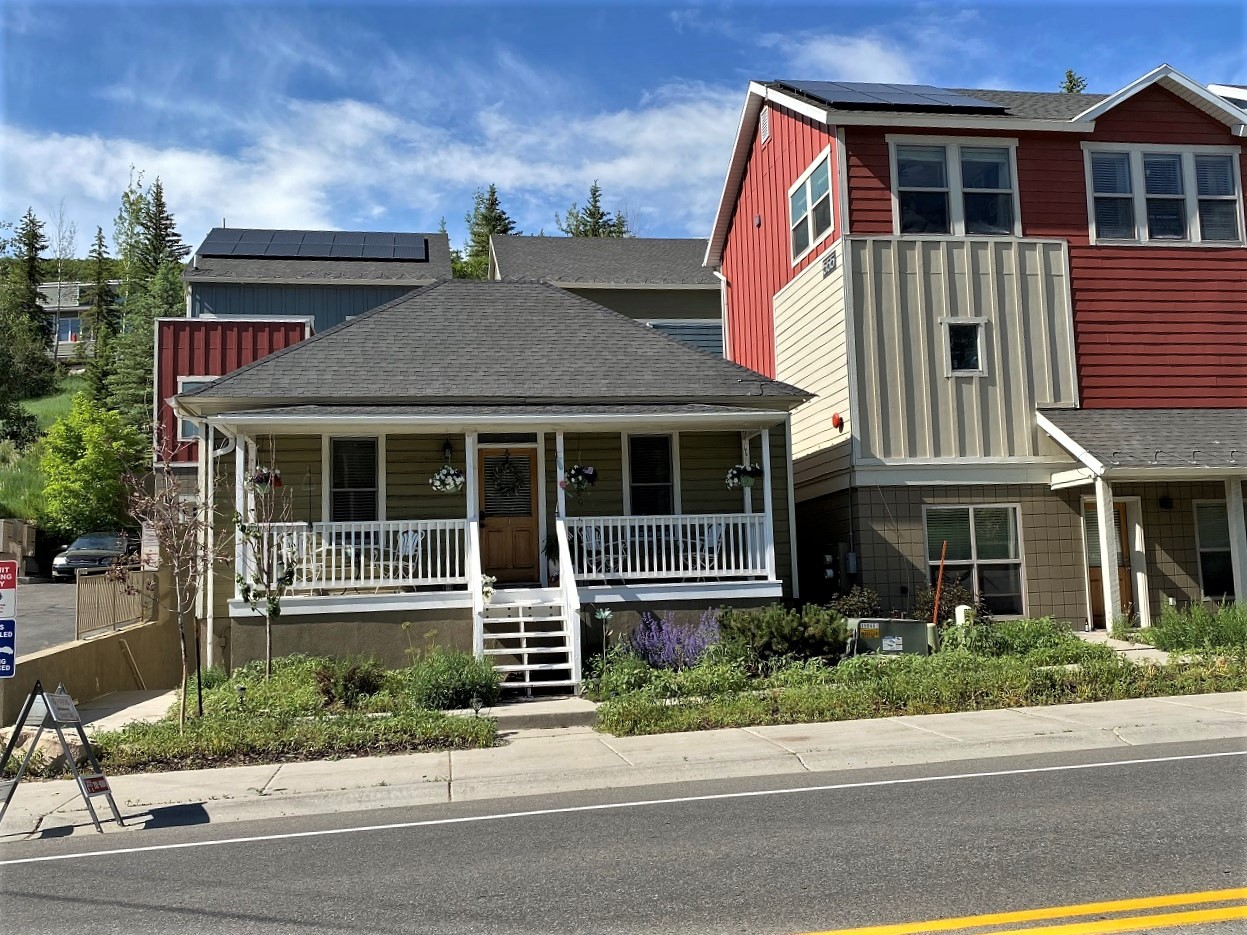
- The houses in 2023

- Location within Utah Location within the United States
- Location: 555 Deer Valley Rd. Park City, Utah
- Coordinates: 40.645366°N 111.490975°W
- Area: 0.3 acres (0.12 ha)
- Built: c.1895
- MPS: Mining Boom Era Houses TR
- NRHP reference No.: 84002299
- Added to NRHP: July 12, 1984

The House at 555 Deer Valley Road, at 555 Deer Valley Rd. in Park City, Utah, was built in 1895. It was listed on the National Register of Historic Places in 1984.

It is a one-story frame pyramid house, one of 28 nominated for National Register listing in 1984. About this one: "Unlike a majority of Park City's pyramid houses which have truncated hip or clipped gable roofs, this house has a true pyramid roof. It is an archetypal example of the pyramid house, one of the simplest, most clearly stated examples of the pyramid house type in Park City. Its square plan, pyramid roof, and symmetrical facade with a hip roof porch spanning the width of it are the principle elements of the type. There is a second door on the west side of the building over which a simple porch was added. There is a rear shed extension attached to the north side which projects past the west side of the building. In Park City houses the projection of a rear shed extension was often made to provide space for a wood or coal shed. In-period rear extensions are part of Park City's architectural vocabulary. Although in many cases an extension represents a major alteration of the original house, it usually contributes to the significance of a house because it documents the most common and acceptable method of expansion of the small Park City house. The windows on the south and east sides of the house are the one over one double hung sash type." In 1984 the house was in good condition and its original integrity had so far been preserved.

In 2019, the house appears to have been renovated since 1984 and looks, from the street, to be still in good condition.
