= Alfred Lindorff House =

- U.S. National Register of Historic Places
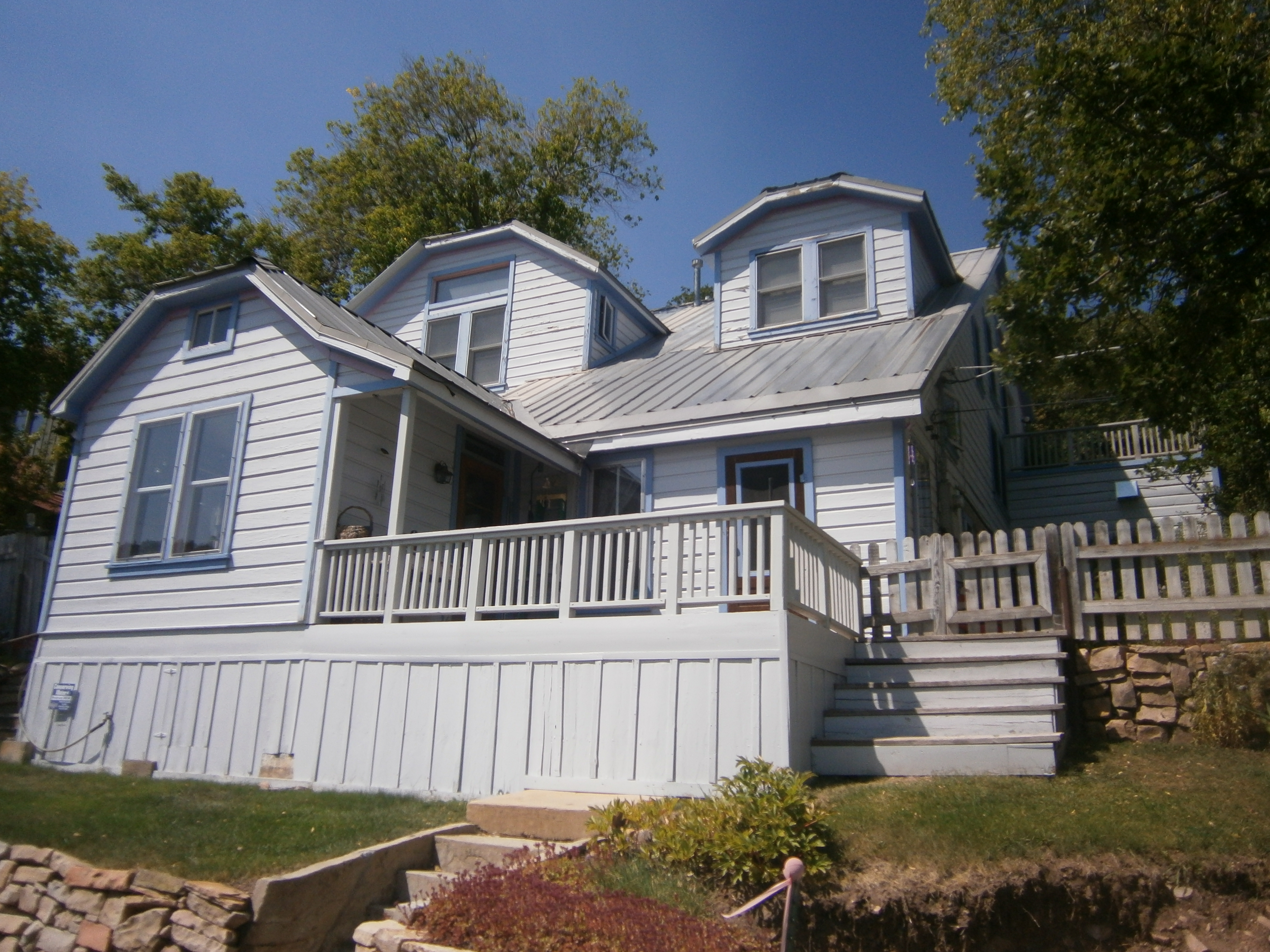

- Location within Utah
- Location: 40 Sampson Ave., Park City, Utah
- Coordinates: 40°38′25″N 111°29′45″W
- Area: less than one acre
- Built: c.1885
- MPS: Mining Boom Era Houses TR
- NRHP reference No.: 84002331
- Added to NRHP: July 12, 1984

The Alfred Lindorff House, at 40 Sampson Ave. in Park City, Utah, was built around 1885. It was listed on the National Register of Historic Places in 1984.

It was deemed "architecturally significant as one of two well preserved examples of a Park City house with a distinct L-plan by addition. This type of addition does not appear to have been common in Park City building, and less than five examples of the type are extant. As opposed to the T/L cottage and the T/L cottage by addition, which viewed from the facade have relatively short cross-wings and longer stem-wings, the L-plan by addition house has a distinctive L-plan consisting of two wings of almost equal length that intersect at right angles. A difference in the window types of the two wings indicates that this house was not built with an original L-plan, but instead is the result of the expansion of a small house by the addition of a cross-wing to the front of one end of the original facade. Although an uncommon type, the L-plan by addition is significant because it is a variant of the common modification of adding a cross-wing to an existing house as a solution to the problem of inadequate space in the tiny mining town cottage."

It was probably the home of Alfred Lindorff, who was born in Denmark in 1863 and immigrated with his wife Mary in 1890.
