= National Register of Historic Places listings in Sanpete County, Utah =

Location of Sanpete County in Utah

This is a list of the National Register of Historic Places listings in Sanpete County, Utah.

This is intended to be a complete list of the properties and districts on the National Register of Historic Places in Sanpete County, Utah, United States. Latitude and longitude coordinates are provided for many National Register properties and districts; these locations may be seen together in a map.

Sanpete County and Sevier County make up the "Little Scandinavia" portion of Utah, where many of Utah's 20,000 19th-century Scandinavian immigrants settled. Pair-houses, a Scandinavian home form, are relatively common.

There are 84 properties and districts listed on the National Register in the county. One other site in the county was once listed, but has since been removed.

This National Park Service list is complete through NPS recent listings posted July 31, 2026.

== Current listings ==
	Name on the Register	Image	Date listed	Location	City or town	Description
1	Claus P. Andersen House	Claus P. Andersen House	February 1, 1983 (#83003183)	202 S. 200 East; 39°21′22″N 111°34′56″W	Ephraim	Adobe Scandinavian-style pair-house, one of oldest structures in Ephraim.
2	Lars S. Andersen House	Lars S. Andersen House	February 1, 1983 (#83003184)	213 N. 200 East; 39°21′50″N 111°34′56″W	Ephraim	Pair house with additions.
3	James Anderson House	James Anderson House	October 3, 1980 (#80003945)	15 S. 200 East; 39°37′40″N 111°26′03″W	Fairview	
4	Lewis and Clara Anderson House	Lewis and Clara Anderson House	January 12, 1998 (#97001629)	542 S. Main St. 39°15′27″N 111°38′15″W	Manti	Two-story brick Queen Anne.
5	Niels Ole Anderson House	Niels Ole Anderson House	October 5, 1978 (#78002687)	308 S. 100 East; 39°21′15″N 111°35′04″W	Ephraim	Built in 1868 with Greek Revival and Federal stylings.
6	Ole Arilsen House	Ole Arilsen House	October 3, 1980 (#80003953)	89 N. 300 East; 39°32′52″N 111°27′00″W	Mount Pleasant	Folk vernacular house of "2/3 central passageway plan" type, "with excellent brickwork".
7	Andrew Barentsen House		February 1, 1983 (#83003185)	195 W. 200 South; 39°37′28″N 111°38′22″W	Fountain Green	Three-room pair house, possibly demolished sometime between 2007 & 2018.
8	Anthony W. Bessey House	Anthony W. Bessey House	October 22, 1980 (#80003947)	415 N. 300 West; 39°16′18″N 111°38′34″W	Manti	Small stone house built around 1860, one of first outside Manti's forts.
9	Billings-Hougaard House		October 14, 1980 (#80003948)	75 E. 300 North; 39°16′12″N 111°38′07″W	Manti	One of best surviving unsheathed adobe brick homes in Utah.
10	W.D. Candland House	W.D. Candland House	September 30, 2019 (#100004482)	123 N. 100 West; 39°32′55″N 111°27′28″W	Mount Pleasant	Two-story brick Victorian Eclectic house built in 1904.
11	Casino Theatre	Casino Theatre	September 22, 1989 (#89001416)	78 S. Main St. 39°09′15″N 111°49′04″W	Gunnison	
12	Centerfield School and Meetinghouse	Centerfield School and Meetinghouse	September 12, 2000 (#00001068)	140 S. Main St. 39°07′25″N 111°49′11″W	Centerfield	Stone school and church from c. 1886-67.
13	Cox Family Big House Complex		April 7, 2020 (#100005176)	98 N. 100 West; 39°16′02″N 111°38′20″W	Manti	
14	Cox-Shoemaker-Parry House	Cox-Shoemaker-Parry House	August 4, 1982 (#82004157)	50 N. 100 West; 39°15′59″N 111°38′19″W	Manti	Limestone house built in 1858 by Cox, where he lived with his three wives. Expanded by Parry in 1880.
15	Charles Crawforth Farmstead	Charles Crawforth Farmstead	February 19, 1980 (#80003956)	Southwest of Spring City, approximately 6700 Crawford Rd. 39°27′16″N 111°30′45″W	Spring City	1884 stone house and outbuildings, relatively isolated
16	John Dorius Jr. House	John Dorius Jr. House	May 9, 1985 (#85000964)	46 W. 100 North; 39°21′43″N 111°35′18″W	Ephraim	Brick Queen Anne house from 1897.
17	Ephraim Carnegie Library	Ephraim Carnegie Library	October 25, 1984 (#84000149)	30 S. Main St. 39°22′05″N 111°35′12″W	Ephraim	
18	Ephraim Relief Society Granary	Ephraim Relief Society Granary	September 30, 2019 (#100004481)	86 N. Main St. 39°21′40″N 111°35′12″W	Ephraim	Two-story stone granary building right on Main St., recently home of "Granary Arts"
19	Ephraim Tithing Office—Bishop's Storehouse		October 30, 2020 (#85003671)	64 N. Main; 39°21′31″N 111°35′14″W	Ephraim	
20	Ephraim United Order Cooperative Building	Ephraim United Order Cooperative Building	March 20, 1973 (#73001862)	Main and 1st North Sts. 39°21′41″N 111°35′09″W	Ephraim	
21	Fairview Amusement Hall	Fairview Amusement Hall	May 10, 2002 (#02000507)	75 S. State St. 39°37′38″N 111°26′18″W	Fairview	
22	Fairview City Hall	Fairview City Hall	April 9, 1986 (#86000745)	85 S. State St. 39°37′36″N 111°26′18″W	Fairview	
23	Fairview Tithing Office/Bishop's Storehouse	Fairview Tithing Office/Bishop's Storehouse	January 25, 1985 (#85000281)	60 W. 100 South; 39°37′36″N 111°26′23″W	Fairview	
24	Jabez Faux House and Barn	Jabez Faux House and Barn	November 7, 1976 (#76001835)	Approximately 74 N. State Route 132; 39°31′35″N 111°35′24″W	Moroni	Home of blacksmith and farmer immigrant from Yorkshire.
25	Fountain Green Hydroelectric Plant Historic District	Fountain Green Hydroelectric Plant Historic District	April 20, 1989 (#89000277)	Northwest of Fountain Green; 39°38′13″N 111°39′03″W	Fountain Green	Made up of two discontiguous pieces. The western piece, the earthen dam at Big Springs reservoir, was destroyed in 2017 to improve the fish hatchery.
26	Great Basin Research Station Historic District	Great Basin Research Station Historic District	June 28, 1996 (#96000678)	State Route 29, approximately 8 miles (13 km) east of Ephraim in the Manti-La Sal National Forest; 39°19′12″N 111°29′12″W	Ephraim	Experiment station set up to explore whether over-grazing caused floods downstream.
27	Greaves-Deakin House	Greaves-Deakin House	October 3, 1980 (#80003942)	118 S. Main St. 39°21′27″N 111°35′13″W	Ephraim	
28	Hans A. Hansen House	Hans A. Hansen House	October 22, 1980 (#80003943)	75 W. 100 North; 39°21′41″N 111°35′15″W	Ephraim	
29	Peter Hansen House	Peter Hansen House	February 1, 1983 (#83003187)	247 S. 200 East; 39°15′42″N 111°37′56″W	Manti	
30	Niels P. Hjort House	Niels P. Hjort House	October 3, 1980 (#80003946)	26 S. State St. 39°37′40″N 111°26′20″W	Fairview	
31	Frederick C. Jensen House		April 19, 1982 (#82004158)	215 S. 100 West; 39°32′37″N 111°27′25″W	Mount Pleasant	1891 house of Danish immigrant, Victorian Eclectic in style.
32	Hans C. Jensen House	Hans C. Jensen House	February 1, 1983 (#83003188)	263 E. 100 South; 39°21′29″N 111°34′49″W	Ephraim	Pair house built around 1870, two rooms deep.
33	Rasmus Jensen House	Rasmus Jensen House	February 1, 1983 (#83003189)	97 E. 100 South; 39°21′30″N 111°35′04″W	Ephraim	Vernacular pair house built probably in the 1870s
34	Robert Johnson House	Robert Johnson House	October 14, 1980 (#80003949)	103 E. 300 North; 39°16′13″N 111°38′02″W	Manti	
35	Johnson-Nielson House	Johnson-Nielson House	July 26, 1982 (#82004156)	351 N. Main St. 39°22′00″N 111°35′12″W	Ephraim	
36	Francis Marion Jolley House	Francis Marion Jolley House	October 14, 1980 (#80003950)	201 S. 200 E. 39°15′44″N 111°37′59″W	Manti	1875 brick house of English immigrant, with four dormer windows above first-floor window-door-window-window arrangement.
37	Oluf Larsen House	Oluf Larsen House	February 1, 1983 (#83003190)	75 S. 100 West; 39°21′31″N 111°35′21″W	Ephraim	Pair-house built in 1870.
38	Larsen-Noyes House	Larsen-Noyes House	December 1, 1978 (#78002688)	96 E. Center St. 39°21′34″N 111°35′01″W	Ephraim	
39	John T. Lewellyn House	John T. Lewellyn House	October 3, 1980 (#80003958)	15 N. State St. 39°29′09″N 111°38′07″W	Wales	Brick hall-and-parlor plan house built in 1875.
40	David and Evinda Madsen House	David and Evinda Madsen House	July 3, 2014 (#14000383)	65 N. 100 W. 39°21′40″N 111°35′23″W	Ephraim	Brick house built in 1900, with Italianate/Victorian Eclectic styling. David Madsen helped bring sheep ranching to the area.
41	Manti Carnegie Library	Manti Carnegie Library	October 25, 1984 (#84000150)	2 S. Main St. 39°15′54″N 111°38′14″W	Manti	Presumably a Carnegie library.
42	Manti City Hall	Manti City Hall	June 27, 1985 (#85001397)	191 N. Main St. 39°16′08″N 111°38′32″W	Manti	
43	Manti Motor Company Building	Manti Motor Company Building	May 7, 2008 (#08000384)	87 N. Main St. 39°16′00″N 111°38′13″W	Manti	
44	Manti National Guard Armory	Manti National Guard Armory	April 9, 1986 (#86000744)	50 E. 100 North; 39°16′00″N 111°38′08″W	Manti	
45	Manti Presbyterian Church	Manti Presbyterian Church	March 27, 1980 (#80003951)	185 S. Main St. 39°15′42″N 111°38′08″W	Manti	
46	Manti Temple	Manti Temple	August 12, 1971 (#71000854)	Northern edge of Manti, on U.S. Route 89; 39°16′23″N 111°37′59″W	Manti	
47	James and Caroline M. Metcalf House	James and Caroline M. Metcalf House	July 23, 1998 (#98000905)	290 E. 500 South; 39°08′43″N 111°48′32″W	Gunnison	
48	Moroni Cannery		July 16, 2026 (#100013210)	144 W. 100 South; 39°31′25″N 111°35′11″W	Moroni	
49	Moroni High School Mechanical Arts Building	Moroni High School Mechanical Arts Building	April 1, 1985 (#85000812)	350 N. Center St. 39°31′50″N 111°35′00″W	Moroni	Now with strange portico?
50	Moroni Opera House	Moroni Opera House	May 23, 1996 (#96000590)	325 W. Main St. 39°31′29″N 111°35′25″W	Moroni	Stone and brick building completed in 1891.
51	Mortensen-Nelson House	Mortensen-Nelson House	July 10, 2003 (#03000632)	291 E. 100 South; 39°31′25″N 111°34′43″W	Moroni	c.1885 brick double cross-wing house.
52	Mount Pleasant Carnegie Library	Mount Pleasant Carnegie Library	October 25, 1984 (#84000152)	24 E. Main St. 39°32′48″N 111°27′14″W	Mount Pleasant	Presumably another Carnegie library
53	Mount Pleasant Commercial Historic District	Mount Pleasant Commercial Historic District	October 26, 1979 (#79002508)	U.S. Route 89 and State Route 116; 39°32′46″N 111°27′22″W	Mount Pleasant	
54	Mount Pleasant High School Mechanical Arts Building	Mount Pleasant High School Mechanical Arts Building	April 1, 1985 (#85000813)	150 N. State St. 39°32′58″N 111°27′16″W	Mount Pleasant	1935-36 public works project
55	Mount Pleasant National Guard Armory	Mount Pleasant National Guard Armory	April 9, 1986 (#86000740)	10 N. State St. 39°32′50″N 111°27′17″W	Mount Pleasant	PWA Moderne armory built in 1936-37.
56	Jens Nielsen House	Jens Nielsen House	February 1, 1983 (#83003191)	192 W. 200 South; 39°21′23″N 111°35′30″W	Ephraim	C.1870 pair house of tripartite ("Type IV" type), with indented porch in center section.
57	John R. Nielson Cabin		June 8, 2004 (#03000772)	Forest Road 1232, about 9 miles (14 km) up Manti Canyon; 39°16′01″N 111°30′04″W	Manti	Log cabin built in 1948.
58	N.S. Nielson House	N.S. Nielson House	July 26, 1982 (#82004160)	179 W. Main St. 39°32′47″N 111°27′32″W	Mount Pleasant	Eclectic Victorian house built in 1892, home of a bank president and mayor, with unusual mansard-roofed tower.
59	Oberg-Metcalf House	Oberg-Metcalf House	November 24, 1997 (#97001464)	12 N. 100 East; 39°09′19″N 111°49′05″W	Gunnison	
60	Hans Peter Olsen House	Hans Peter Olsen House	April 22, 1976 (#76001834)	211 S. State St. 39°37′31″N 111°38′03″W	Fountain Green	"One of the finest pioneer brick homes in Sanpete County", built in 1877.
61	Olsen House and Mortuary		May 25, 2022 (#100007779)	315 S. 200 East; 39°21′15″N 111°34′53″W	Ephraim	
62	Hans Ottesen House	Hans Ottesen House	August 6, 1987 (#87001177)	202 S. 200 West; 39°15′44″N 111°38′28″W	Manti	Pair-house of Danish immigrant.
63	John Patten House	John Patten House	August 22, 1977 (#77001315)	NE corner of W. 300 N. and N. 100 W. 39°16′12″N 111°38′19″W	Manti	Primitive vernacular two-story house, built in 1854.
64	Pectol-Works House	Pectol-Works House	July 30, 2019 (#100004223)	96 W. 400 North; 39°16′17″N 111°38′19″W	Manti	
65	Canute Peterson House	Canute Peterson House	July 17, 1978 (#78002689)	10 N. Main St. 39°21′36″N 111°35′09″W	Ephraim	
66	Poulsen-Hall House	Poulsen-Hall House	April 27, 2011 (#11000235)	90 S. 100 East; 39°15′51″N 111°38′07″W	Manti	
67	Morten Rasmussen House	Morten Rasmussen House	August 18, 1977 (#77001317)	12 S. 400 West; 39°32′47″N 111°27′46″W	Mount Pleasant	
68	Sanpete County Courthouse	Sanpete County Courthouse	April 1, 1985 (#85000811)	160 N. Main St. 39°16′05″N 111°38′09″W	Manti	
69	William Stuart Seeley House	William Stuart Seeley House	July 16, 1992 (#92000894)	150 S. State St. 39°32′41″N 111°27′18″W	Mount Pleasant	
70	John H. Seely House	John H. Seely House	March 9, 1982 (#82004159)	91 S. 500 West; 39°32′44″N 111°27′50″W	Mount Pleasant	
71	Ezra and Abigail Shomaker House	Ezra and Abigail Shomaker House	October 15, 2014 (#14000864)	194 W. 400 North; 39°16′17″N 111°38′26″W	Manti	
72	Snow Academy Building	Snow Academy Building	November 20, 1987 (#87002062)	150 College Ave. 39°21′40″N 111°34′56″W	Ephraim	
73	Dykes Sorensen House		October 20, 1982 (#82001756)	302 S. 200 East; 39°21′15″N 111°34′56″W	Ephraim	Pair house, apparently incomplete two-room version of what would have been a three-room plan, built c.1870.
74	Fredrick Christian Sorensen House	Fredrick Christian Sorensen House	October 14, 1980 (#80003944)	62 E. Center St. 39°21′35″N 111°35′06″W	Ephraim	
75	Spring City Historic District	Spring City Historic District	October 22, 1980 (#80003957)	State Route 117; 39°28′37″N 111°29′47″W	Spring City	
76	Spring City School	Spring City School	November 14, 1978 (#78002691)	45 S. 100 East; 39°28′40″N 111°29′35″W	Spring City	
77	Alma Staker House	Alma Staker House	July 9, 1979 (#79002509)	81 E. 300 South; 39°32′33″N 111°27′14″W	Mount Pleasant	Built in eastern style, of western materials.
78	James B. Staker House	James B. Staker House	October 3, 1980 (#80003954)	211 N. State St. 39°33′00″N 111°27′19″W	Mount Pleasant	
79	Tuttle-Folsom House	Tuttle-Folsom House	July 21, 1977 (#77001316)	195 W. 300 North; 39°16′10″N 111°38′26″W	Manti	Stone house with early Saltbox-type addition to the rear.
80	Franklin and Arletta Cox Tuttle House		July 16, 2026 (#100013218)	482 West 400 North; 39°16′17″N 111°38′46″W	Manti	
81	Wales Co-operative Mercantile Institution	Wales Co-operative Mercantile Institution	September 29, 2000 (#00001176)	150 N. State St. 39°29′15″N 111°38′06″W	Wales	Western false front one-story building
82	Wasatch Academy	Wasatch Academy	October 2, 1978 (#78002690)	200 S. 100 West; 39°32′39″N 111°27′26″W	Mount Pleasant	
83	Watkins-Tholman-Larsen Farmstead	Watkins-Tholman-Larsen Farmstead	December 27, 1996 (#96001531)	422 E. 400 South; 39°32′26″N 111°26′51″W	Mount Pleasant	Property with historic picket fence, clapboarded log house, granary, barn, blacksmith shop, and stone chicken coop.
84	Cyrus Wheelock House		October 3, 1980 (#80003955)	200 E. 100 North; 39°32′55″N 111°27′05″W	Mount Pleasant	Adobe house built around 1860. Appears to have been considerably transformed in recent years.

== Former listing ==
	Name on the Register	Image	Date listed	Date removed	Location	City or town	Description
1	George Washington Bradley House		October 22, 1980 (#80003952)	August 26, 1983	100 S. 200 West	Moroni	

== See also ==
- List of National Historic Landmarks in Utah
- National Register of Historic Places listings in Utah
