= Manti City Hall =

- Historic Manti City Hall
- U.S. National Register of Historic Places
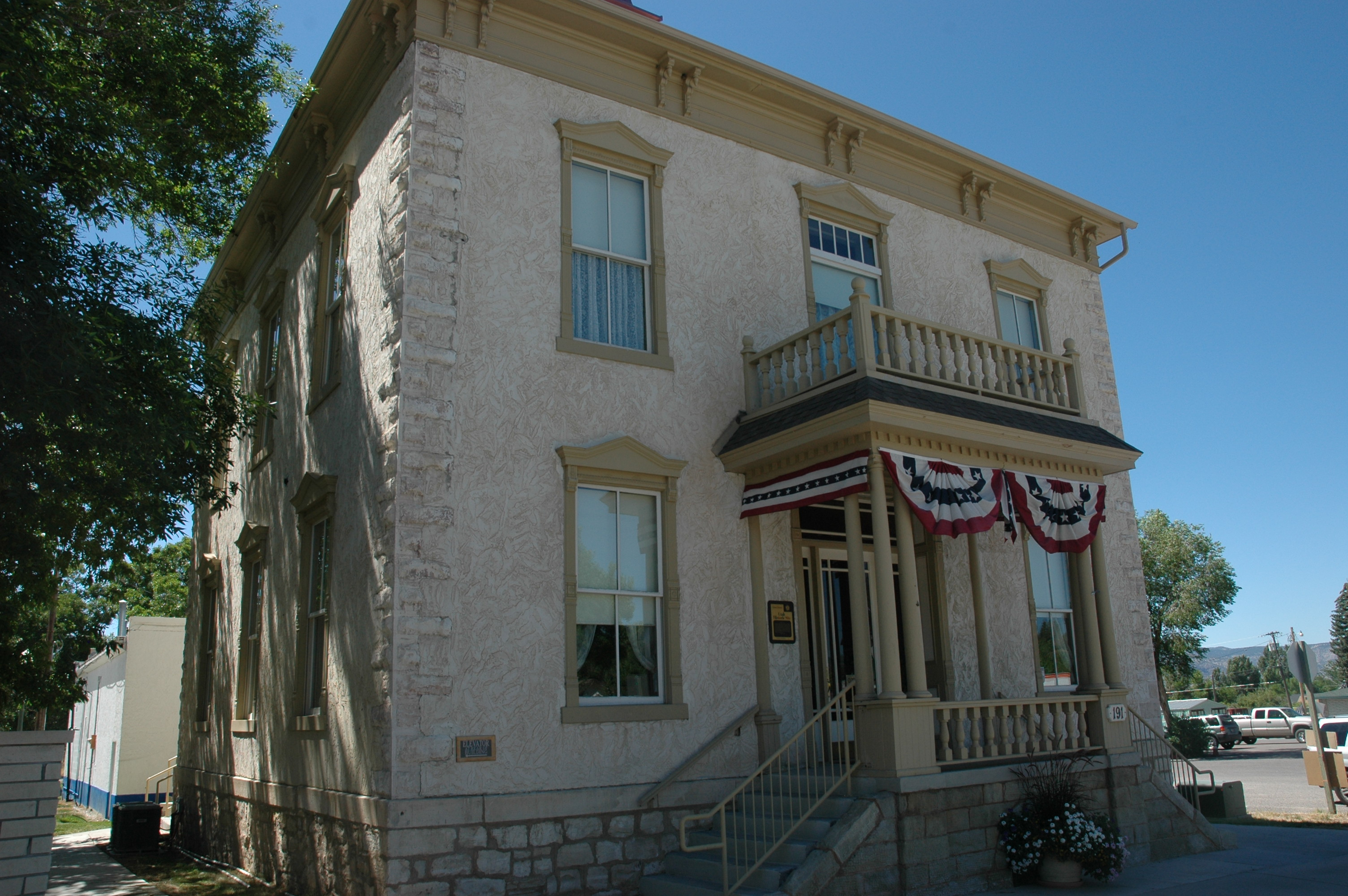
- The building in 2011

- Location within Utah Location within the United States
- Location: 191 North Main, Manti, Utah
- Coordinates: 39°16′08″N 111°30′32″W
- Area: less than one acre
- Architectural style: Italianate
- NRHP reference No.: 85001397
- Added to NRHP: June 27, 1985

Historic Manti City Hall is a historical building in Manti, Utah. Designed by A.E. Merriam in the Italianate architectural style, it was constructed between 1873-1882 at a cost of approximately $1,100. It served as the city hall of Manti from 1882 to 1986. It has been listed on the National Register of Historic Places since June 27, 1985. The building is now used as a museum, social hall, and office of Sanpete County Economic Development & Travel and Tourism office, and houses a visitor’s information center. The current city hall is located at 50 South Main Street in the Manti City Building.
