= Niels P. Hjort House =

- U.S. National Register of Historic Places
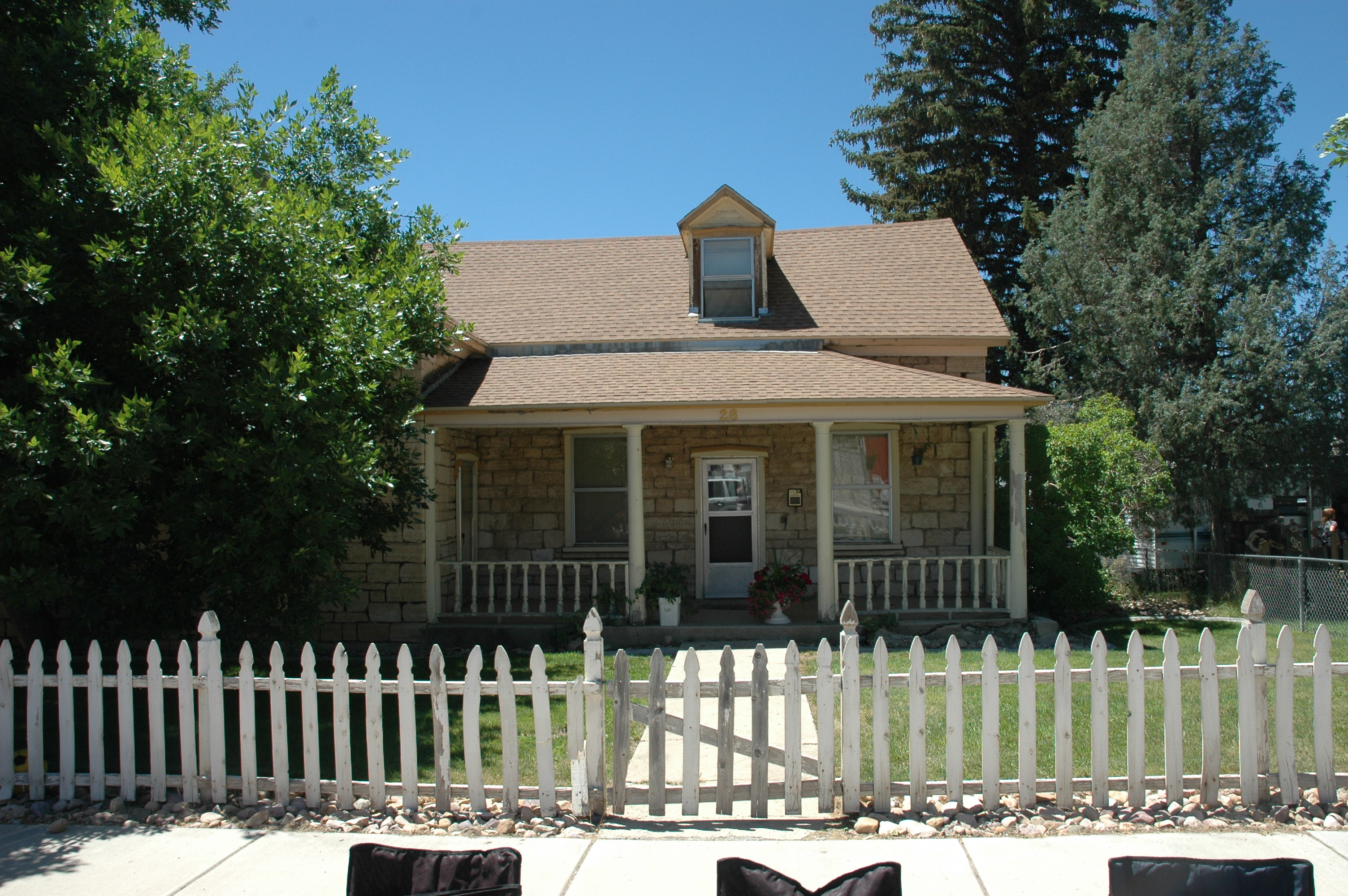
- The house in 2011

- Location within Utah Location within the United States
- Location: North Main Street, Fairview, Utah
- Coordinates: 39°37′40″N 111°26′20″W
- Area: less than one acre
- Built: 1878
- Architectural style: Greek Revival
- NRHP reference No.: 80003946
- Added to NRHP: October 3, 1980

The Niels P. Hjort House is a historic house in Fairview, Utah. It was built with limestone in 1878 by Niels P. Hjort, an immigrant from Norway who converted to the Church of Jesus Christ of Latter-day Saints and settled in Fairview in 1870. His house was designed in the Greek Revival style. It has been listed on the National Register of Historic Places since October 3, 1980.
