= Hans A. Hansen House =

- U.S. National Register of Historic Places
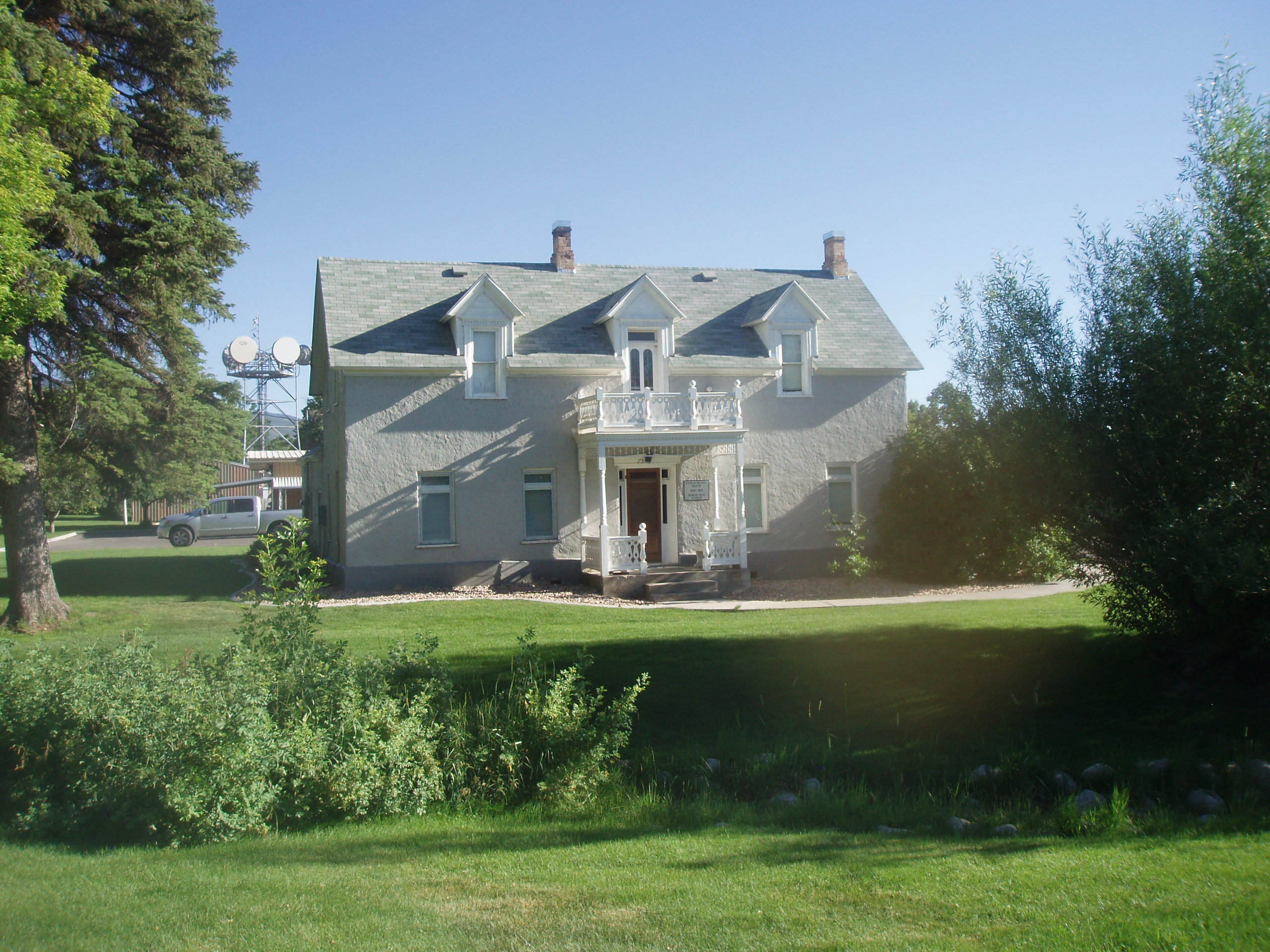
- The house in 2011

- Location within Utah Location within the United States
- Location: 75 West 100 North, Ephraim, Utah
- Coordinates: 39°21′41″N 111°35′15″W
- Area: less than one acre
- Built: 1862
- Architectural style: Vernacular English
- NRHP reference No.: 80003943
- Added to NRHP: October 22, 1980

The Hans A. Hansen House is a historic house in Ephraim, Utah. It was built in 1862 by Hans A. Hansen, an immigrant from Denmark who converted to the Church of Jesus Christ of Latter-day Saints and arrived in Utah in 1853. Hansen had two wives: Annie, who had emigrated to the United States with him, and Mary Christiansen. He built a second house in the Scandinavian style, but this house was designed in a Vernacular English, or "traditionally American", style, which is interpreted by Tom Carter of the Utah State Historical Society as Hansen's willingness to integrate into American society. The house has been listed on the National Register of Historic Places since October 22, 1980.
