= Jabez Faux House and Barn =

- Jabez Faux House And Barn
- U.S. National Register of Historic Places
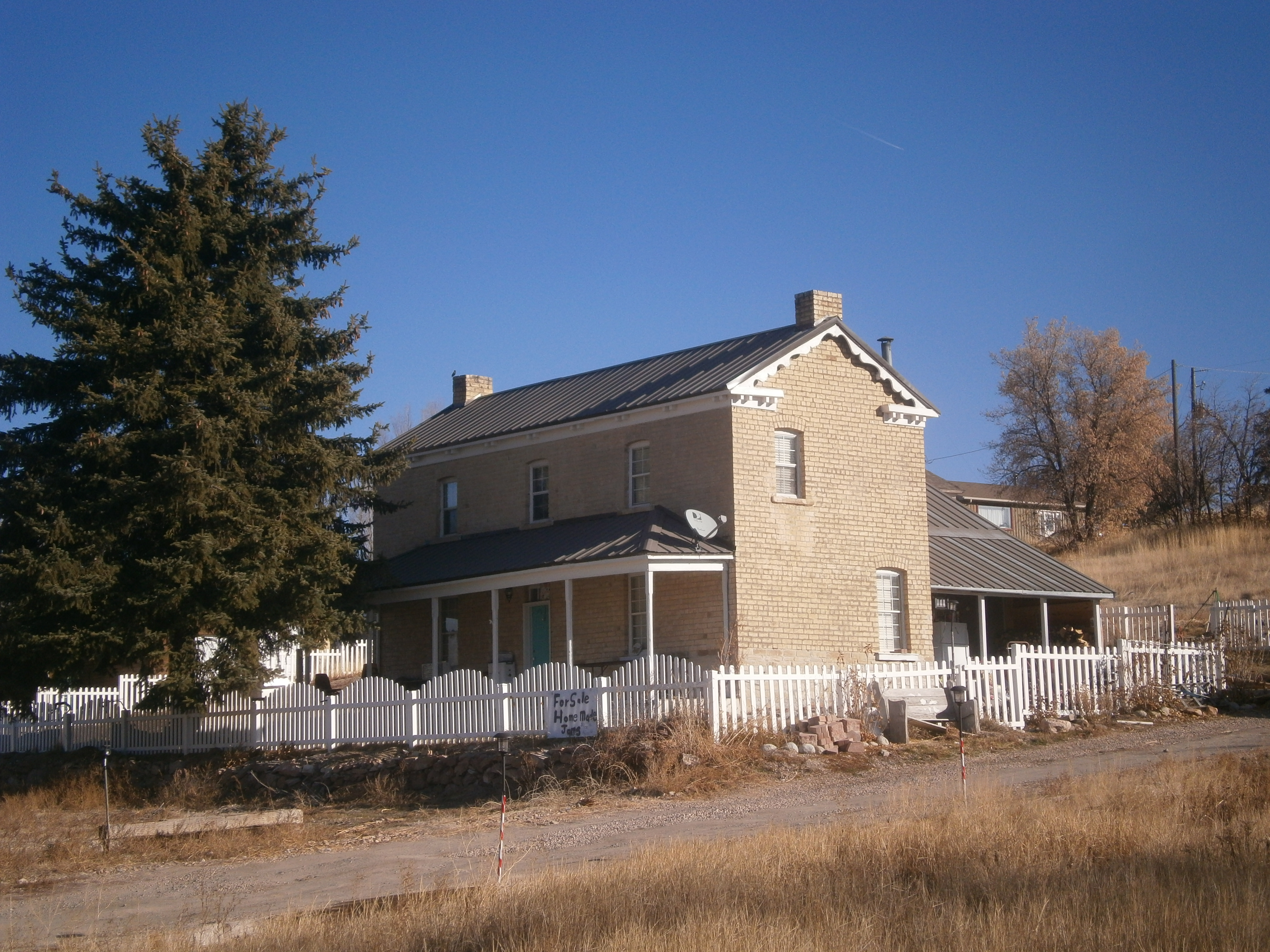

- Location within Utah Location within the United States
- Location: UT 132, Moroni, Utah
- Coordinates: 39°31′35″N 111°35′24″W
- Area: less than one acre
- Built: 1867
- NRHP reference No.: 76001835
- Added to NRHP: November 7, 1976

The Jabez Faux House and Barn is a historic two-story house and a barn in Moroni, Utah. It was built in 1867 by Jabez Faux (b.1837), an immigrant from Yorkshire, England who converted to the Church of Jesus Christ of Latter-day Saints and settled in Moroni in 1860. He built a dugout, then later a log cabin, then eventually this house in which he lived for more than 55 years. Faux was a blacksmith and a farmer, and he served on the board of the Moroni Cooperative Mercantile Institution.

The house was deemed significant "as an excellent example of one of the first brick pioneer homes constructed in the Sanpete Valley. It is also important as the home of one of the community's leaders of Moroni." The house was vacant from 1950 to 1970, when it was purchased and renovated by Wilsford Clark. It has been listed on the National Register of Historic Places since November 7, 1976.

It is the first house south of N. 80 Street, on the east side of Utah State Route 132 (also known as N. Ducksprings Rd. and as N. 325 West St.).
