= N.S. Nielson House =

- N. S. Nielson House
- U.S. National Register of Historic Places
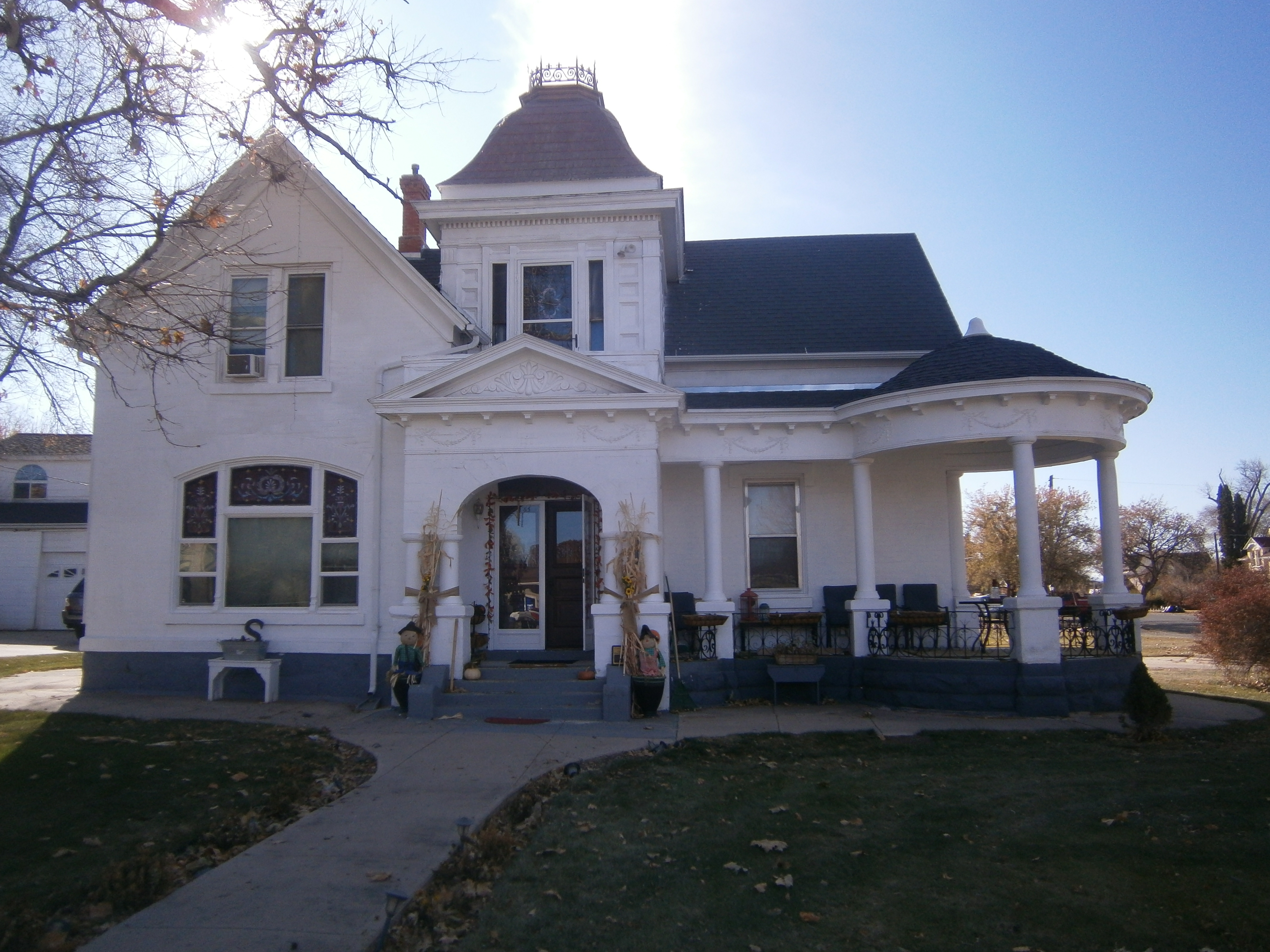

- Location within Utah Location within the United States
- Location: 179 West Main Street, Mount Pleasant, Utah
- Coordinates: 39.546458°N 111.458794°W
- Area: less than one acre
- Built: 1892
- Architectural style: Victorian Eclectic
- NRHP reference No.: 82004160
- Added to NRHP: July 26, 1982

The N. S. Nielson House is a historic house in Mount Pleasant, Utah. It was built in 1892 for N. S. Nielson, an immigrant from Sweden who converted to the Church of Jesus Christ of Latter-day Saints and settled in Utah in 1868. Nielson became a large sheep farmer. He was also president of the Mount Pleasant Commercial and Savings Bank, and the mayor of Mount Pleasant from 1896 to 1897. His house was designed in the Victorian Eclectic architectural style, with Second Empire, Queen Anne, and Beaux-Arts Classical features, and a "two-story square tower with a bell-cast mansard roof." It has been listed on the National Register of Historic Places since July 26, 1982.
