= James and Caroline M. Metcalf House =

- U.S. National Register of Historic Places
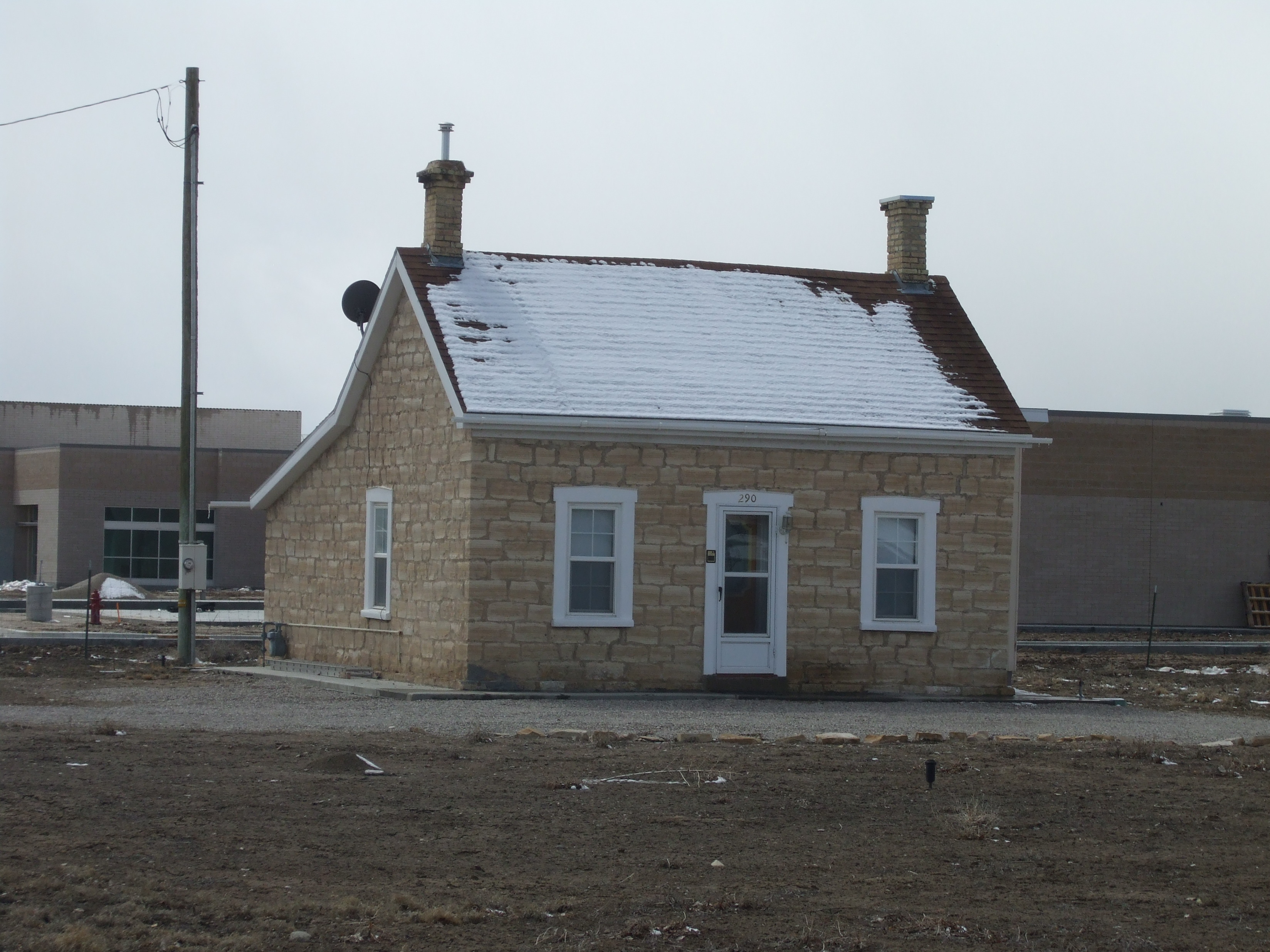
- The house in 2010

- Location within Utah Location within the United States
- Location: 290 East 500 South, Gunnison, Utah
- Coordinates: 39°08′43″N 111°48′32″W
- Area: 0.7 acres (0.28 ha)
- Built: 1883
- Architectural style: Classical Revival
- NRHP reference No.: 98000905
- Added to NRHP: July 23, 1998

The James and Caroline M. Metcalf House is a historic house in Gunnison, Utah. It was built in 1883, probably for James Metcalf, an immigrant from England who became a sheep and livestock farmer in Utah, and his Denmark-born wife Caroline, the daughter of Hans Larsen, who gave them the plot of land. However, the Metcalfs may have owned but not lived in the house. It was a hall-parlor plan house with Classical Revival-style details. It has been listed on the National Register of Historic Places since July 23, 1998.
