= Fairview City Hall =

- U.S. National Register of Historic Places
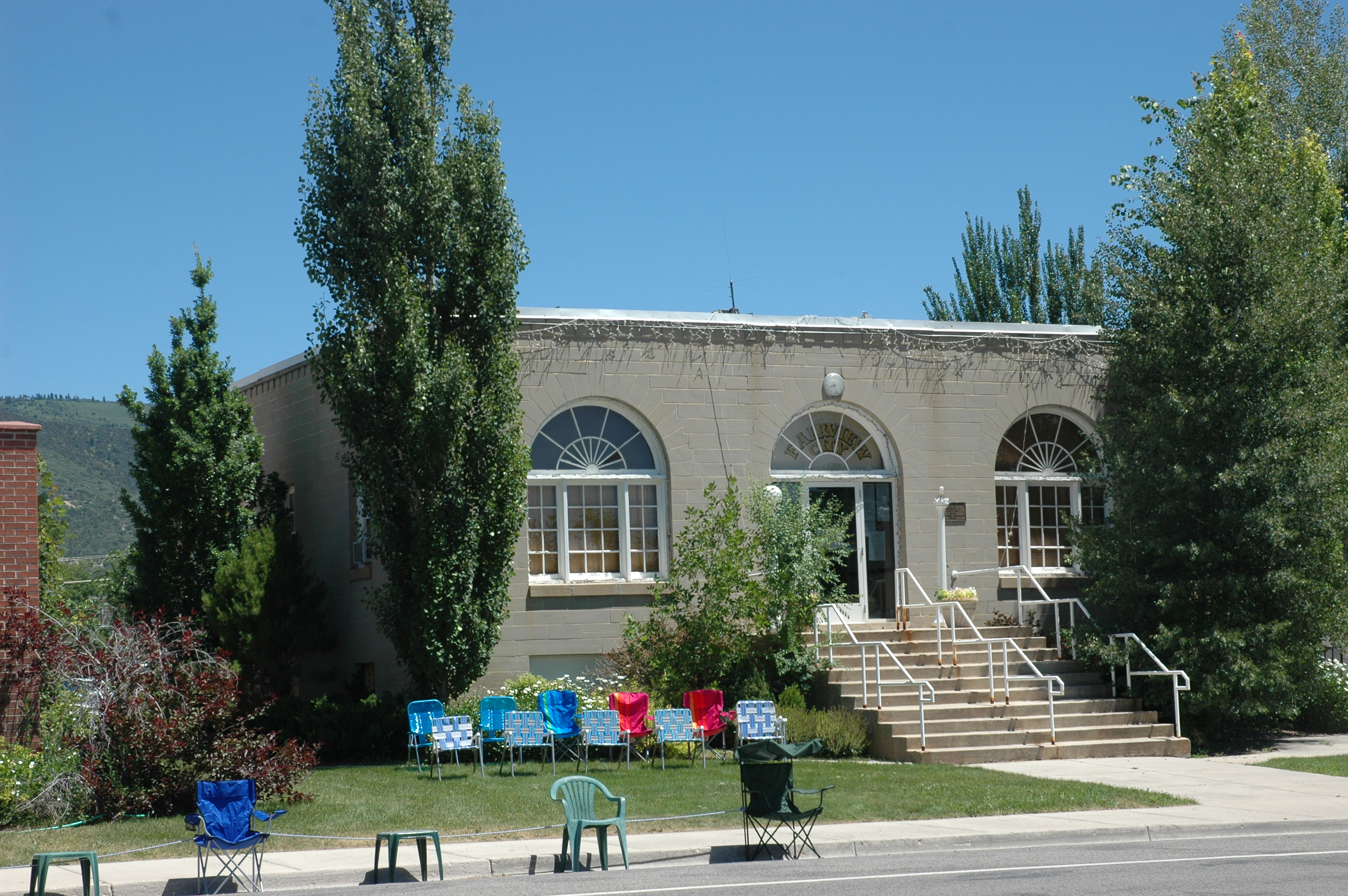
- The building in 2011

- Location within Utah Location within the United States
- Location: 85 South State, Fairview, Utah
- Coordinates: 39°37′36″N 111°26′18″W
- Area: less than one acre
- Built: 1936
- Built by: Oscar Amundson
- Architect: Hugh Anderson
- Architectural style: Moderne
- MPS: Public Works Buildings TR
- NRHP reference No.: 86000745
- Added to NRHP: April 9, 1986

The Fairview City Hall is a historic building in Fairview, Utah. It was built by Oscar Amundson in 1936 as the city hall of Fairview under the Public Works Administration program, and designed by architect Hugh Anderson. It has been listed on the National Register of Historic Places since April 9, 1986.
