= Francis Marion Jolley House =

- U.S. National Register of Historic Places
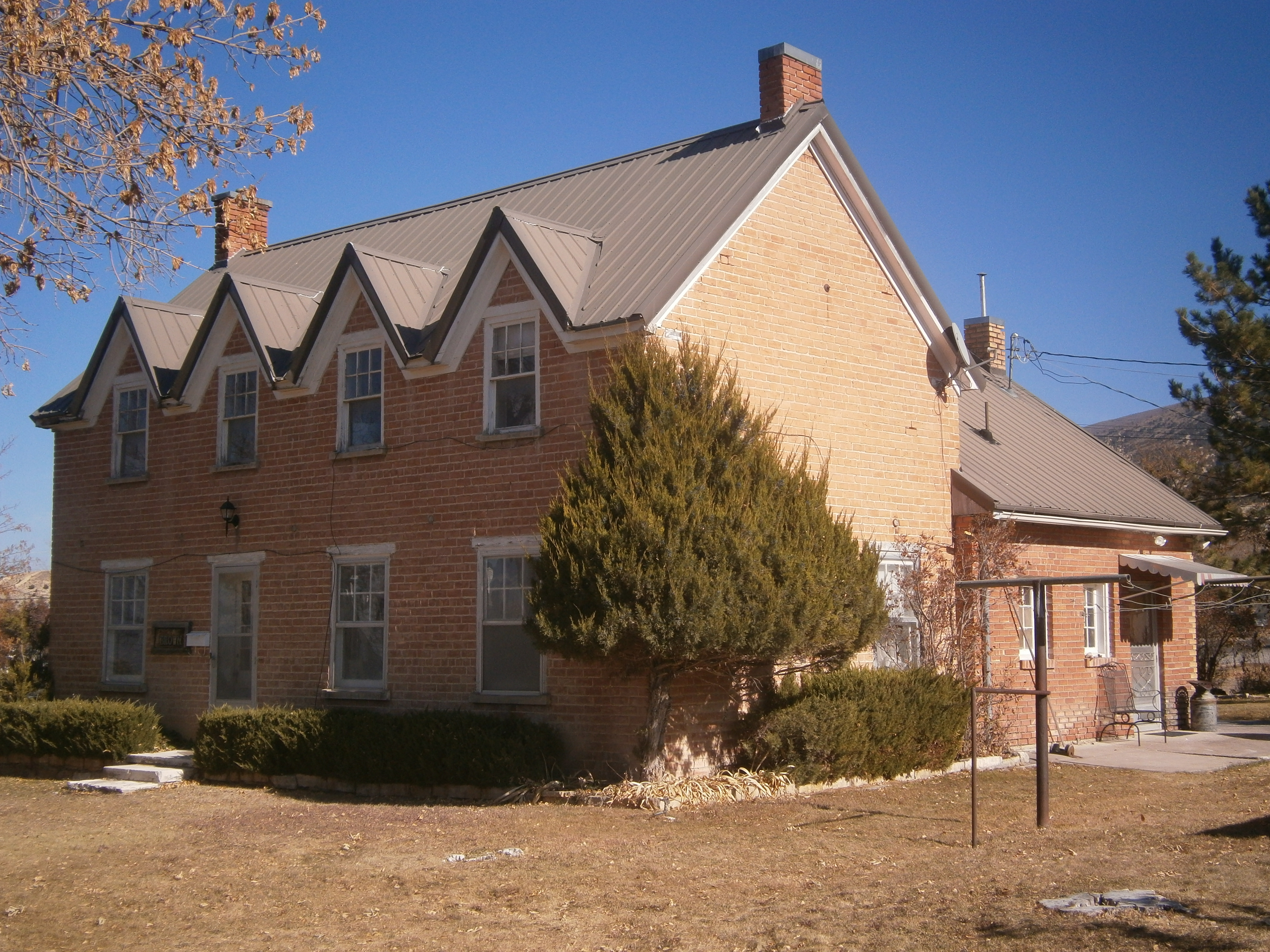

- Location within Utah Location within the United States
- Location: 201 S. 200 East, Manti, Utah
- Coordinates: 39.262296°N 111.633051°W
- Area: less than one acre
- Built: c.1875
- Architectural style: Sanpete domestic vernacular
- NRHP reference No.: 80003950
- Added to NRHP: October 14, 1980

The Francis Marion Jolley House is a historic house at 202 East 200 South in Manti, Utah. It was built around 1875 for Francis Marion Jolley, an immigrant from England who converted to the Church of Jesus Christ of Latter-day Saints and settled in Manti in 1853. Jolley lived here with his wife Chelnecha, and he worked as a farmer and carpenter. The house has been listed on the National Register of Historic Places since October 14, 1980.

Brick walls, three bricks thick, two of adobe and one of fired brick, continue all the way up to top of four dormer windows in second floor, centered above window-door-window-window arrangement on first floor. Main portion is 34 by 18 feet (10.4 m × 5.5 m) in plan. Small adobe room extending out from rear probably predates the main portion.

The house faces west on a southeast corner, and has address 201 S. 200 East.
