= Ephraim Carnegie Library =

- U.S. National Register of Historic Places
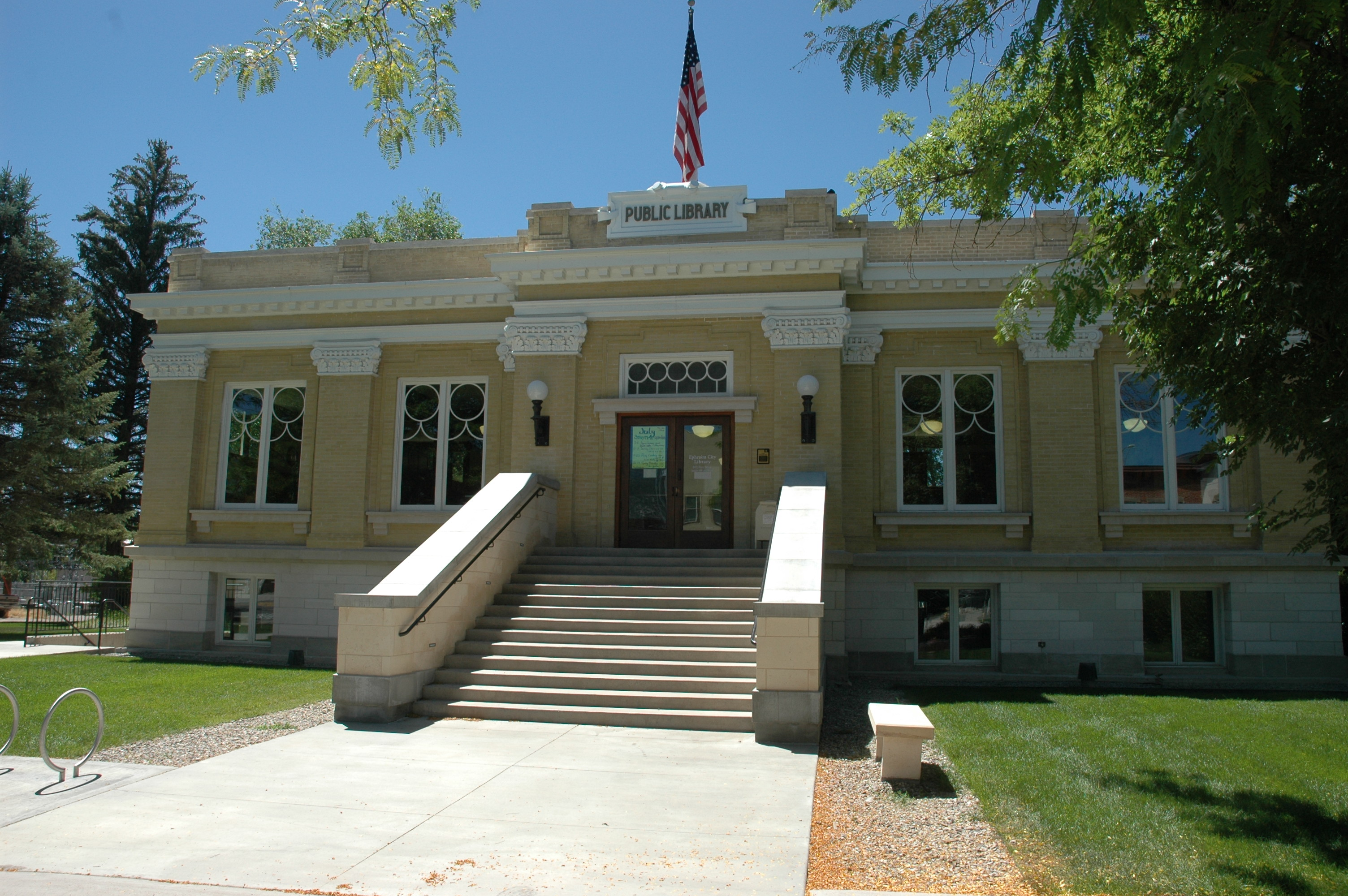
- The building in 2011

- Location within Utah Location within the United States
- Location: 30 South Main Street, Ephraim, Utah
- Coordinates: 39°22′05″N 111°35′12″W
- Area: less than one acre
- Built: 1914
- Built by: Hans Peterson, A.C. Nielson, Thors Monsen
- Architect: Watkins, Birch & Wright
- Architectural style: Beaux Arts
- MPS: Carnegie Library TR
- NRHP reference No.: 84000149
- Added to NRHP: October 25, 1984

The Ephraim Carnegie Library is a historic one-story building in Ephraim, Utah. It was built in 1914–1915 by Hans Peterson, A.C. Nielson, and Thors Monsen as a Carnegie library.

It was designed in the Beaux-Arts style by Watkins, Birch and Wright. It has been listed on the National Register of Historic Places since October 25, 1984.
