= James Anderson House (Fairview, Utah) =

- U.S. National Register of Historic Places
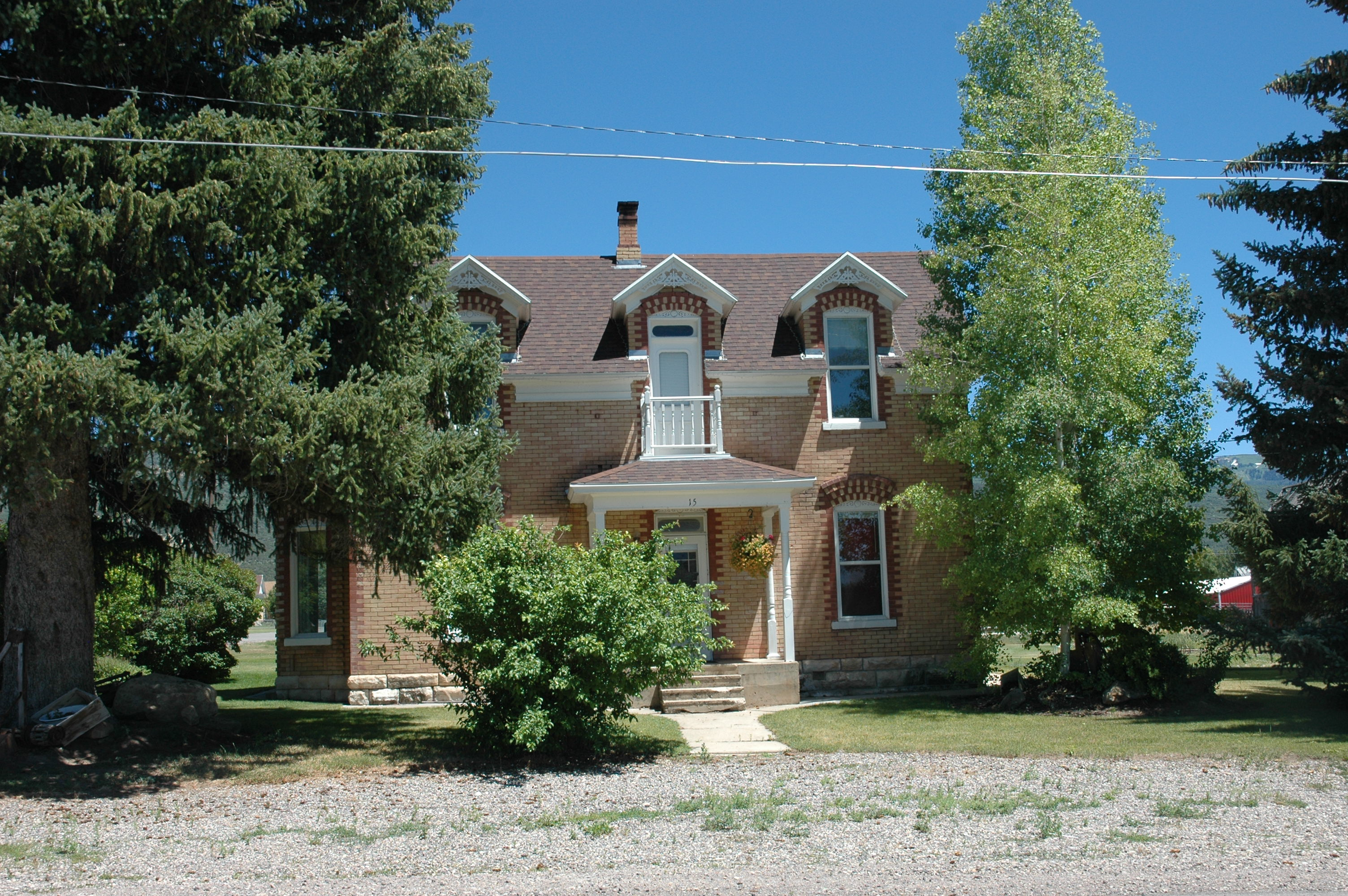
- The house in 2011

- Location within Utah Location within the United States
- Location: 15 South 200 East, Fairview, Utah
- Coordinates: 39°37′40″N 111°26′03″W
- Area: less than one acre
- Built: 1880
- Architectural style: Mixed (more Than 2 Styles From Different Periods), hall & parlor
- NRHP reference No.: 80003945
- Added to NRHP: October 3, 1980

The James Anderson House is a historic house in Fairview, Utah. It was built in 1880 for James Anderson, an immigrant from Scotland whose parents converted to the Church of Jesus Christ of Latter-day Saints before settling in Utah in 1860. Anderson became a sheep farmer and landowner, and he was also the president of the Fairview Co-op, and he served on the boards of directors of the Fairview State Bank and the Union Roller Mills. He lived here with his wife, née Hannah M. Cheney. The house has been listed on the National Register of Historic Places since October 3, 1980.
