= Pectol-Works House =

- U.S. National Register of Historic Places
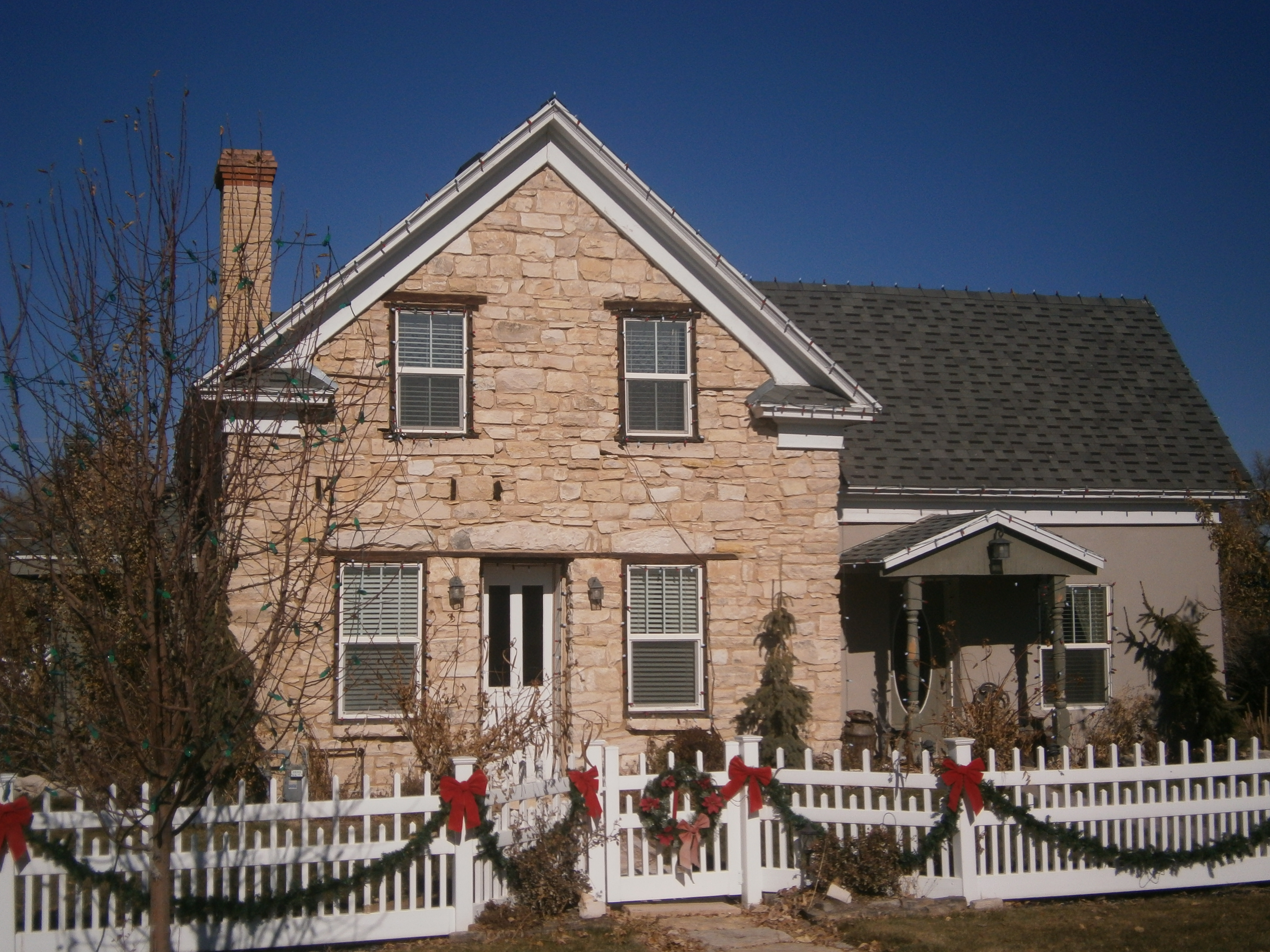

- Location within Utah Location within the United States
- Location: 96 West 400 North, Manti, Utah
- Coordinates: 39°16′17″N 111°38′19″W
- Area: .264 acres (0.107 ha)
- Built: 1851, 1863
- NRHP reference No.: 100004223
- Added to NRHP: July 30, 2019

The Pectol-Works House, at 96 West 400 North in Manti, Utah, was listed on the National Register of Historic Places in 2019.

It was built in two phases, in 1851 and 1863.

== See also ==
- John Patten House, across the street, also NRHP-listed
