= Manti Motor Company Building =

- U.S. National Register of Historic Places
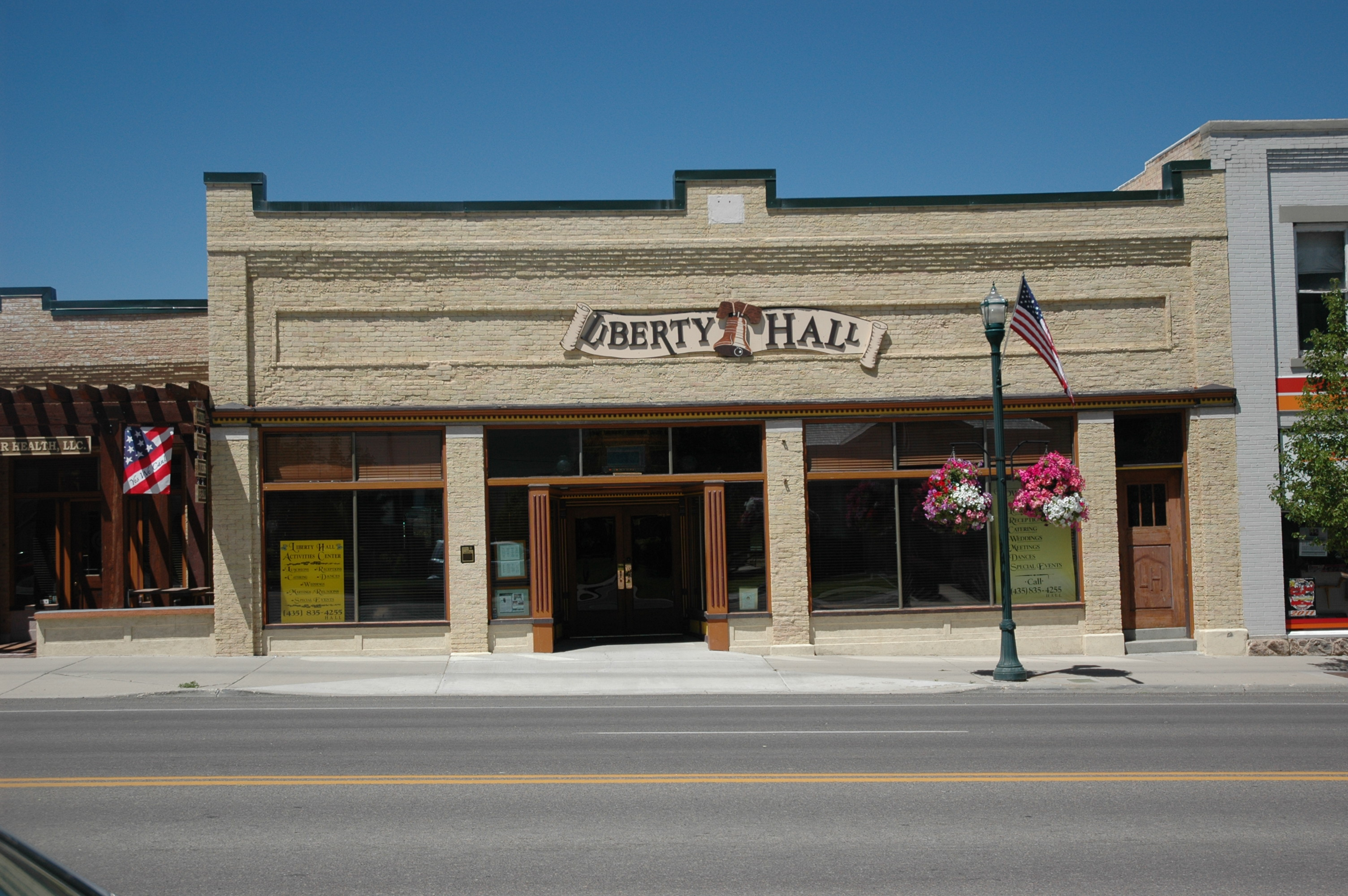

- Location within Utah Location within the United States
- Location: 87 N. Main St., Manti, Utah
- Coordinates: 39°16′00″N 111°38′13″W
- Area: 0.7 acres (0.28 ha)
- Built: 1916
- Architect: Lauritz Peder Miller
- Architectural style: Late 19th and 20th Century Revivals
- NRHP reference No.: 08000384
- Added to NRHP: May 7, 2008

The Manti Motor Company Building, also known as the Utah-Idaho Motor Company Building and Nell's Motor in Manti, Utah, was built in 1916. It was listed on the National Register of Historic Places in 2008. The building was designed by Lauritz Peder Miller.
