= Anthony W. Bessey House =

- U.S. National Register of Historic Places
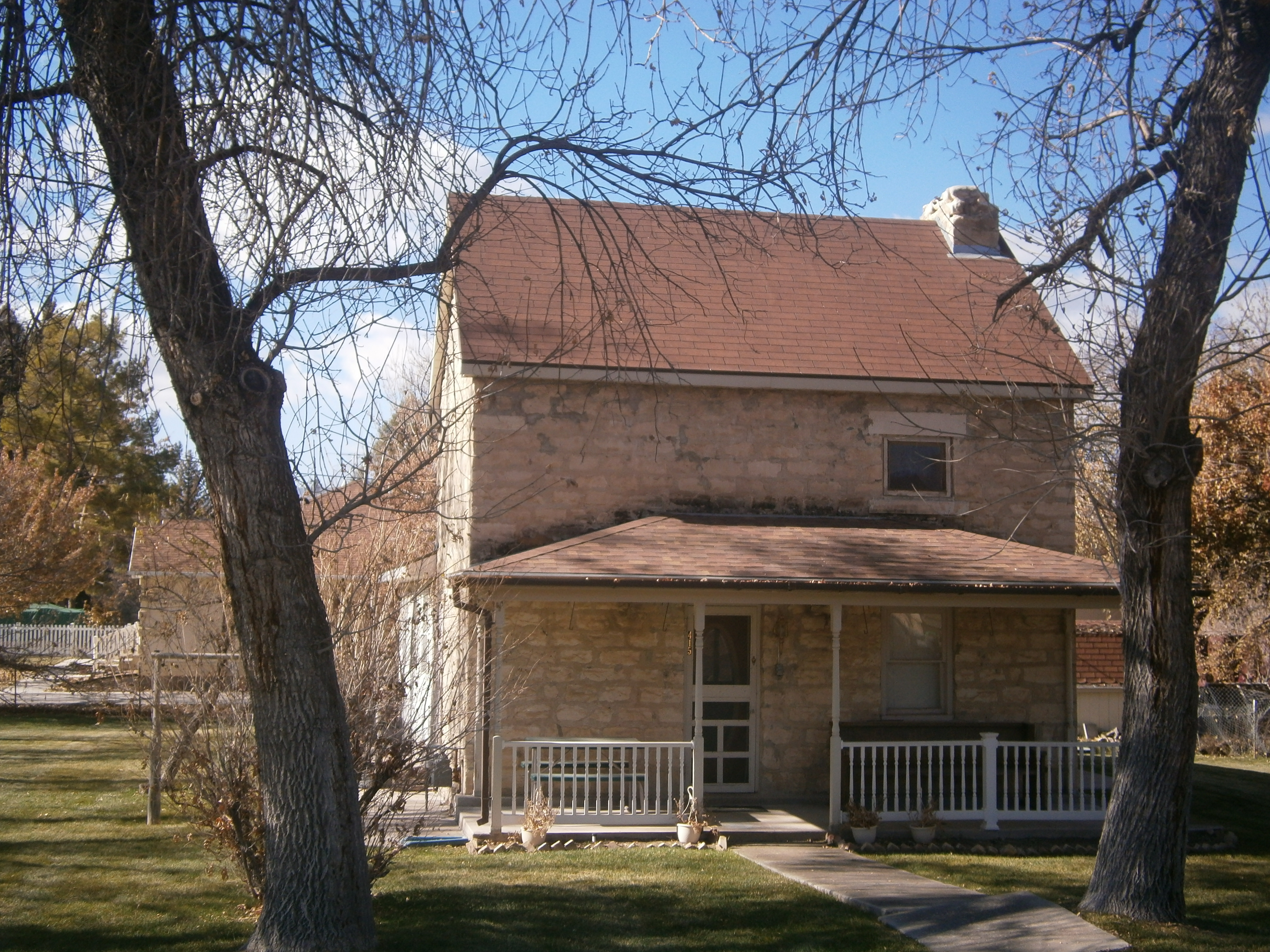

- Location within Utah Location within the United States
- Location: 415 N. 300 West, Manti, Utah
- Coordinates: 39.271554°N 111.642940°W
- Area: less than one acre
- Built: c.1860
- Architectural style: Sanpete vernacular
- NRHP reference No.: 80003947
- Added to NRHP: October 22, 1980

The Anthony W. Bessey House, at 415 N. 300 West in Manti, Utah, was built around 1860. It was listed on the National Register of Historic Places in 1980.

One-and-a-half-story oolitic limestone house, 22 by 17 feet (6.7 m × 5.2 m) in plan. It was one of the first group of homes built outside the Manti forts.

According to its NRHP nomination, "The house is typical of smaller, more inexpensive homes built by the pioneers. Despite its rather distinctive facade, this house gains its architectural and historical significance through its unexceptional nature, i.e., its ability to define the capabilities of the average."

It is located on the northwest corner of N. 300 West and W. 400 North.
