= John T. Lewellyn House =

- U.S. National Register of Historic Places
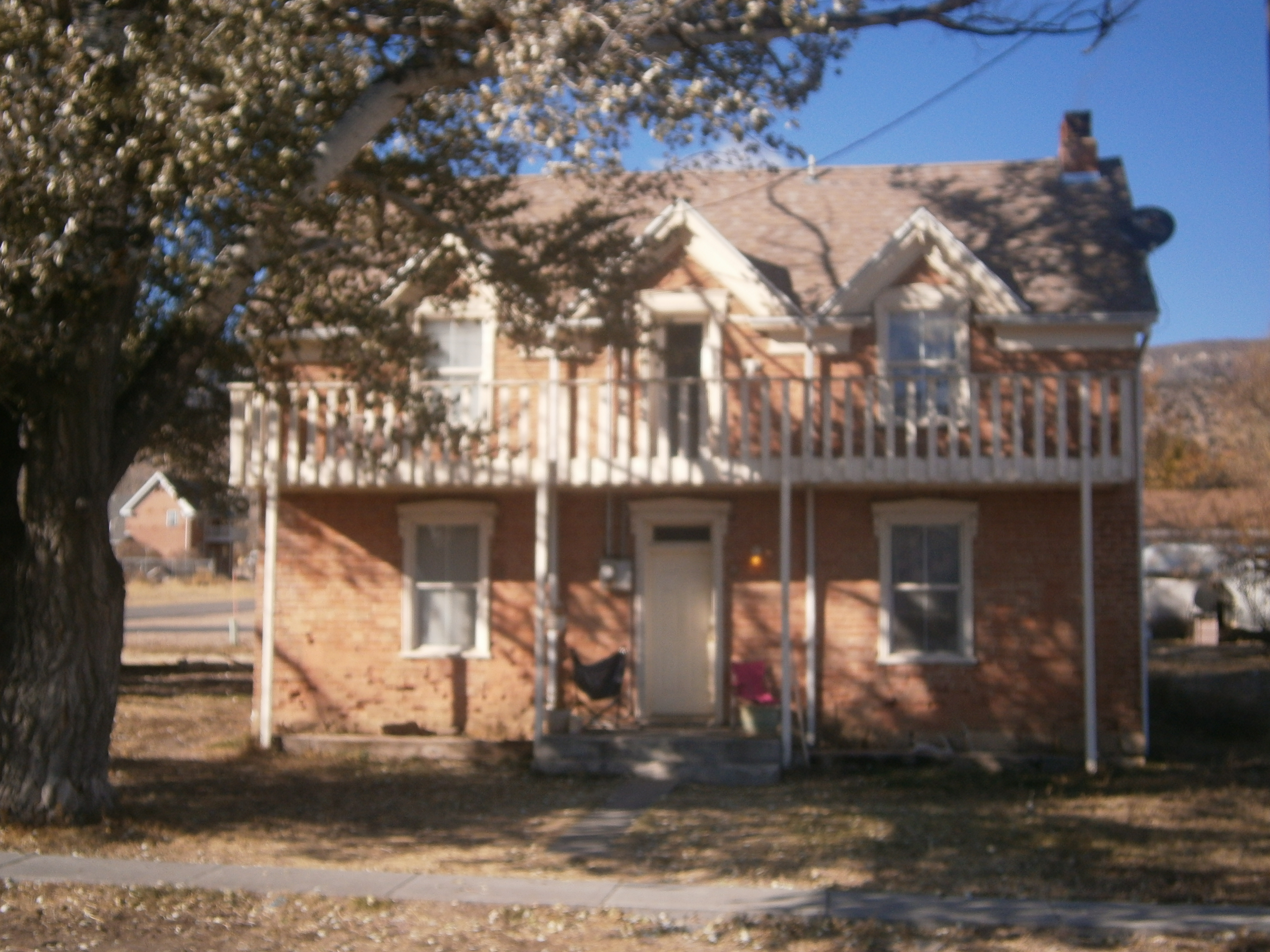

- Location within Utah Location within the United States
- Location: Main St., Wales, Utah
- Coordinates: 39.485730°N 111.635402°W
- Area: 1.3 acres (0.53 ha)
- Built: 1875
- Architectural style: Utah folk/vernacular
- NRHP reference No.: 80003958
- Added to NRHP: October 3, 1980

The John T. Lewellyn House in Wales, Utah was built in 1875. It was listed on the National Register of Historic Places in 1980.

It is located at 15 N. State St. in Wales, on the northeast corner of Center St. and State St.

It is a one-and-a-half-story brick hall and parlor plan house, about 34 by 17 feet (10.4 m × 5.2 m) in its main section. A one-and-a-half-story rear "T" extension was built at the same time.

It was deemed "significant as an outstanding example of Utah folk/vernacular architectural design."

The brick is laid in common bond and there is an interesting quirk in local brickwork that is evident in this house:

The Lewellyn house is built of locally fired brick. The brickyard was located south of town and produced a high quality red product found extensively throughout the town - indeed, brick is the main building material in Wales. Clay with a high ferrioxide content produces the red brick, it is durable and requires only a moderate burning temperature. The brick bonding here is the common type. Wales brick homes have one curious feature which should be mentioned here. Several "header" (bricks place side by side with heads exposed) rows have missing bricks - a condition which suggests that holes are present in the walls. In fact, the holes caused by the absence of these headers do not go all the way through the wall, but only one brick length and are closed by the second layer of bricks. One local explanation is that these holes were used by the masons to secure their scaffolding and then never filled in. This could be the case, though there is no direct evidence for this explanation.

Also known as the Lamb House, it was sold by Llewellyn to the Lamb family in 1885 for the "respectable" price of $1,000, and remained in the Lamb family at least until 1980.
