= Johnson-Nielson House =

- U.S. National Register of Historic Places
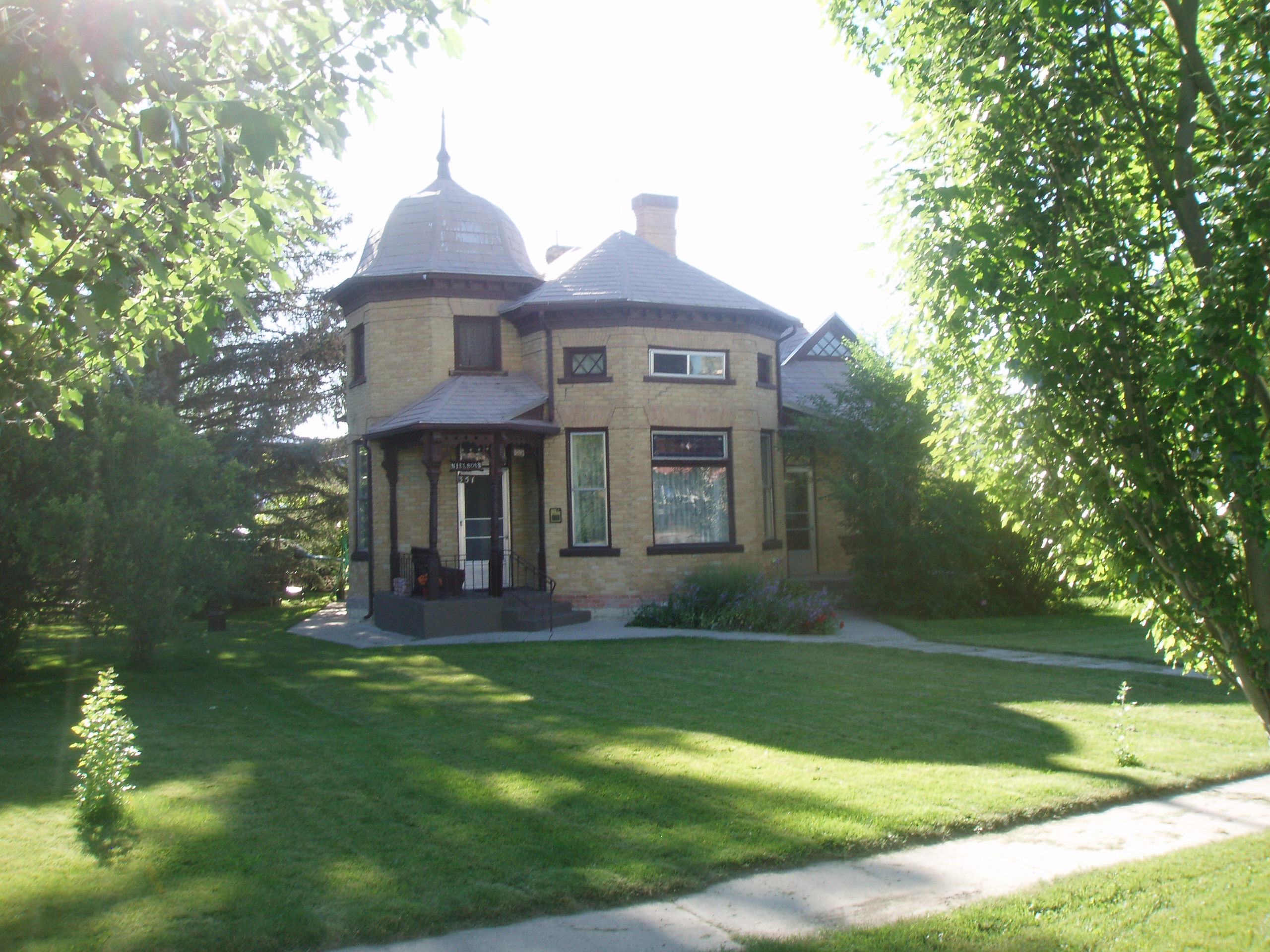

- Location within Utah Location within the United States
- Location: 351 N. Main St., Ephraim, Utah
- Coordinates: 39°22′00″N 111°35′12″W
- Area: less than one acre
- Built: 1895
- Built by: Johnson, Soren J.
- Architectural style: Queen Anne
- NRHP reference No.: 82004156
- Added to NRHP: July 26, 1982

The Johnson-Nielson House, at 351 N. Main St. in Ephraim, Utah, was built in 1895. It was listed on the National Register of Historic Places in 1982.

It is a one-and-a-half-story Queen Anne-style brick house built by Danish-born contractor Soren J. Johnson.

It has also been known as the Glen and Virginia Nielson House.
