= Ezra and Abigail Shomaker House =

- U.S. National Register of Historic Places
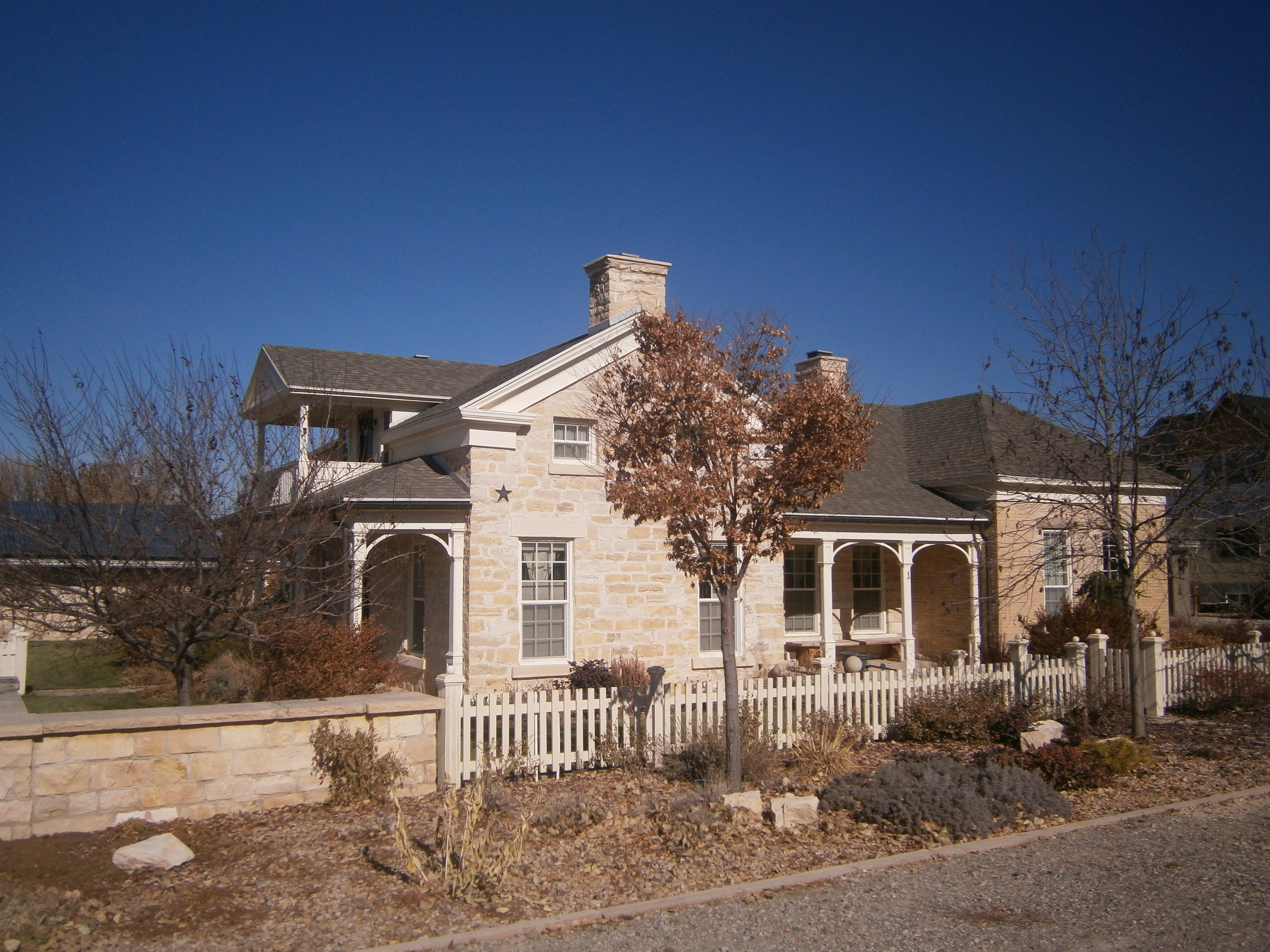

- Location within Utah Location within the United States
- Location: 194 W. 400 North, Manti, Utah
- Coordinates: 39°16′17″N 111°38′26″W
- Area: 1.0 acre (0.40 ha)
- Built: 1866, 1895
- Architectural style: Greek Revival, Victorian Eclectic
- NRHP reference No.: 14000864
- Added to NRHP: October 15, 2014

The Ezra and Abigail Shomaker House, at 194 W. 400 North in Manti, Utah, was listed on the National Register of Historic Places in 2014.

It is a one-and-a-half-story stone and brick house with Greek Revival and Victorian Eclectic style. It was built in three phases between 1866 and 1895.

It is also known as the Orlondo & Chelnishcia Shomaker House.
