= Ole Arilsen House =

- U.S. National Register of Historic Places
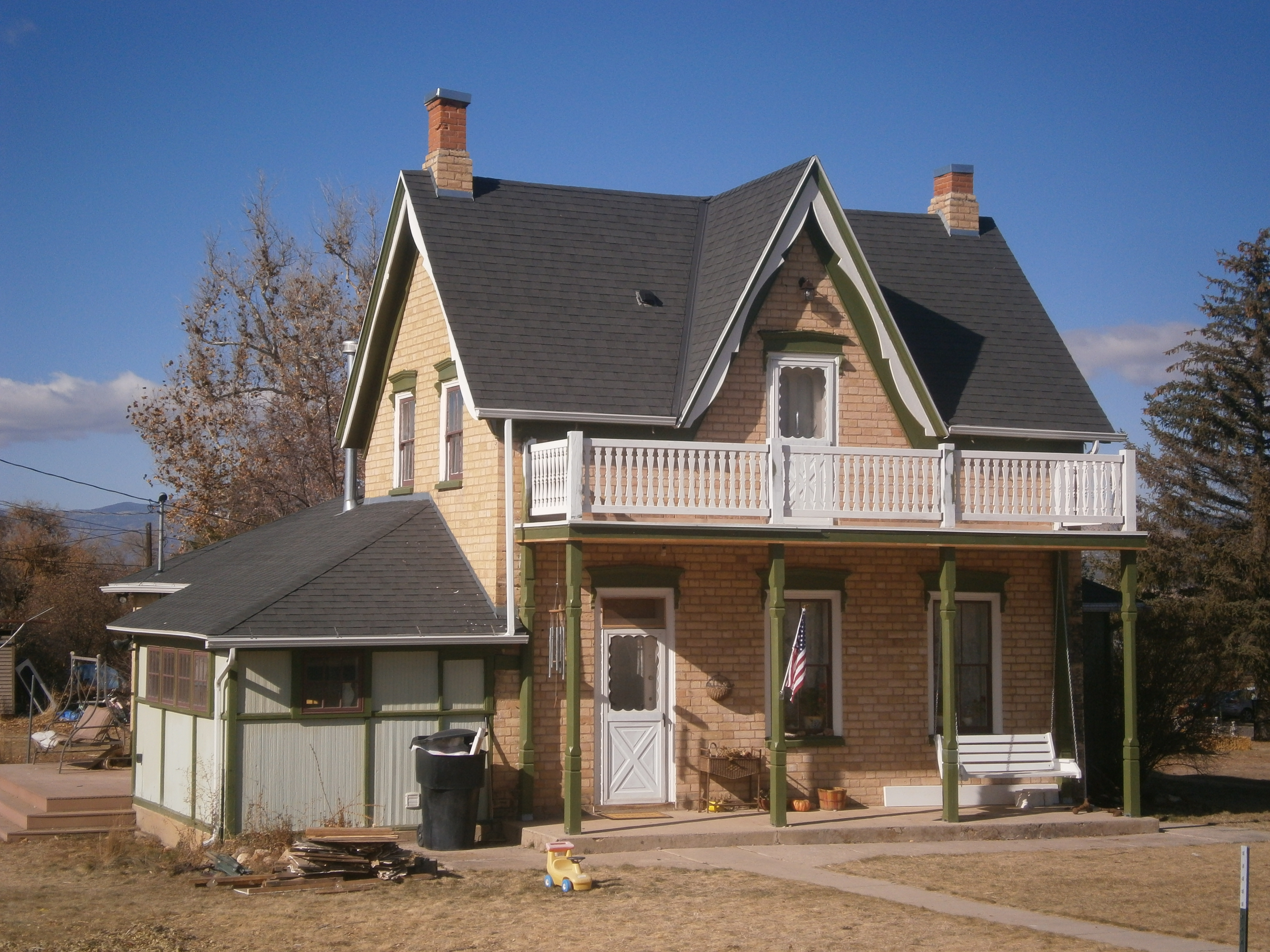

- Location within Utah Location within the United States
- Location: 89 N. 300 East, Mount Pleasant, Utah
- Coordinates: 39.547809°N 111.450078°W
- Area: less than one acre
- Built: c.1880
- NRHP reference No.: 80003953
- Added to NRHP: October 3, 1980

The Ole Arilsen House, at 89 N. 300 East off Utah State Route 116 in Mount Pleasant, Utah, was built in 1877. It was listed on the National Register of Historic Places in 1980.

It was built by Ole Arilsen (born 1849 in Denmark), whose family immigrated to Utah in 1862. The brick house is a good example of folk vernacular architecture of the "2/3 central passageway plan" type, with excellent brickwork.
