= Ephraim Relief Society Granary =

- U.S. National Register of Historic Places
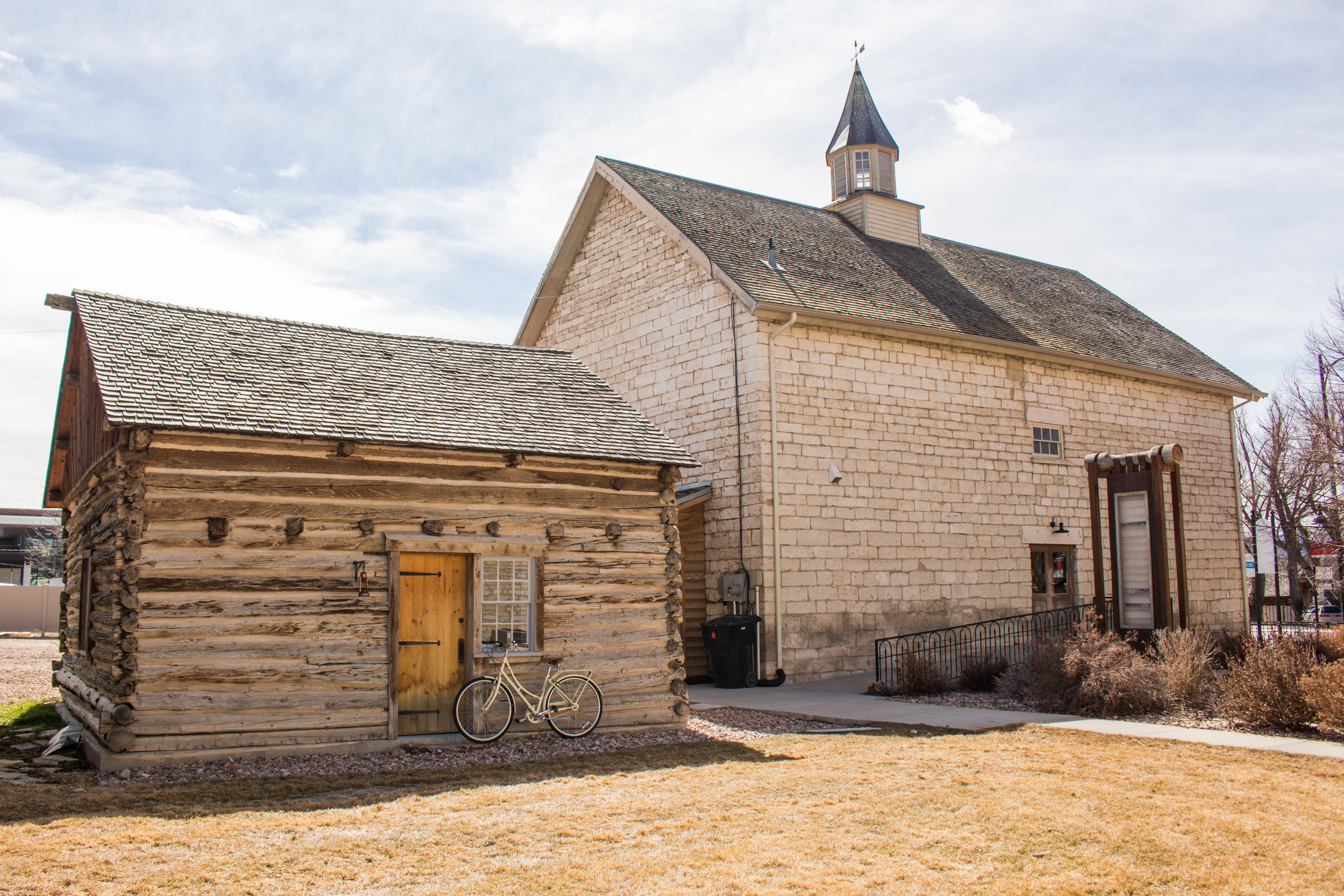

- Location within Utah Location within the United States
- Location: 86 N. Main St., Ephraim, Utah
- Coordinates: 39.361129°N 111.586817°W
- NRHP reference No.: 100004481
- Added to NRHP: September 30, 2019

The Ephraim Relief Society Granary is a two-story stone granary located at 86 N. Main St. Ephraim, Utah which was listed on the National Register of Historic Places in 2019.

It is a Relief Society building which was built in the 1870s.

It is a two-story stone building, about 30 by 50 feet (9.1 m × 15.2 m) in plan. It faces west onto Main St. in Ephraim. It was rehabilitated in 1991.

It is home of "Granary Arts", an art gallery and community education space.
