= Manti Presbyterian Church =

Historic church in Utah, United States

- U.S. National Register of Historic Places
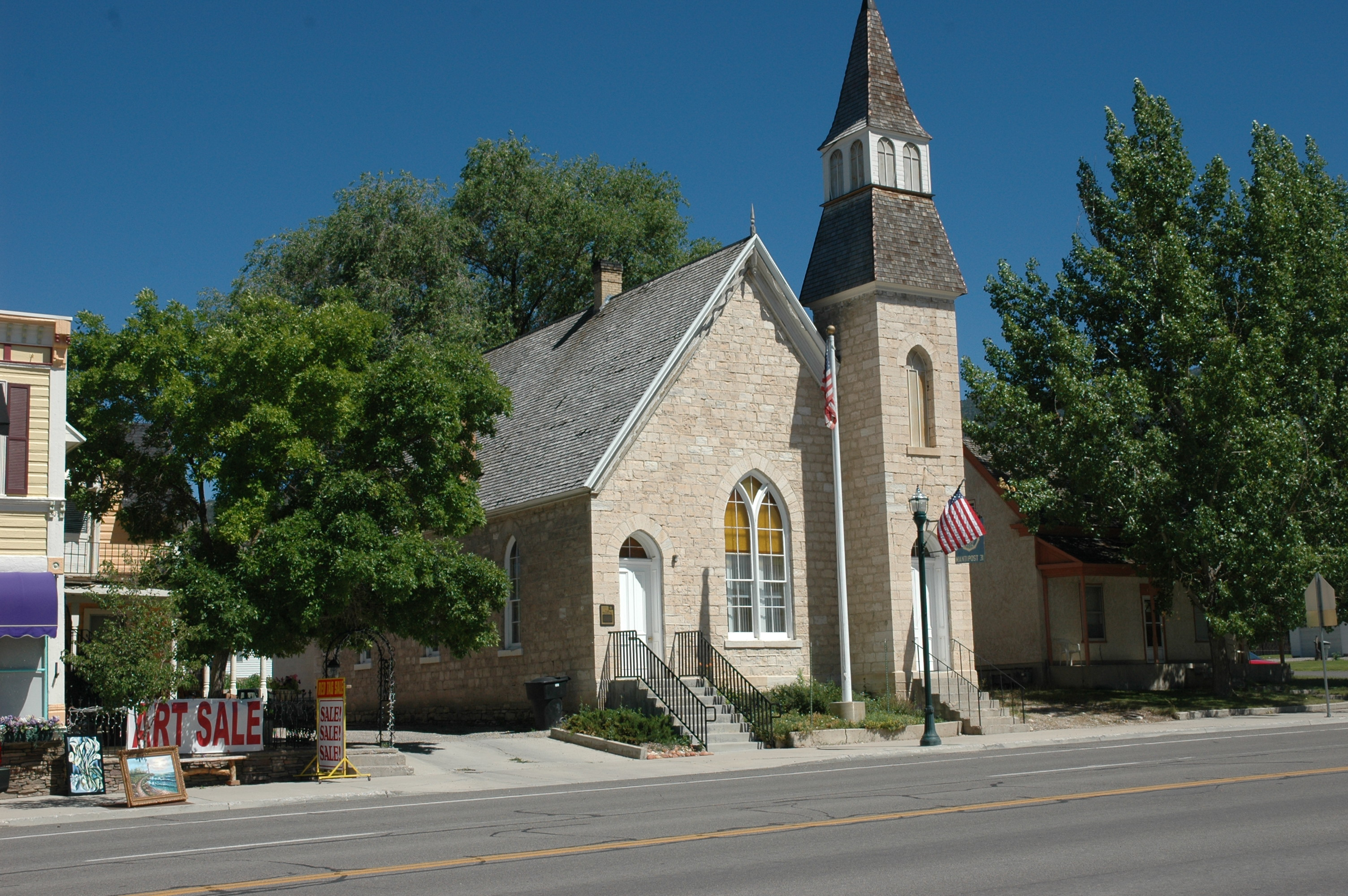

- Location within Utah Location within the United States
- Location: 185 S. Main St., Manti, Utah
- Coordinates: 39°15′46″N 111°38′12″W
- Area: less than one acre
- Built: 1881
- Built by: Jenson Brothers
- Architect: Peter Van Houghton
- Architectural style: Gothic Revival
- NRHP reference No.: 80003951
- Added to NRHP: March 27, 1980

The Manti Presbyterian Church is a historic church at 185 S. Main St. in Manti, Utah. The Gothic Revival building was constructed in 1881 and added to the National Register of Historic Places in 1980.

The church was designed by Salt Lake City architect Peter Van Houghton at no charge. It is a tall one-story building made of oolite stone. It has Gothic Revival details. It has a gable roof and a stone tower surmounted by a wooden belfry.
