= John Dorius Jr. House =

- U.S. National Register of Historic Places
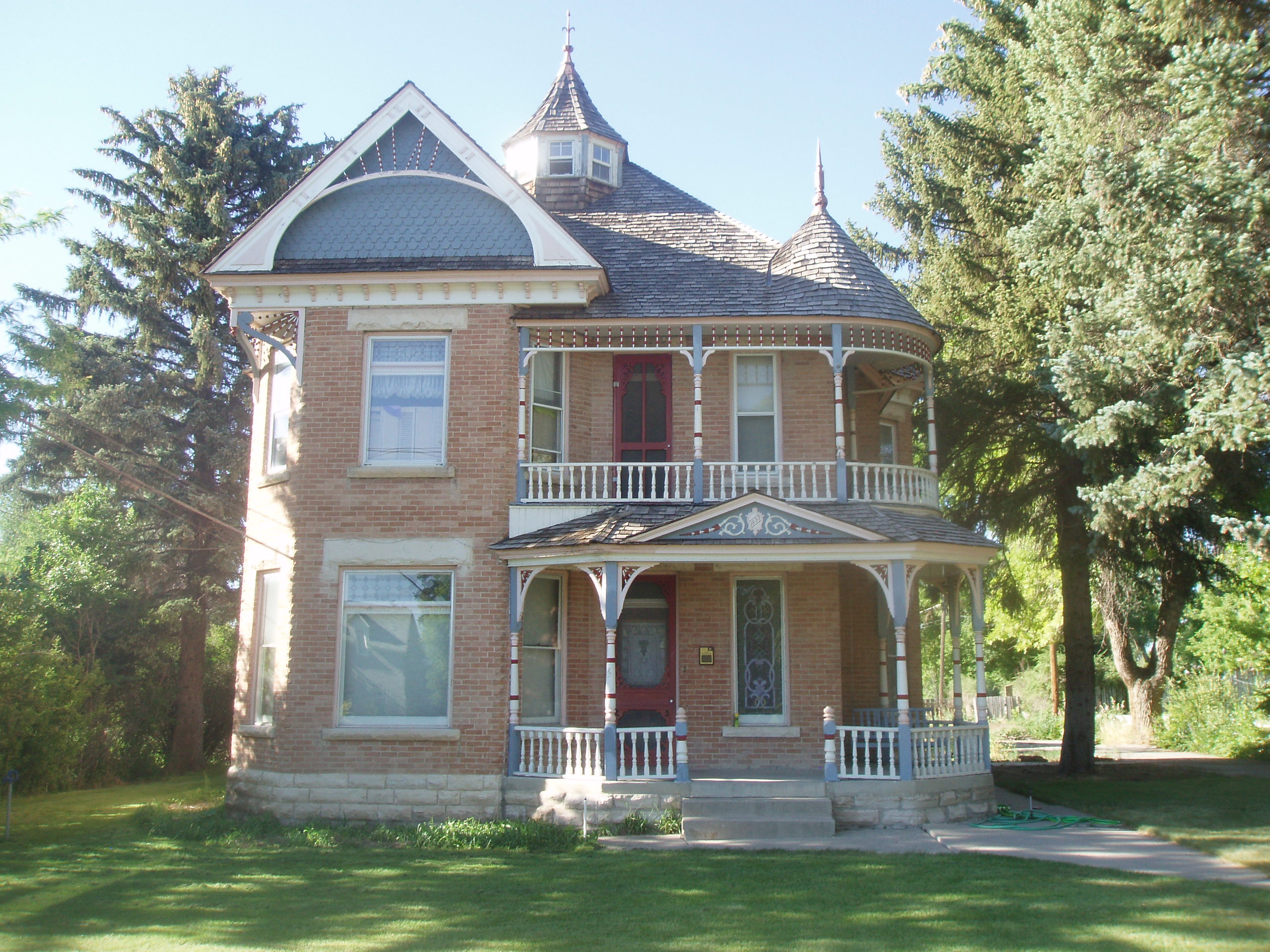

- Location within Utah Location within the United States
- Location: 46 W. 100 North, Ephraim, Utah
- Coordinates: 39.361906°N 111.588229°W
- Area: less than one acre
- Built: 1897
- Architectural style: Queen Anne
- NRHP reference No.: 85000964
- Added to NRHP: May 9, 1985

The John Dorius Jr. House, at 46 W. 100 North in Ephraim, Utah, is a Queen Anne-style house built in 1897. It was listed on the National Register of Historic Places in 1985.

It has a turret with a conical roof.

It was deemed "significant both for its fine Queen Anne architectural styling and its association with John Dorius, a prominent local businessman. In scale, massing, and decorative detail, the Dorius house is a noteworthy expression of Queen Anne design principles and remains one of the most outstanding examples of this important architectural style outside the major urban areas of Salt Lake City and Ogden."
