= Billings-Hougaard House =

- U.S. National Register of Historic Places
- Location within Utah
- Location: 75 E. 300 North, Manti, Utah
- Coordinates: 39.270034°N 111.635426°W
- Area: 1 acre (0.40 ha)
- Built: 1855
- Architectural style: Greek Revival, Utah folk/vernacular
- NRHP reference No.: 80003948
- Added to NRHP: October 14, 1980

The Billings-Hougaard House, at 75 E. 300 North, off U.S. Route 89 in Manti, Utah, was built around 1855. It was listed on the National Register of Historic Places in 1980.

It is a one-and-a-half-story folk/vernacular hall and parlor plan house, about 30 by 18 feet (9.1 m × 5.5 m) in plan. It has a rear T-extension. The house is built of high quality adobe bricks laid in common bond. It has Greek Revival style characteristics, in its proportions, its shallow pitch of roof, its half-height upper windows, and its cornice returns at gable ends.

It was deemed significant as "significant as an excellent example of Utah folk/vernacular design and because it is one of the best surviving unsheathed adobe homes in the state."

It was built by Alfred Billings and was bought in 1863 by Rasmus Hougaard (1806-1875), a wealthy arriving immigrant farmer from Virkel, Falster, Denmark.

It is located on the northwest corner of E. 300 North and N. 100 East.
