= W.D. Candland House =

- U.S. National Register of Historic Places
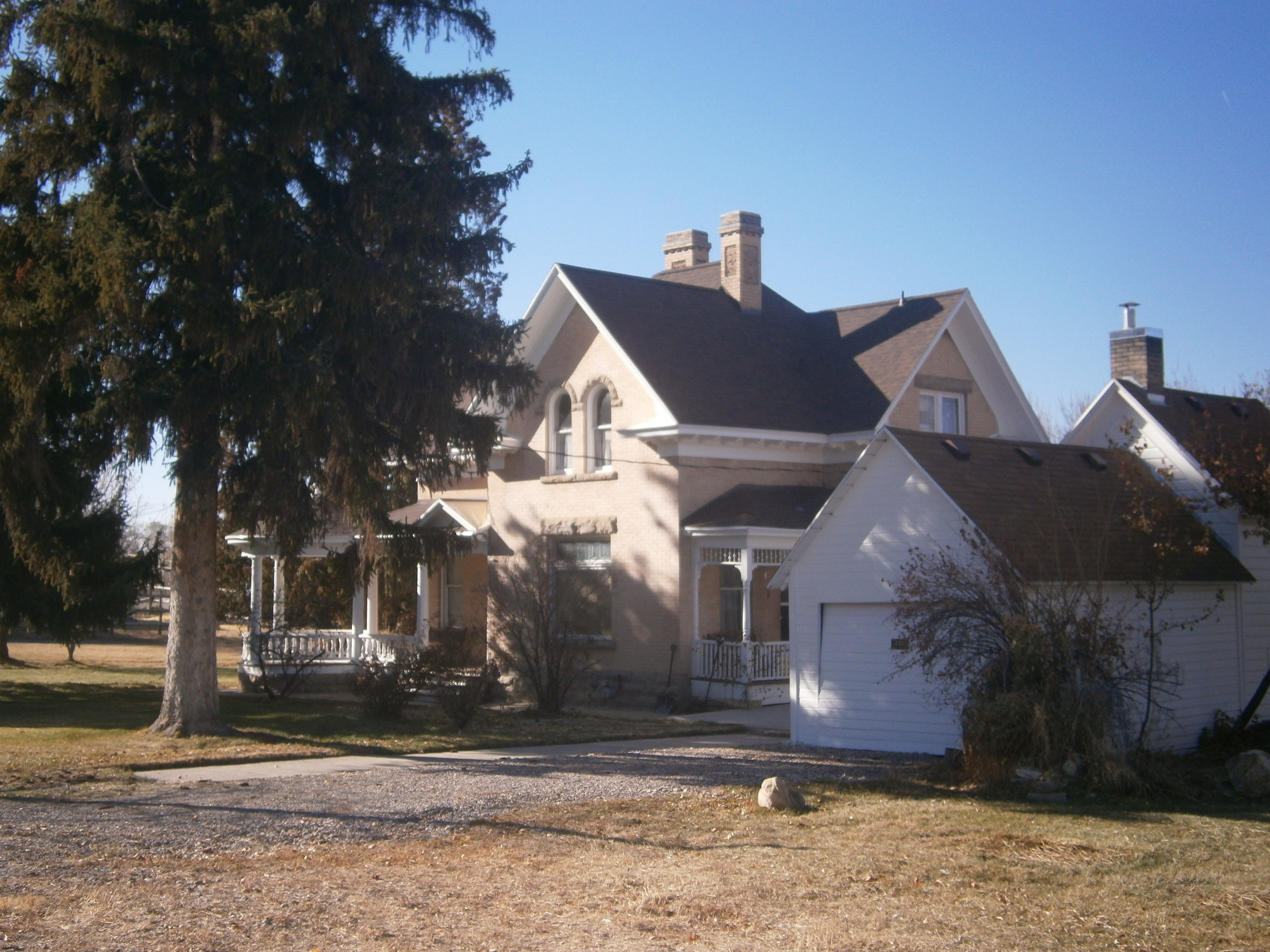

- Location within Utah Location within the United States
- Location: 123 North 100 West, Mount Pleasant, Utah
- Coordinates: 39.548531°N 111.457729°W
- Area: 1.06 acres
- Built: 1904; 122 years ago
- Architectural style: Victorian-Eclectic
- NRHP reference No.: 100004482
- Added to NRHP: September 30, 2019

The W.D. Candland House, at 123 North 100 West in Mount Pleasant, Utah, was completed in 1904. It was listed on the National Register of Historic Places in 2019.

The listing includes five contributing buildings and a contributing structure. The house is a brick 1 1/2-story, central-block-with-projecting-bays type Victorian Eclectic-style home.
