= Moroni Opera House =

- U.S. National Register of Historic Places
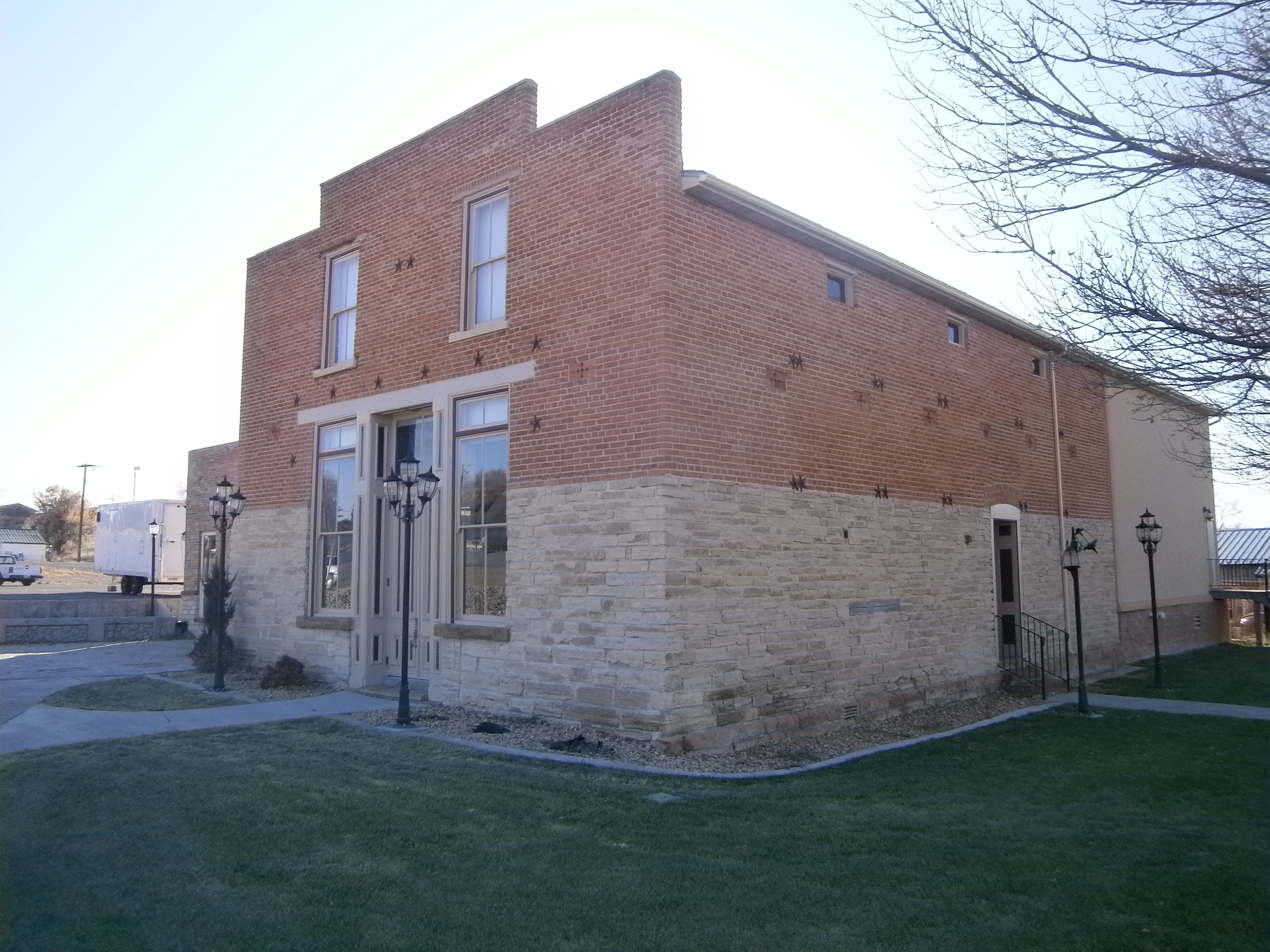

- Location within Utah Location within the United States
- Location: Jct. of UT 132 and W. Main St., Moroni, Utah
- Coordinates: 39.524743°N 111.590190°W
- Area: 0.2 acres (0.081 ha)
- Built: 1890-91
- Built by: Monson, Mons; Morley, T.J.
- Architectural style: Late 19th and 20th Century Revivals
- NRHP reference No.: 96000590
- Added to NRHP: May 23, 1996

The Moroni Opera House, at 325 W. Main St. in Moroni, Utah, was built in 1890–91. It was listed on the National Register of Historic Places in 1996.

It is a rectangular stone and brick building 51.6 by 35.25 feet (15.73 m × 10.74 m) in plan. The former wooden stage, which projected 32 feet (9.8 m) beyond, no longer remains.
