= Mortensen-Nelson House =

- U.S. National Register of Historic Places
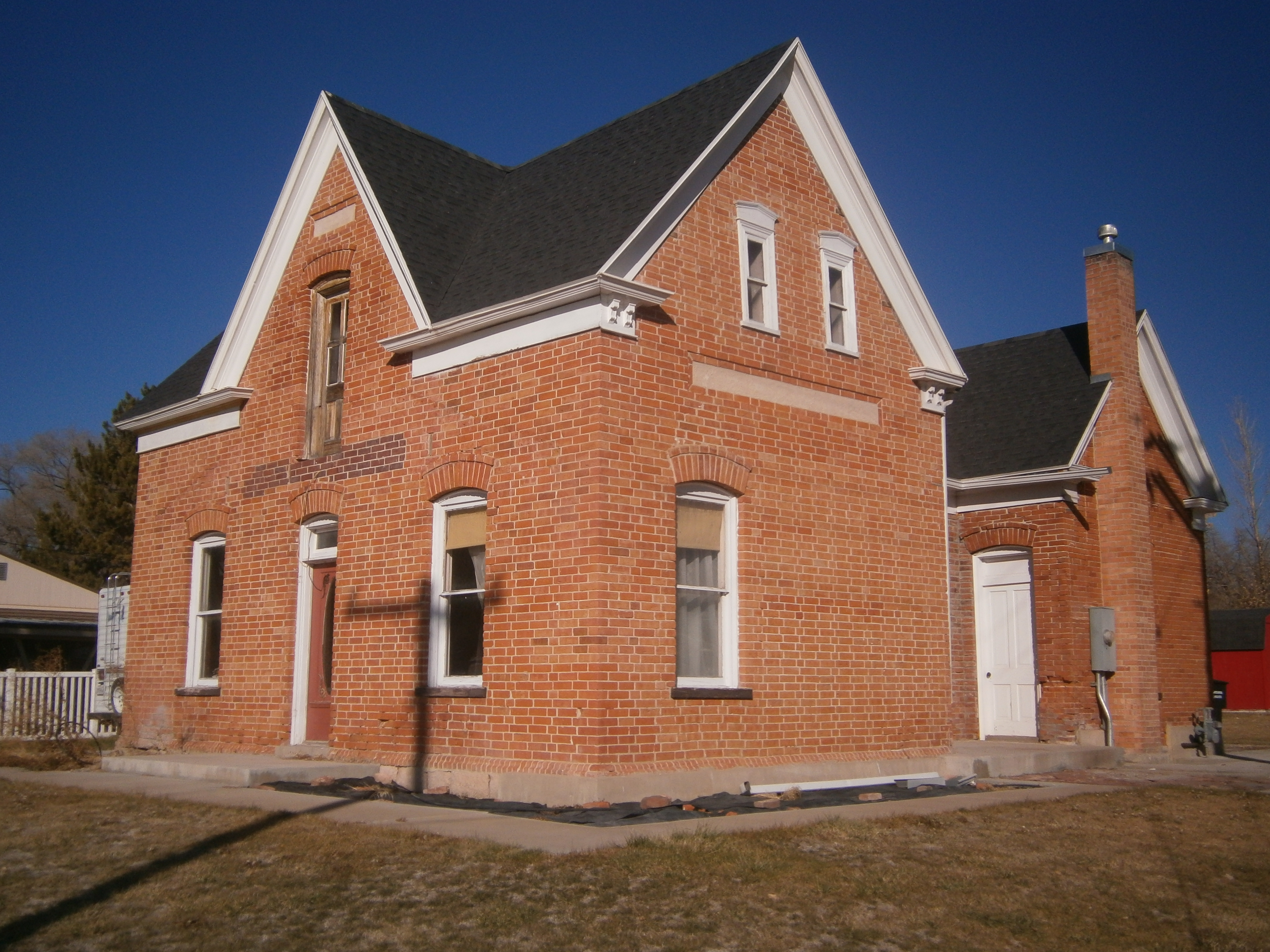

- Location within Utah Location within the United States
- Location: 291 East 100 South, Moroni, Utah
- Coordinates: 39.523726°N 111.578486°W
- Area: less than one acre
- Built: c.1885
- Architectural style: Late Victorian, Victorian Eclectic
- NRHP reference No.: 03000632
- Added to NRHP: July 10, 2003

The Mortensen-Nelson House, at 291 East 100 South in Moroni, Utah, USA, was built c.1885. It was listed on the National Register of Historic Places in 2003.

It is a one-and-a-half-story brick house upon a stone foundation, with a double cross-wing plan. It has paired decorative brackets. It was expanded c.1898.
