= Poulsen-Hall House =

- U.S. National Register of Historic Places
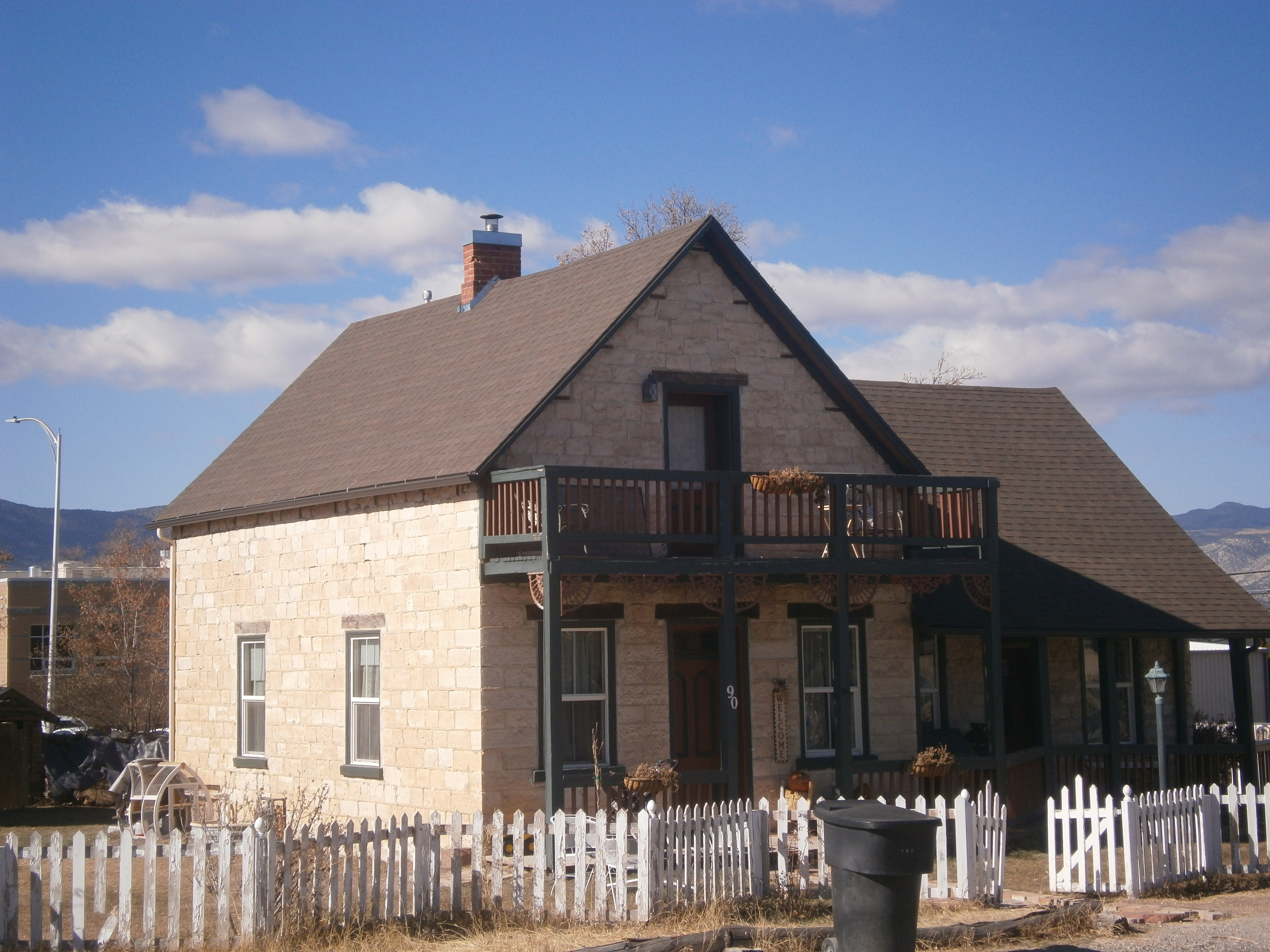

- Location within Utah Location within the United States
- Location: 90 S. 100 East, Manti, Utah
- Coordinates: 39°15′51″N 111°38′07″W
- Area: 0.4 acres (0.16 ha)
- Built: 1876
- Architectural style: Gothic, Greek Revival, Temple Form
- NRHP reference No.: 11000235
- Added to NRHP: April 27, 2011

The Poulsen-Hall House, at 90 S. 100 East in Manti, Utah, was built in 1876. It was listed on the National Register of Historic Places in 2011.

Architecture: Gothic, Greek Revival, Temple Form

It may also be known as the Niels C. & Jensene Poulsen House or the William T. & Dagmar P. Hall House.

The house has been available for vacation rental.
