= Fairview Amusement Hall =

- U.S. National Register of Historic Places
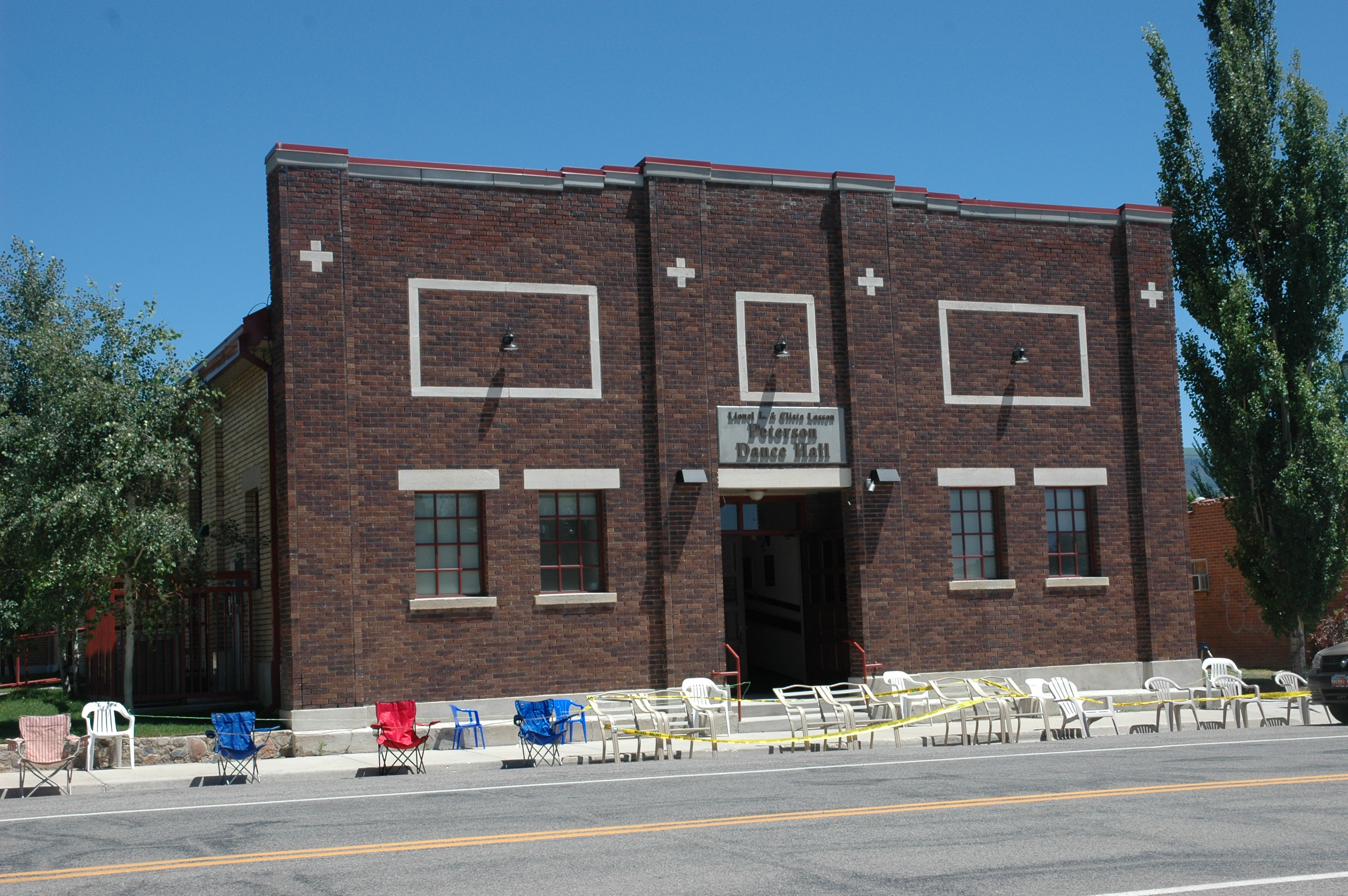

- Location within Utah Location within the United States
- Location: 75 S. State St., Fairview, Utah
- Coordinates: 39°37′38″N 111°26′18″W
- Area: less than one acre
- Built: 1927
- Built by: Allie Carlston, Oscan & Whit Amundsen
- Architectural style: Late 19th And Early 20th Century American Movements
- NRHP reference No.: 02000507
- Added to NRHP: May 10, 2002

The Fairview Amusement Hall, at 75 S. State St. in Fairview, Utah, was built in 1927. It was listed on the National Register of Historic Places in 2002.

It was built by building contractor Allie Carlston with Oscar Amundsen and his son Whit doing the brick work.
