= John R. Nielson Cabin =

- U.S. National Register of Historic Places
- Location within Utah Location within the United States
- Nearest city: Manti, Utah
- Coordinates: 39.266806°N 111.501103°W
- Area: less than one acre
- Built: 1948
- Built by: John R. Nielson
- Architectural style: rustic
- NRHP reference No.: 03000772
- Added to NRHP: June 8, 2004

The John R. Nielson Cabin, near Manti, Utah, was built in 1948. It was listed on the National Register of Historic Places in 2004.

It was built of aspen logs in Manti Canyon in Manti-La Sal National Forest, near Swen's Spring, about 9 miles (14 km) east of Manti. It is located at the end of short Forest Road 1232, a turnoff at Swen's Spring from Forest Road 0046 which comes up the Middle Fork of Manti Canyon, off Forest Road 0045 which comes up Manti Canyon from Manti.

It is the only surviving "isolated" cabin in Manti-La Sal National Forest; its isolation helped its survival. It was built as a hunting/recreational cabin by the family of John R. and Alice J. Nielson. It has been used by the family and also by many others.

The cabin was deemed architecturally significant "as a surviving example of the influence of the USFS design guidelines on rustic style cabin construction."

A Works Progress Administration-era outhouse, moved to the site in 1950, is a second contributing building in the listing.
