= Wales Co-operative Mercantile Institution =

- U.S. National Register of Historic Places
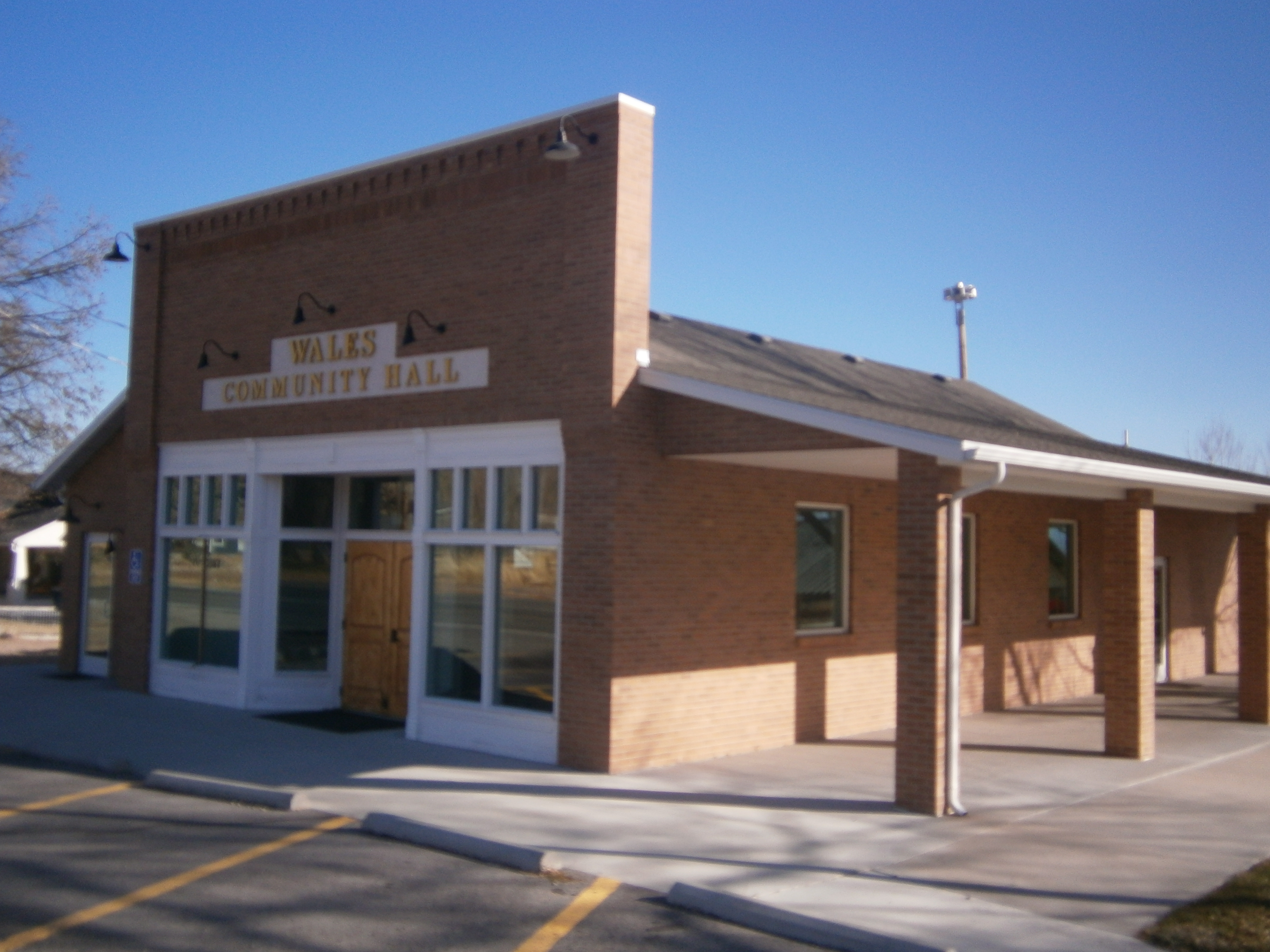

- Location within Utah Location within the United States
- Location: 150 N. State St., Wales, Utah
- Coordinates: 39.487579°N 111.634862°W
- Area: 0.3 acres (0.12 ha)
- Built: 1894
- Architectural style: Late Victorian
- NRHP reference No.: 00001176
- Added to NRHP: September 29, 2000

The Wales Co-operative Mercantile Institution, at 150 N. State St. in Wales, Utah, was built in 1894. It was listed on the National Register of Historic Places in 2000.

It is a one-story Western false-front-style building.

It may also be known as Wales Commercial Mercantile.
