= Centerfield School and Meetinghouse =

- U.S. National Register of Historic Places
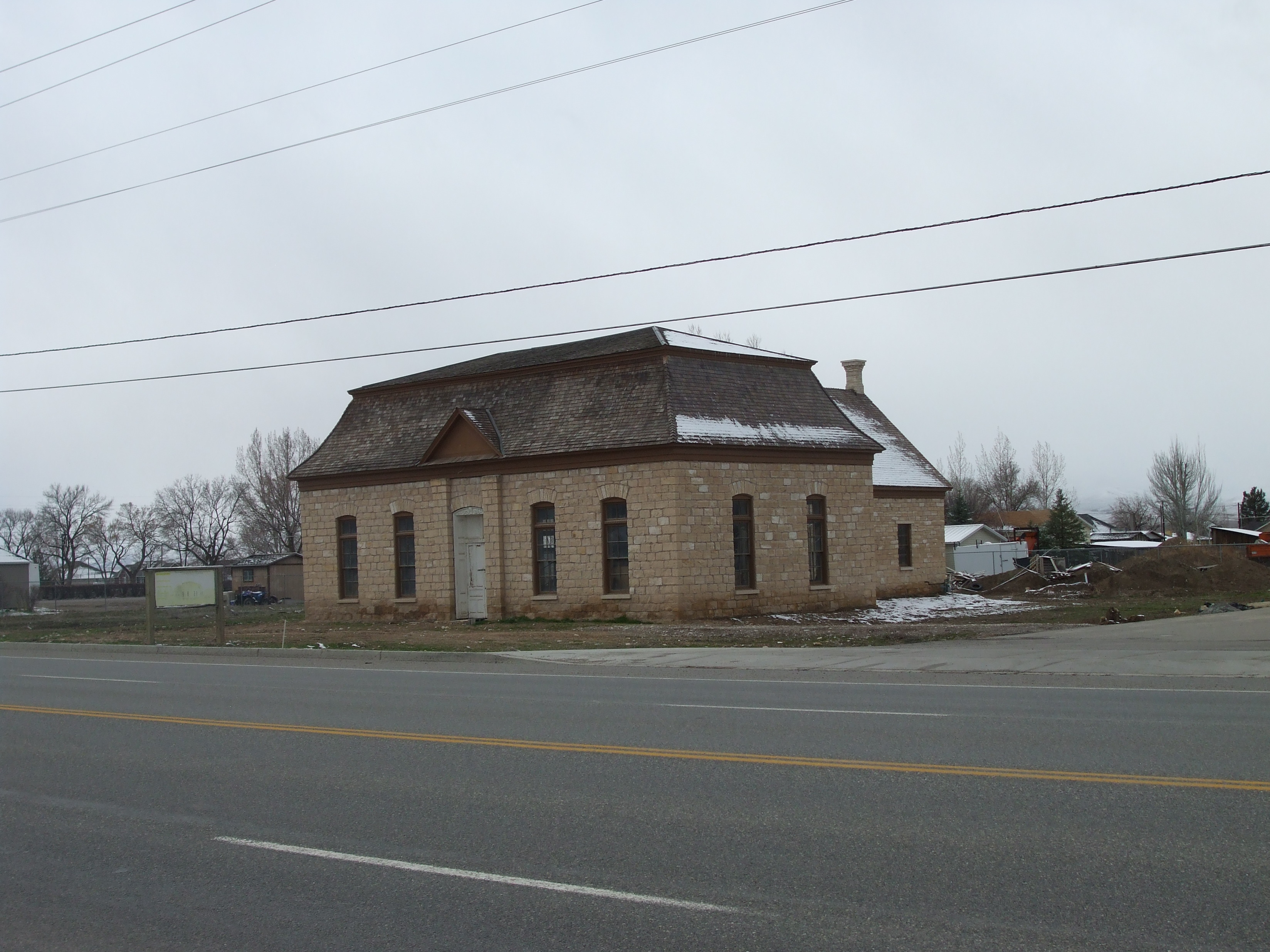

- Location within Utah Location within the United States
- Location: 140 S. Main St., Centerfield, Utah
- Coordinates: 39.123623°N 111.819710°W
- Area: 0.5 acres (0.20 ha)
- Built: c.1886-87
- Built by: Chris Tollstrup, Gustav Nielsen
- Architectural style: Second Empire
- MPS: Mormon Church Buildings in Utah MPS
- NRHP reference No.: 00001068
- Added to NRHP: September 12, 2000

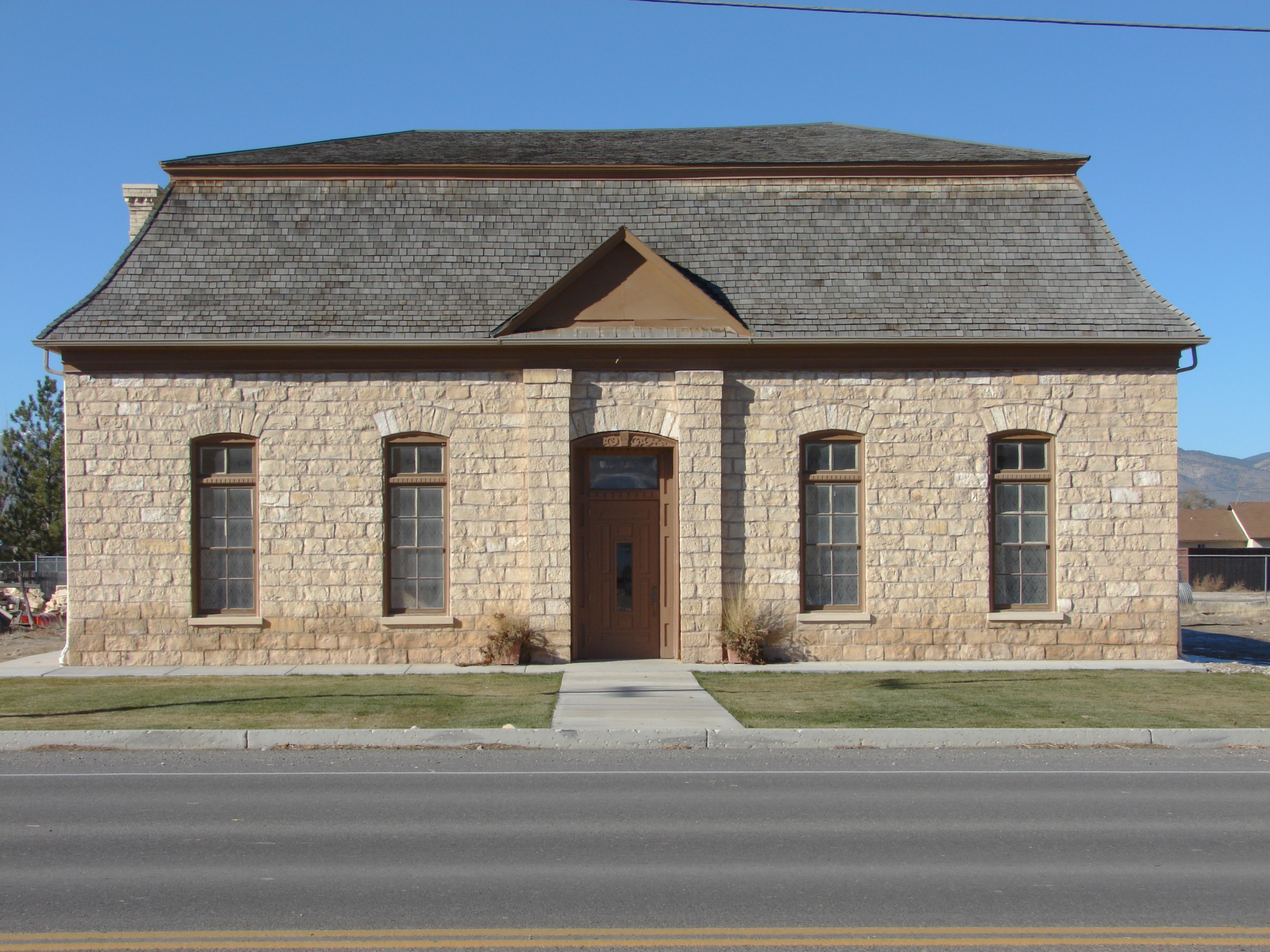
2015

The Centerfield School and Meetinghouse, also known as the Centerfield Rock Church, is a historic structure located at 140 S. Main St. in Centerfield, Utah. Built between 1886 and 1889, it was listed on the National Register of Historic Places in 2000.

It is a one-story oolitic limestone building, built by stonemasons Chris Tollstrup and Gustav Nielsen. A mansard roof on the east portion of the building was added in 1897 to give it Second Empire style.
