= Robert Johnson House =

- U.S. National Register of Historic Places
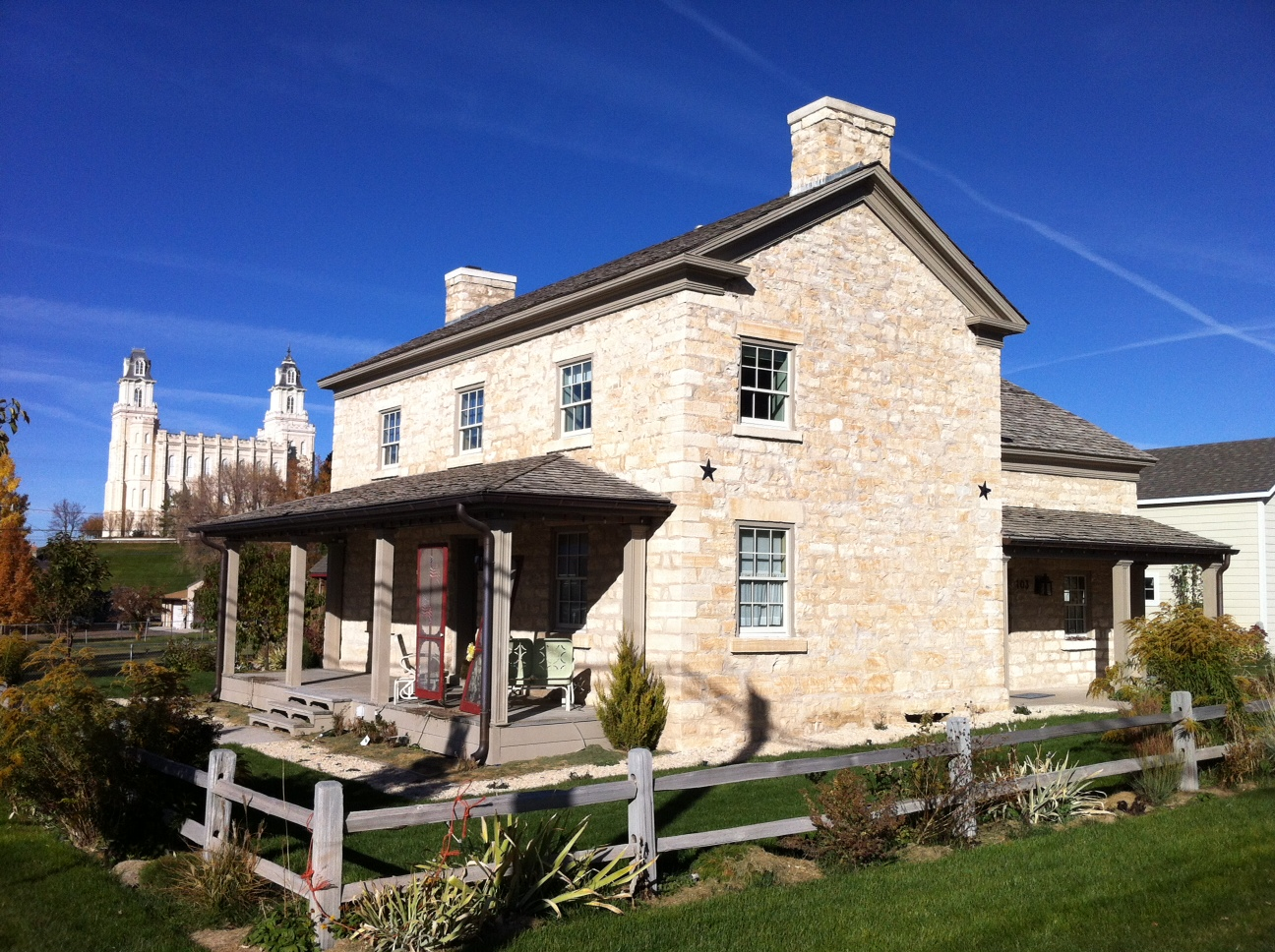
- The house in 2011

- Location within Utah Location within the United States
- Location: Off U.S. 89, Manti, Utah
- Coordinates: 39°16′13″N 111°38′02″W
- Area: less than one acre
- Built: 1860
- Built by: Robert Johnson
- Architectural style: Sanpete domestic vernacular
- NRHP reference No.: 80003949
- Added to NRHP: October 14, 1980

The Robert Johnson House is a historic two-story house in Manti, Utah. It was built with limestone in 1860 by Robert Johnson, an immigrant from England who converted to the Church of Jesus Christ of Latter-day Saints and settled in Utah in 1853. He became a prosperous farmer in Manti. The house has been listed on the National Register of Historic Places since October 14, 1980.
