= Larsen House =

Larsen House may refer to:

in Denmark

- Carpenter Larsen's house, a historic house at Nymindegab Museum, in Varde Municipality

in the United States

- Larsen Family House, Willits, California, NRHP-listed in Mendocino County
- Larsen Fish Cabin at Captiva Rocks, Bokeelia, Florida, NRHP-listed
- Archie Larsen House, Weiser, Idaho, NRHP-listed in Washington County
- Chris Larsen House, Elk Horn, Iowa, NRHP-listed in Shelby County
- Aage and Kristine Larsen Homestead, Dagmar, Montana, NRHP-listed in Montana
- Erickson-Larsen Ensemble, Astoria, Oregon, NRHP-listed in Clatsop County
- Smith-Larsen House, Centerville, Utah, NRHP-listed in Davis County
- Oluf Larsen House, Ephraim, Utah, NRHP-listed in Sanpete County
- Larsen-Noyes House, Ephraim, Utah, NRHP-listed in Sanpete County
- Jens T. Larsen House, Kimballton, Iowa, NRHP-listed in Audubon County
- Watkins-Tholman-Larsen Farmstead, Mt. Pleasant, Utah, NRHP-listed in Sanpete County
- Christen Larsen House, Pleasant Grove, Utah, NRHP-listed in Utah County
- Neils Peter Larsen House, Pleasant Grove, Utah, NRHP-listed in Utah County
- Erick Lehi and Ingrid Larsen Olson House, River Heights, Utah, NRHP-listed in Cache County
