= Pair-house =

Type of house built by Scandinavian immigrants in the US

A pair-house is a three-room house found in the US built in the 19th century by Scandinavian immigrants as an adaptation of common houses from their homeland. Commonly found in the US state of Utah, pair-houses are historically significant as being representative of ethnic diversity in an area and time that favored uniformity among followers of the Church of Jesus Christ of Latter-day Saints (LDS Church). A number of pair-houses are listed on the National Register of Historic Places.

== Background ==
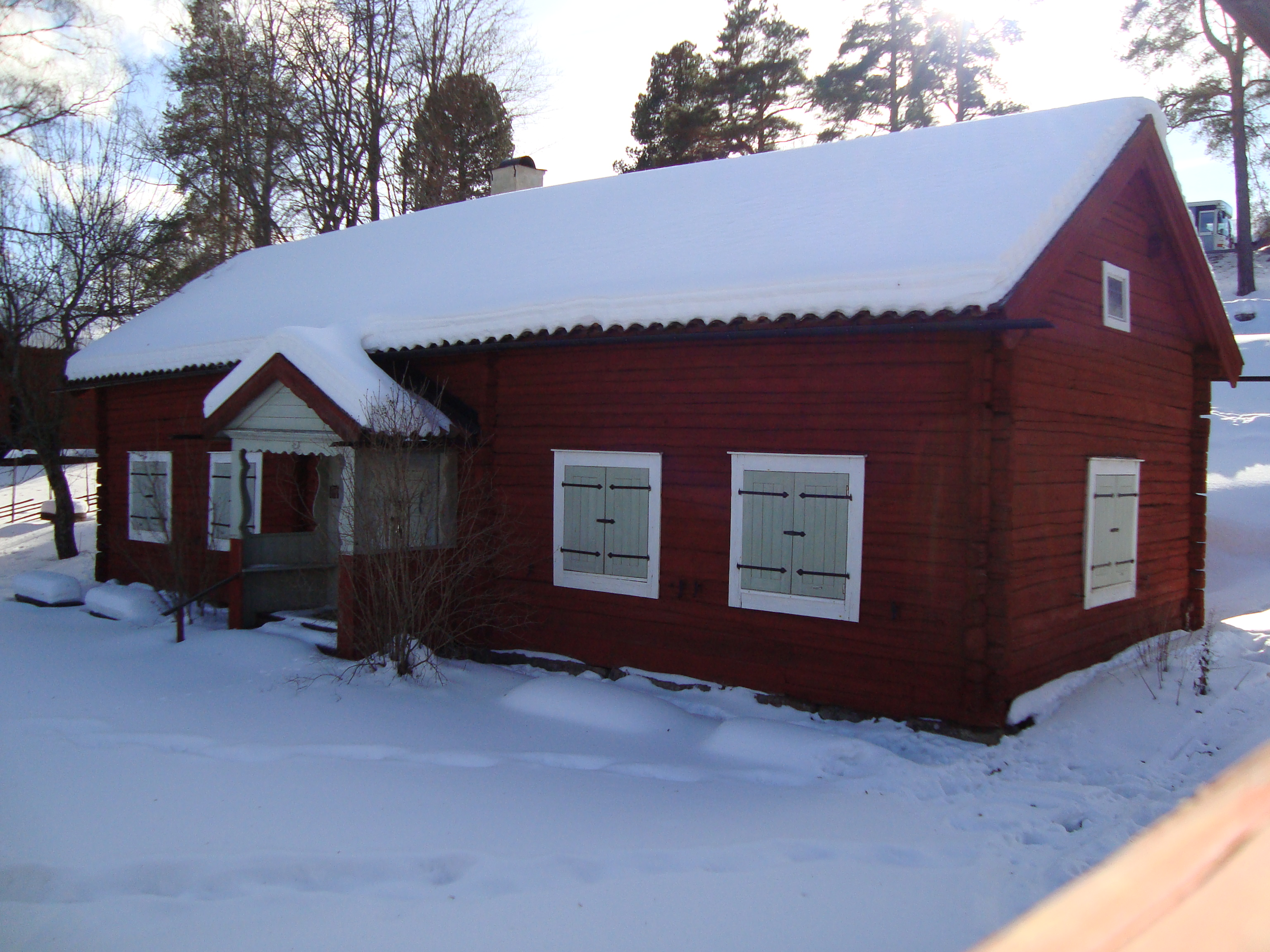
A parstuga in Hedemora, Sweden

Pair-houses are an architectural style of house based on Scandinavian tradition and most often found in early Mormon settlements in the central part of Utah. The house is defined by the existence of three nearly equal sized rooms arranged side by side with access to the outer two rooms from the main center room, which contained a central entrance door on the front and also access from the rear. The front side would usually have windows on both sides of the front door, and an additional window in each end room. A gable roof runs the length of the structure.

The Fredrick Christian Sorensen House in Ephraim, Utah, built around 1850 by Danish immigrant Fredrick Christian Sorensen, is an early example of an adobe pair-house with a roof of log purlins and sawn rafters. There are many other pair-houses built by Scandinavian immigrants in Ephraim and throughout Sanpete County.

The name is a translation of the Swedish parstuga which literally means "pair-cottage", indicating a center room with a pair of flanking rooms. While a Swedish parstuga also has three linear rooms, the center room is narrower than the end rooms and is used as the entry and kitchen. The central room in a pair-house is the main living space in the house. The name is attributed to Swedish scholar Sigurd Erixon of the Stockholm University. The Danish name tvillinghuser means "twin-house" and in Norway, it is the dobblethus or "double house". The central-passage house originating in colonial America also has a linear three-room design, but is distinct because the center room was narrow and used only as a passageway. The name for the house in Finnish (part of Sweden until 1809) is "paritupa", and is derived from the Swedish, though "tupa" can mean both "cottage" and "room" (literally "pair of rooms").

The pair-house has also been characterized as a scaled-down Danish Herregård (farmhouse).

== Origin ==
The design dates to the 16th century in central and northern Sweden and central and western Norway where it remained the main dwelling on larger farms into the 19th-century. Its use expanded to Denmark by the end of the 18th century, becoming common there over the next half-century. It was first an upper-class home but gradually became a common rural farmhouse for the middle-class farms and a symbol of economic progress from peasantry.

Rectangular three-room dwellings with a center entrance were not unique to Scandinavia. The German Ernhaus had a central room used as a kitchen, flanked by a living area and a stable. Similar three-room structures with a central kitchen room were constructed in France, and spread from western Europe to southwestern Russia where they were introduced by German-Russian settlers, and throughout northern and eastern Europe. Elongated three-room houses are found throughout the Baltic Sea region including the Scandinavian countries, Finland, Russia, Poland, and Germany.

== US distribution ==
Most documented pair-houses are found in Utah, but can be found elsewhere. Danish immigrants in the Great Plains primarily adopted popular American architectural styles, they also built pair-houses with neoclassical facades during the 1870s and 1880s. As in Utah, they represented economic achievement and ethnic identity.

One-story, gable roofed, three room dwellings were built by German-Russians in Emmons County, North Dakota. The style has also been called the "Baltic three-room house" by some. Pair-houses have also been identified in Arizona and Idaho.

== Historical significance ==
- Scandinavian-American Pair-house Thematic Group
- U.S. National Register of Historic Places
- Location within Utah Location within the United States
- Location: central Utah, (Sanpete, Sevier, Millard, and Salt Lake counties)
- Coordinates: 39°21′29″N 111°35′2″W
- Built: c.1860-1880
- NRHP reference No.: 64000873

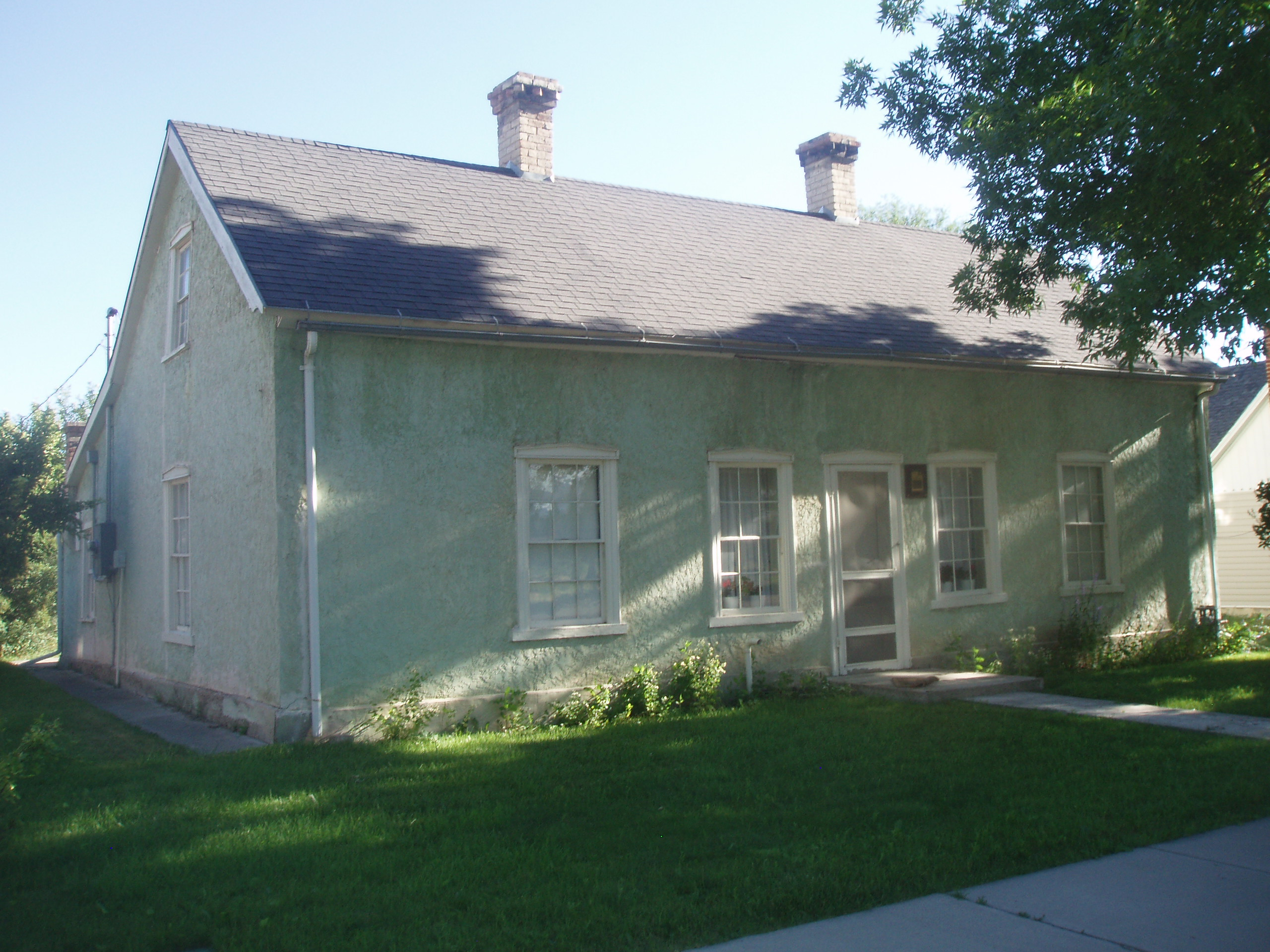
The Fredrick C. Sorensen House in Ephraim, a Type II pair house with window-door-window cluster at center room. Note pair of internal chimneys piercing roof ridge.

While some pair-houses are individually listed on the National Register of Historic Places (NRHP), a collection of such houses in Utah, nonadjacent and disconnected, have been documented as the Scandinavian-American Pair-house Thematic Group. These houses span four Utah counties and represent the "multi-cultural nature of early Mormon society".

They make up some of the oldest houses in Utah and few exist today that have not been significantly altered or deteriorated. Scandinavian immigrants in Utah, many of whom previously lived as peasants, were able to own land and build what they considered a middle-class style house, differing both from other types of local architecture, usually based on English styles, and their prior peasant dwellings.

Utah pair-houses, while all having the deterministic three-room layout, differed in ways such as window and chimney placement, dimension, and material.

While found throughout Utah, pair-houses are most common in "Little Scandinavia", the Sanpete-Sevier county area, where the Scandinavian immigrants were the most concentrated. Over 90% of Utah's recorded pair-house examples are located there.

Over 20,000 Scandinavians emigrated to Utah in the 19th-century where the Mormon theocracy discouraged "retention of Old World values and customs" in an attempt to build a homogeneous church following. The pair-house demonstrates that some level of ethnic diversity was tolerated.

Several pair-houses are known to have been built for or are otherwise associated with Anglo-American Mormons demonstrating popularity and practicality with non-Scandinavians.

=== Individual houses ===
The following pair-houses were identified by the Utah State Historical Society and submitted to the National Park Service/Heritage Conservation and Recreation Service for listing on the NRHP. Most were eventually listed individually; two are included in a listed historic district and three were removed from consideration at the request of the owners. Approximately thirty others were identified in the nomination but not considered worthy of listing/preservation due to significant deterioration, alteration, or demolition.

Name	Approximate year built	Location	Individually NRHP Listed	Notes
Claus Peter Andersen House	1865	Ephraim	1983	
Lars S. Andersen House	1870	Ephraim	1983	Three-room Type II, unusual for its 2-2-2 openings rather than 1-3-1.
Andrew Barentsen House	1875	Fountain Green	1983	
Peter Hansen House	1880	Manti	1983	
Anders Hintze House	1865	Salt Lake City	1983	
Jacobsen-Jensen House	1875	Ephraim	nom 1981	nomination withdrawn at owner request
Hans C. Jensen House	1870	Ephraim	1983	
Jens Jensen House	1865	Spring City	1980	within Spring City Historic District, demolished 1982
Rasmus Jensen House	1870	Ephraim	1983	
Martin Johnson House	1880	Glenwood	1982	
Peter Axel Johnson House	1876	Monroe	1983	
Christen Larsen House	1876	Pleasant Grove	1987	
Oluf Larsen House	1870	Ephraim	1983	
Hans Ottesen House	1870	Manti	1987	
Peter Honson House	1875	Spring City	1980	within Spring City Historic District
Niels Mortensen House	1875	Ephraim	nom 1981	nomination withdrawn at owner request
Jens C. Nielsen House	1870	Ephraim	1983	
Andrew Petersen House	1875	Richfield	nom 1981	nomination withdrawn at owner request
Soren Simonsen House	1880	Monroe	1982	
Dykes Sorensen House	1870	Ephraim	1982	
Fredrick C. Sorensen House	1870	Ephraim	1980	
Thuesen-Petersen House	1870	Scipio	1983	

Also, the Annie Birch House, near Hoytsville, Utah, was built around 1875.

== Categories ==
The Utah State Historical Society, in its NRHP study/submission identified four major categories or variations of pair-houses. Some types also have more minor variations. These four main types are:

=== Type I ===
Type I houses are the most similar to the oldest pair-houses in Norway and Sweden, with the central room proportioned about two-thirds the size of the outer square rooms. The center room has a door and the end rooms are symmetrical with one or two windows. The center room is 12–13 feet (3.7–4.0 m) wide, double the 6–7-foot (1.8–2.1 m) width of the central-passage house's middle passageway.

=== Type II ===
Type II houses are the most common in Utah and feature a center room larger than the end rooms. The main room is either a square with the end rooms three-quarters or two-thirds its size, or a slightly larger rectangle with square end rooms. This type normally has windows on the side of the entry door, creating a window-door-window cluster, and a single window in each end room.

=== Type III ===
Type III houses are similar to Type II; however, the window and doors are spaced evenly along the facade, requiring adjustments to the internal symmetry of the rooms.

=== Type IV ===
In this type all three rooms are square, but the center room is smaller and aligned in the back creating a recessed porch in the front. The center room may have the normal window-door-window configuration or just a window-door due to the smaller size. The end rooms each have either one or two windows.
