= Samuel Hoyt =

Samuel Hoyt may refer to:

- Samuel Hoyt Elbert (1907–1997), American linguist
- Samuel Hoyt Venable (1852–1905), American businessman
- Samuel Pierce Hoyt (1807–1889), American merchant and farmer

== See also ==
- Samuel P. Hoyt House, mansion house of Samuel Pierce Hoyt
- Sam Hoyt (born 1962), American politician
