= Dykes Sorensen House =

- U.S. National Register of Historic Places
- Location within Utah Location within the United States
- Location: 2nd East St., Ephraim, Utah
- Coordinates: 39.354251°N 111.582177°W
- Area: 0.4 acres (0.16 ha)
- Built: c.1865–1875
- MPS: Scandinavian-American Pair-houses TR
- NRHP reference No.: 82001756
- Added to NRHP: October 20, 1982

The Dykes Sorensen House, at 2nd East St. in Ephraim, Utah, is a pair-house built around 1865–1875. It was listed on the National Register of Historic Places in 1982.

The house was deemed "architecturally significant as an example of Scandinavian folk building design in Utah." It is a one-story adobe house which is a modified version of a pair-house (usually three rooms wide). Its plan and its facade's fenestration is consistent with the pair-house style, although this was only built two rooms wide; perhaps Sorensen had intended to complete it out as a full pair-house later. It is termed a "Type IV" pair-house, and has an indented porch in what would be its center section (if the third room was added to the south end).

Dykes Sorensen was a Danish farmer about whom not much is known; he obtained the deed for this property in 1871.

It is located at 302 S. 200 East in Ephraim. It faces east, and its property is located on the southwest corner of E. 300 South and S. 200 East.
