= Hans C. Jensen House =

- U.S. National Register of Historic Places
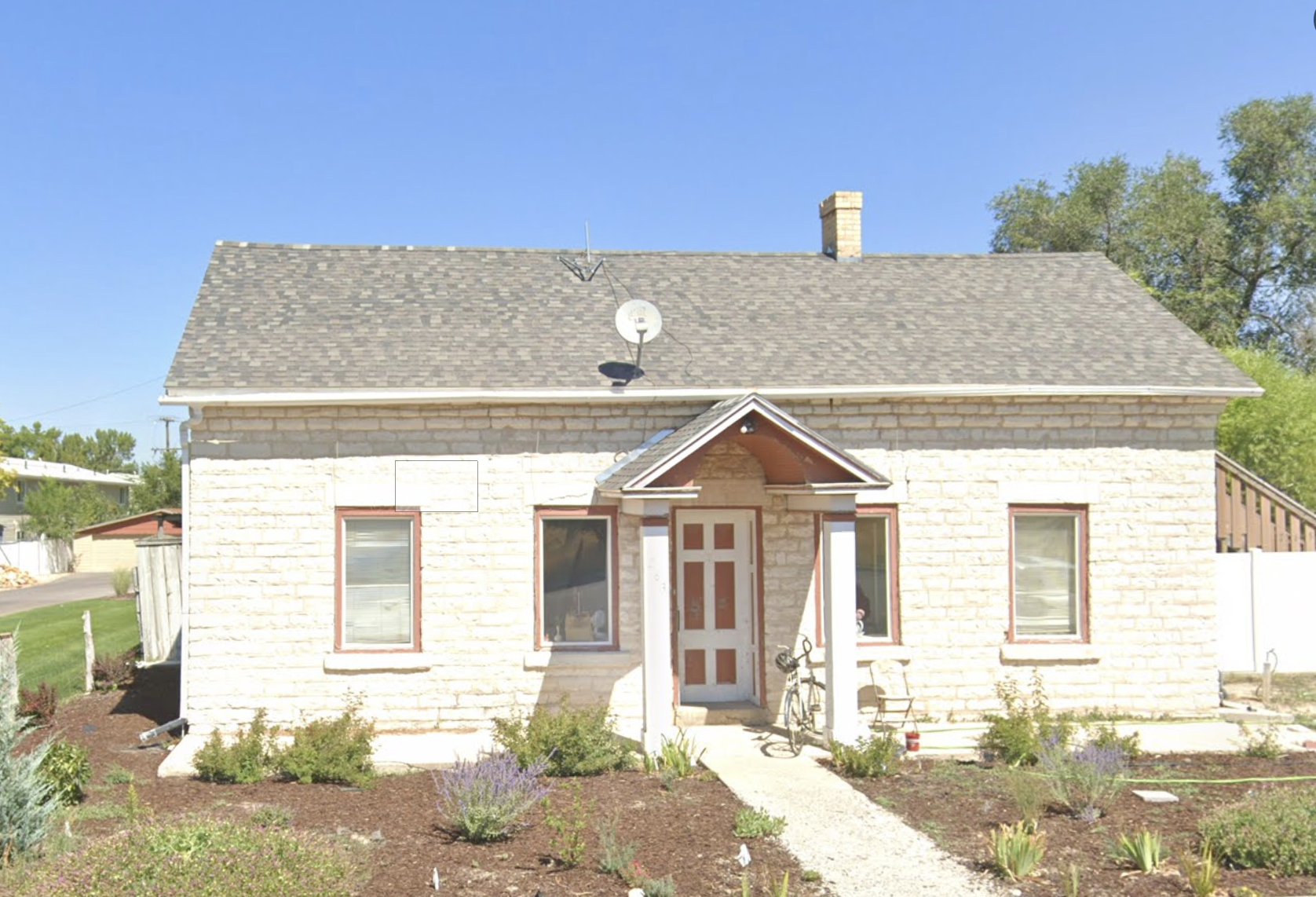
- Hans C. Jensen House in 1998

- Location within Utah Location within the United States
- Location: 263 E. 100 South; Ephraim, Utah
- Coordinates: 39°21′31″N 111°34′46″W
- Area: less than one acre
- Built: c.1870
- MPS: Scandinavian-American Pair-houses TR
- NRHP reference No.: 83003188
- Added to NRHP: February 1, 1983

The Hans C. Jensen House, at 263 E. 100 South in Ephraim, Utah, is a historic pair-house built around 1870. It was listed on the National Register of Historic Places in 1983.

It was deemed "significant as an example of Scandinavian vernacular architecture in Utah." It is a one-and-a-half-story limestone pair-house, of the subtype having a two-room deep plan. It has paired internal stove chimneys. A bungalow-style portico is a later addition.

It was home of Hans C. Jensen, born in 1845 in Housenge, Denmark. He joined the Church of Jesus Christ of Latter-day Saints in the 1860s and immigrated to Utah in 1866, settling in Ephraim. He was a farmer who also "served on the city council, and was active in the local Danish ward meeting."

The house is south-facing. By 2009, the western one of the pair of roof-piercing chimneys was no longer present.
