= Jens Nielsen House =

Historic pair-house in Ephraim, Utah

- U.S. National Register of Historic Places
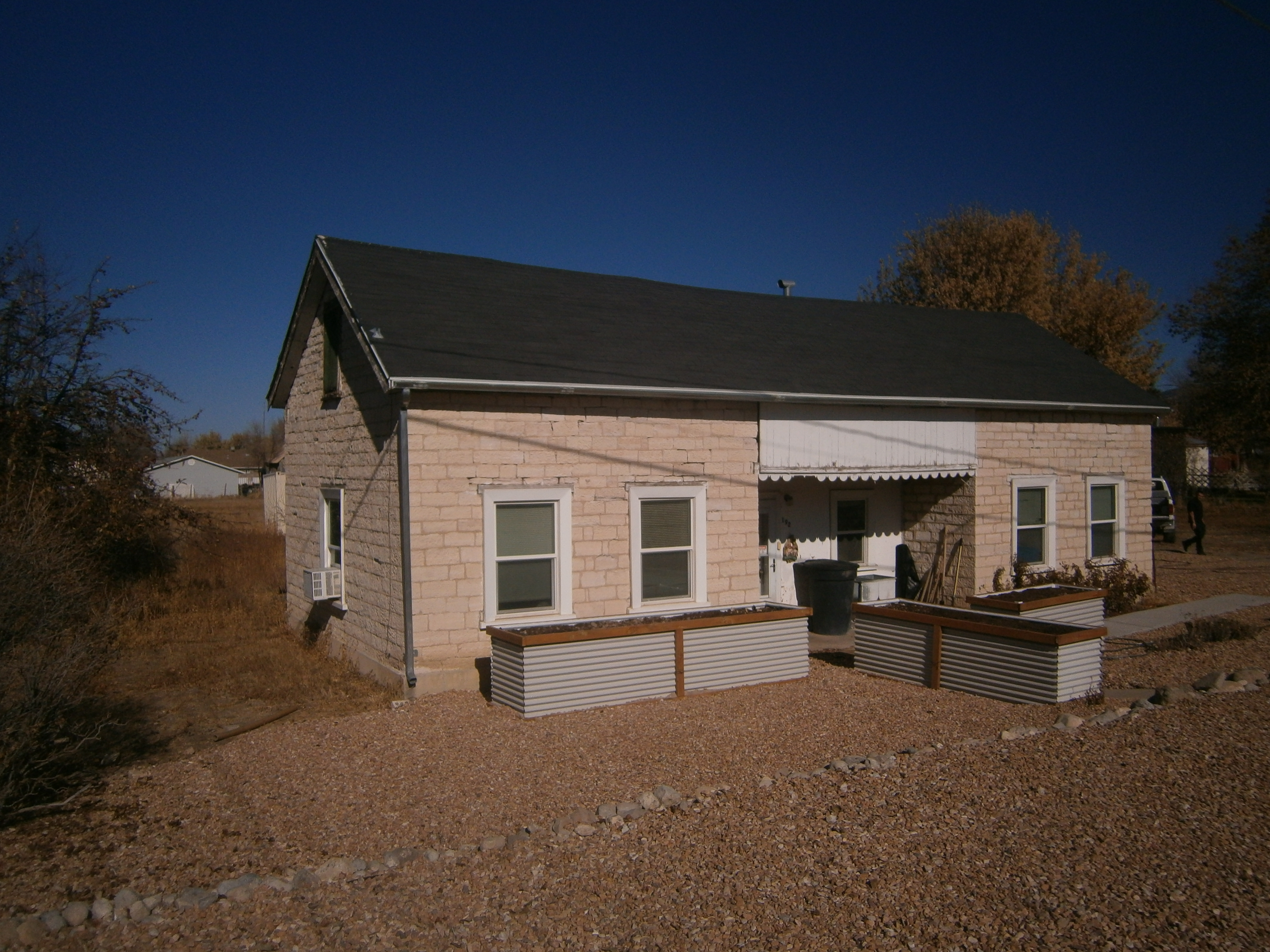
- Jens Nielsen House in 2019

- Location within Utah
- Location: 192 W. 200 South, Ephraim, Utah
- Coordinates: 39.356442°N 111.591604°W
- Area: Less than one acre
- Built: c.1870
- MPS: Scandinavian-American pair-houses
- NRHP reference No.: 83003191
- Added to NRHP: February 1, 1983

The Jens Nielsen House in Ephraim, Utah, is a one-story limestone and adobe pair-house built around 1870. It was listed on the National Register of Historic Places in 1983 and deemed "significant as an example of Scandinavian vernacular architecture in Utah."

== Structure ==
The building is an example of what has been termed a "Type IV pair-house", given it has a tripartite plan (appears to have three equal-sized rooms, each with two bays, and an indented porch in the center section. The outside rooms are stone with a coursed ashlar finish; the center section is adobe, plastered over and marked off on the front to resemble stonework. In 1981, the house remained in a similar condition as when it was built, 110 years before, with the only significant change being a shed roof frame extension to the rear.

The structure was probably built by Jens Christian Nielsen, a Danish-born farmer, around 1870.
