= Greaves-Deakin House =

- U.S. National Register of Historic Places
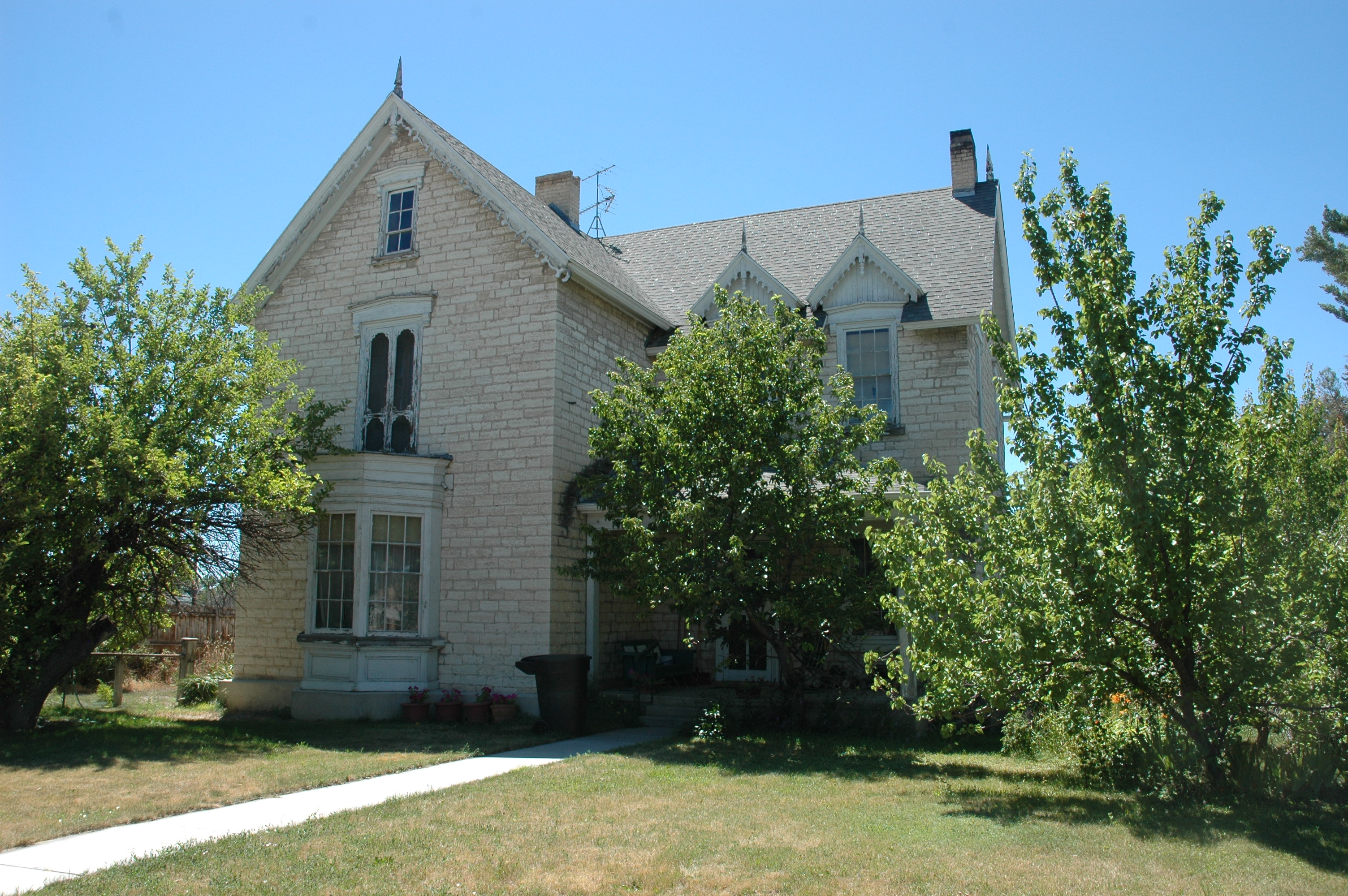
- The house in 2011

- Location within Utah Location within the United States
- Location: 118 South Main Street, Ephraim, Utah
- Coordinates: 39°21′27″N 111°35′13″W
- Area: less than one acre
- Built: 1875
- Architectural style: Greek Revival, Gothic Revival, Vernacular
- NRHP reference No.: 80003942
- Added to NRHP: October 3, 1980

The Greaves-Deakin House is a historic two-story house in Ephraim, Utah. It was built in 1875 by Peter Greaves, a native of Paterson, New Jersey who converted to the Church of Jesus Christ of Latter-day Saints with his family in the late 1840s and moved to Sanpete County in 1856. He became a landowner and the president of Andrews and Co., a shipping company based in Nephi, and he also served as a member of the Territorial Legislature from 1891 to 1896. The house was designed in the Greek Revival and Gothic Revival architectural styles. It was inherited by one of his daughters and son-in-law, William Price Deakin. It has been listed on the National Register of Historic Places since October 3, 1980.
