= Fredrick Christian Sorensen House =

- U.S. National Register of Historic Places
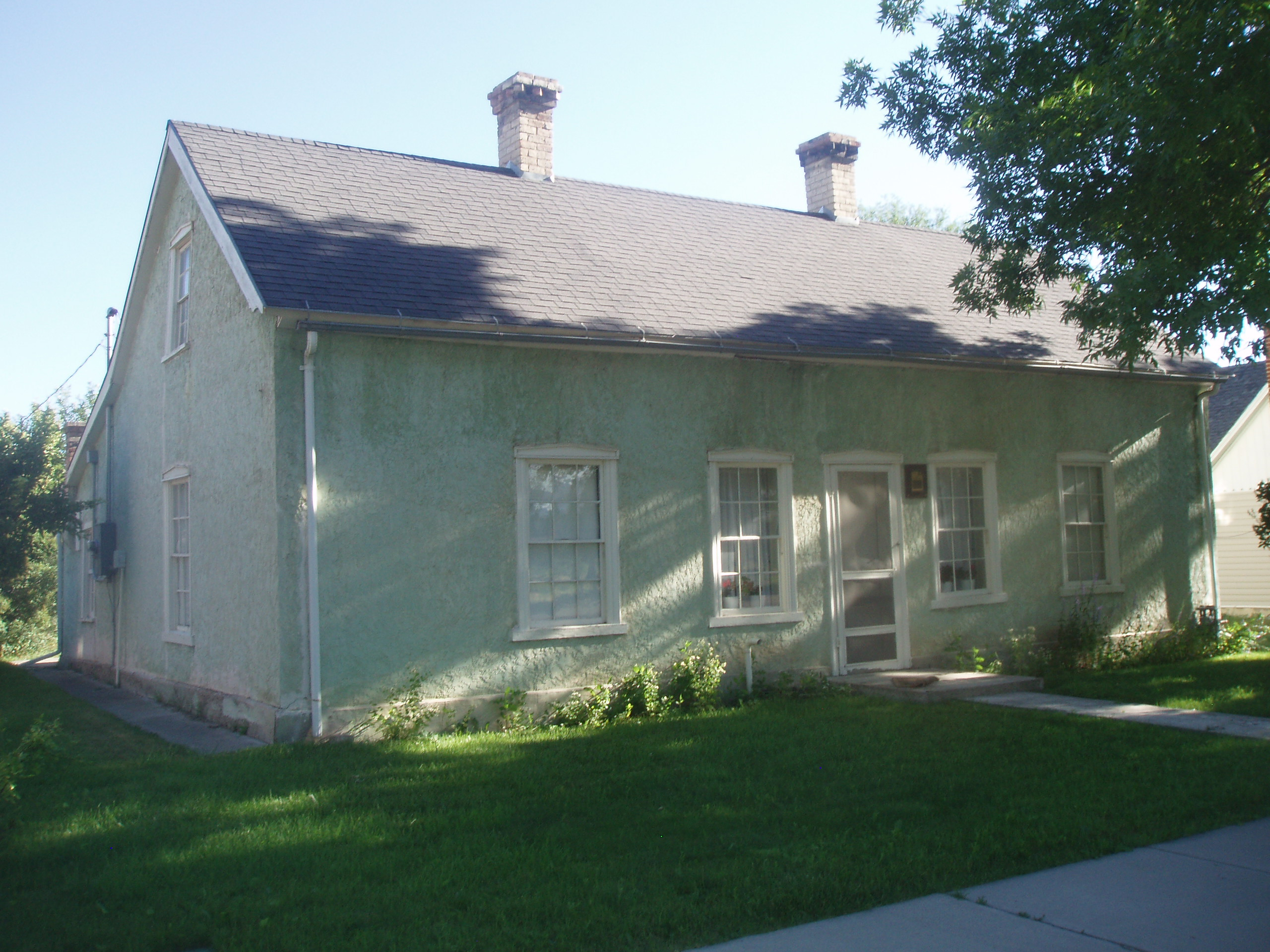

- Location within Utah Location within the United States
- Location: E. Center St. (between Main and E. 100), Ephraim, Utah
- Coordinates: 39°21′35″N 111°35′06″W
- Area: less than one acre
- Built: c.1870
- Architectural style: Pair-house
- NRHP reference No.: 80003944
- Added to NRHP: October 14, 1980

The Fredrick Christian Sorensen House, on E. Center St. in Ephraim, Utah, was built in c.1870. It was listed on the National Register of Historic Places in 1980.

It is an adobe one-and-a-half-story pair-house with its front facade including one window into each of its side rooms, and window-door-window into its center room. The house is 42 feet (13 m) long.
