= Lars S. Andersen House =

- U.S. National Register of Historic Places
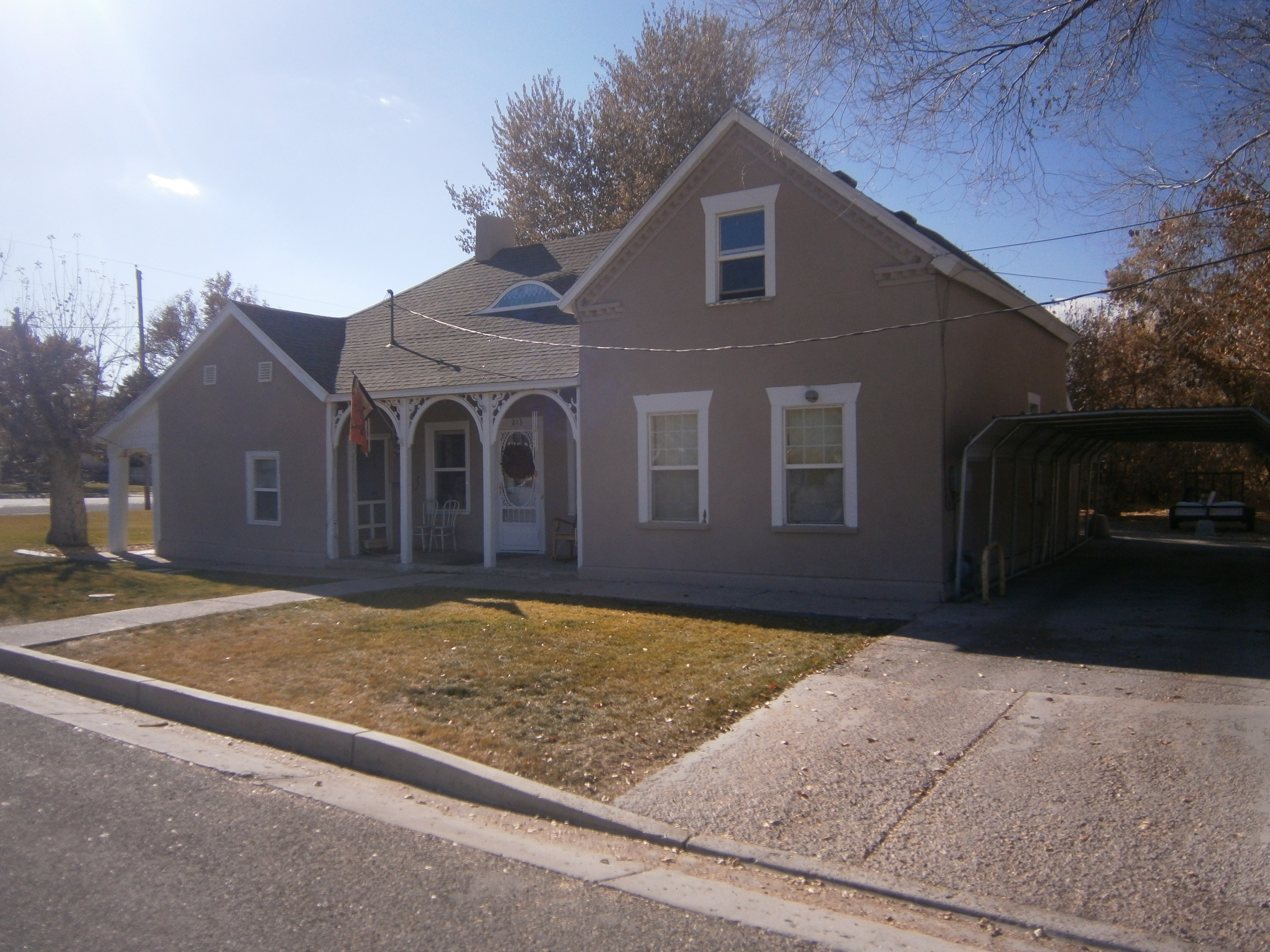

- Location within Utah Location within the United States
- Location: 213 N. 200 East, Ephraim, Utah
- Coordinates: 39.363775°N 111.582103°W
- Area: less than one acre
- Built: 1870
- Architectural style: Late Victorian
- MPS: Scandinavian-American Pair-houses TR
- NRHP reference No.: 83003184
- Added to NRHP: February 1, 1983

The Lars S. Andersen House, located at 213 N. 200 East in Ephraim, Utah, was built in 1870. It was listed on the National Register of Historic Places in 1983.

The house's original section is a 14 by 13 feet (4.3 m × 4.0 m) stone "square-cabin" in which is now the southwest corner of the house. Two adobe rooms were added to the east, making a three-room pair house of Scandinavian form. Its south-facing facade is unusual, among "Type II pair-houses", for its symmetrical six openings (of 2-2-2 per room) rather than more common (1-3-1 per room) configuration. A long overhanging porch was added along this facade, at that time, with stylized square columns having carved scrollwork at their tops.

Later, an entire one-and-a-half-story T-plan house, of Victorian pattern book design, was added to the north rear, with the base of the T joining the rear of the main house. This portion has corbelled brickwork along its raking eaves and cornice returns, and it has a porch with milled porch posts and scroll-cut tracery.

Andersen was born in Denmark in 1829. He immigrated to Utah and eventually became Bishop of Ephraim.

The house is on the northwest corner of N. 200 East and E. 200 North.
