= Claus P. Andersen House =

Historic house in Utah, United States

- U.S. National Register of Historic Places
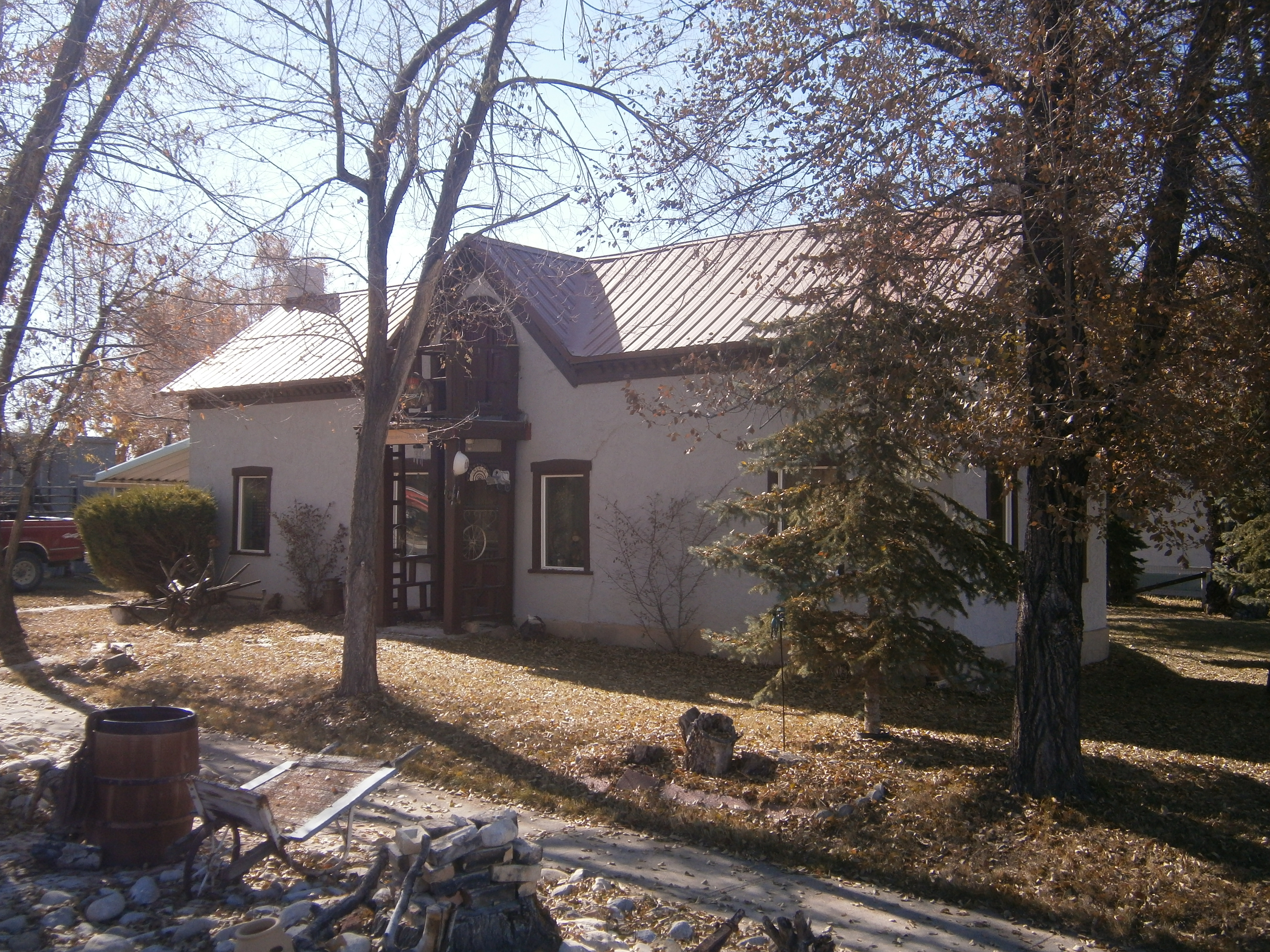

- Location within Utah Location within the United States
- Location: 202 South 200 East; Ephraim, Utah; United States
- Coordinates: 39.356072°N 111.582115°W
- Area: less than one acre
- Built: 1865
- MPS: Scandinavian-American Pair-houses TR
- NRHP reference No.: 83003183
- Added to NRHP: February 1, 1983

The Claus P. Andersen House, in Ephraim. Utah, United States was built c.1865. It was listed on the National Register of Historic Places in 1983.

== Description ==
The house, which is located at 202 South 200 East, is one of the oldest residences in Ephraim, it was deemed significant as an example of Scandinavian vernacular architecture. It is a one-and-a-half-story adobe pair-house which originally had the common window configuration of seven openings on the front facade: two windows into each outside room, and window-door-window into the center room. The center room's windows were later filled in by adobe.

It is located on the southwest corner of E 200 S and S 200 E.

== See also ==
- National Register of Historic Places listings in Sanpete County, Utah
