= Rasmus Jensen House =

- U.S. National Register of Historic Places
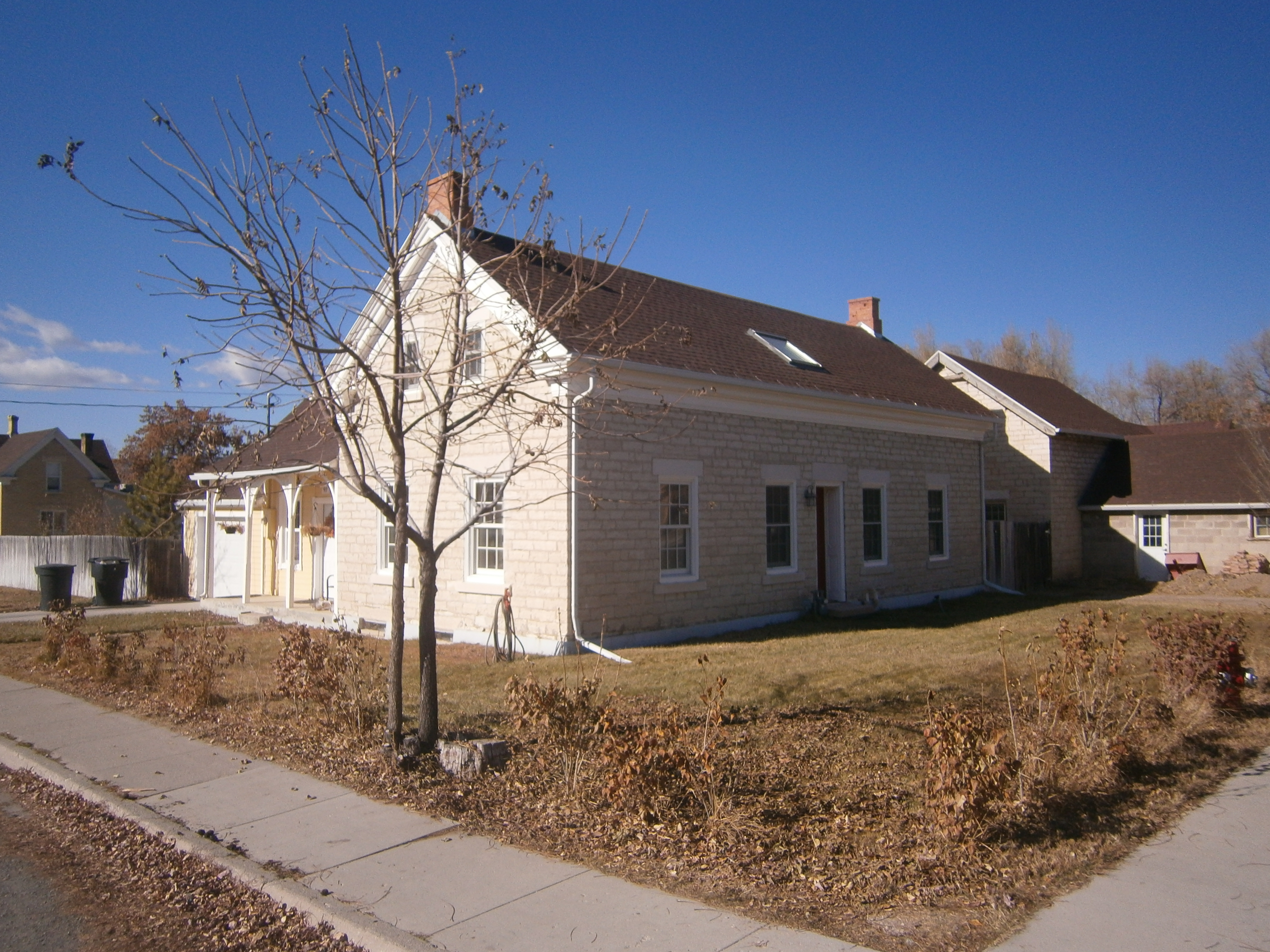

- Location within Utah Location within the United States
- Location: 97 E. 100 South, Ephraim, Utah
- Coordinates: 39.358222°N 111.584507°W
- Area: less than one acre
- Built: c.1870
- MPS: Scandinavian-American Pair-houses TR
- NRHP reference No.: 83003189
- Added to NRHP: February 1, 1983

The Rasmus Jensen House, located at 97 E. 100 South in Ephraim, Utah, was built in 1870. It was listed on the National Register of Historic Places in 1983.

It is a vernacular pair-house. It was deemed "significant as an example of Scandinavian vernacular architecture in Utah. The house contributes historically to the thematic nomination, "The Scandinavian-American Pair-house in Utah."".

It was built probably in the early 1870s for Rasmus Jensen, who was born in Denmark in 1842 and immigrated to Utah in 1863, and who was to be married in 1876.
