= David and Evinda Madsen House =

- U.S. National Register of Historic Places
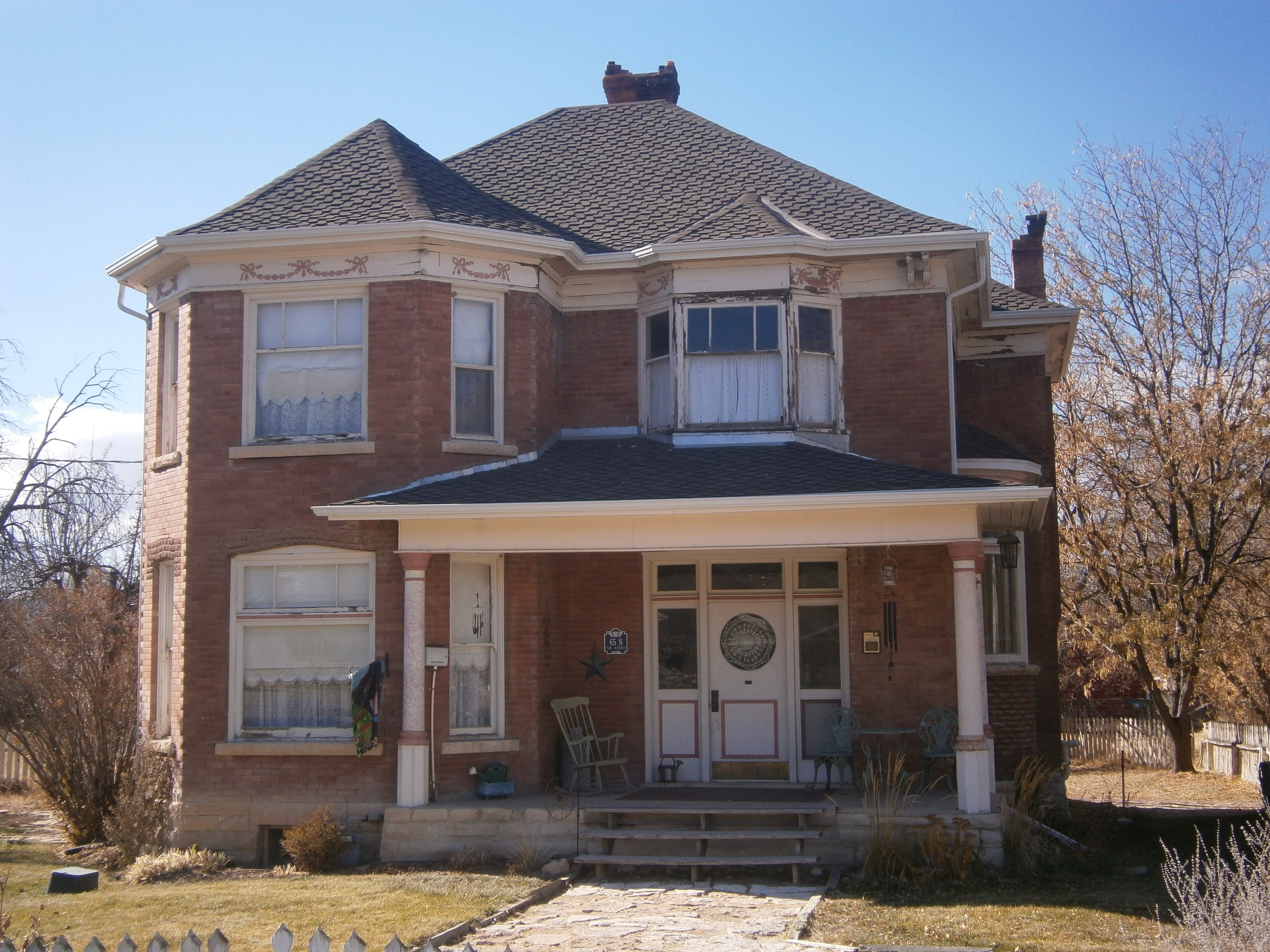

- Location within Utah Location within the United States
- Location: 65 N. 100 W., Ephraim, Utah
- Coordinates: 39.361000°N 111.589840°W
- Area: .74 acres (0.30 ha)
- Architectural style: Italianate; Victorian Eclectic
- NRHP reference No.: 14000383
- Added to NRHP: July 3, 2014

The David and Evinda Madsen House, 65 N. 100 W. in Ephraim, Utah, was built in 1900. It was listed on the National Register of Historic Places in 2014.

It is a two-story house built of dark red brick upon an ashlar limestone foundation, with Italianate/Victorian Eclectic styling.

The house is noted "for its distinctive design and also for its association with Scandinavian immigrant design influences. The Madsen House is an excellent example of changing construction design and the introduction of Victorian styles in Sanpete County in the late 19th century. During this time, increasing economic and social exposure of the citizens of Sanpete County resulted in movement away from local vernacular designs. However, the Madsen House also retains significant stone and wood elements which reflect unique Scandinavian design and construction techniques. Scandinavian immigrants heavily influenced Sanpete County architecture and culture from its founding through the first decades of the 20th century."

It was deemed significant in part for association with the Madsen family, including David Madsen (1858–1963), who was the son of a co-founder of Ephraim. David was an early importer of sheep into the area; sheep "transformed the Sanpete County economy". He also "developed several large water sources which stabilized and greatly expanded Sanpete farming and ranching."

== See also ==
- Cyrus Wheelock House, known also as "Madsen House", in Mount Pleasant. It is also in Sanpete County and is NRHP-listed.
