= Annie Birch House =

- U.S. National Register of Historic Places
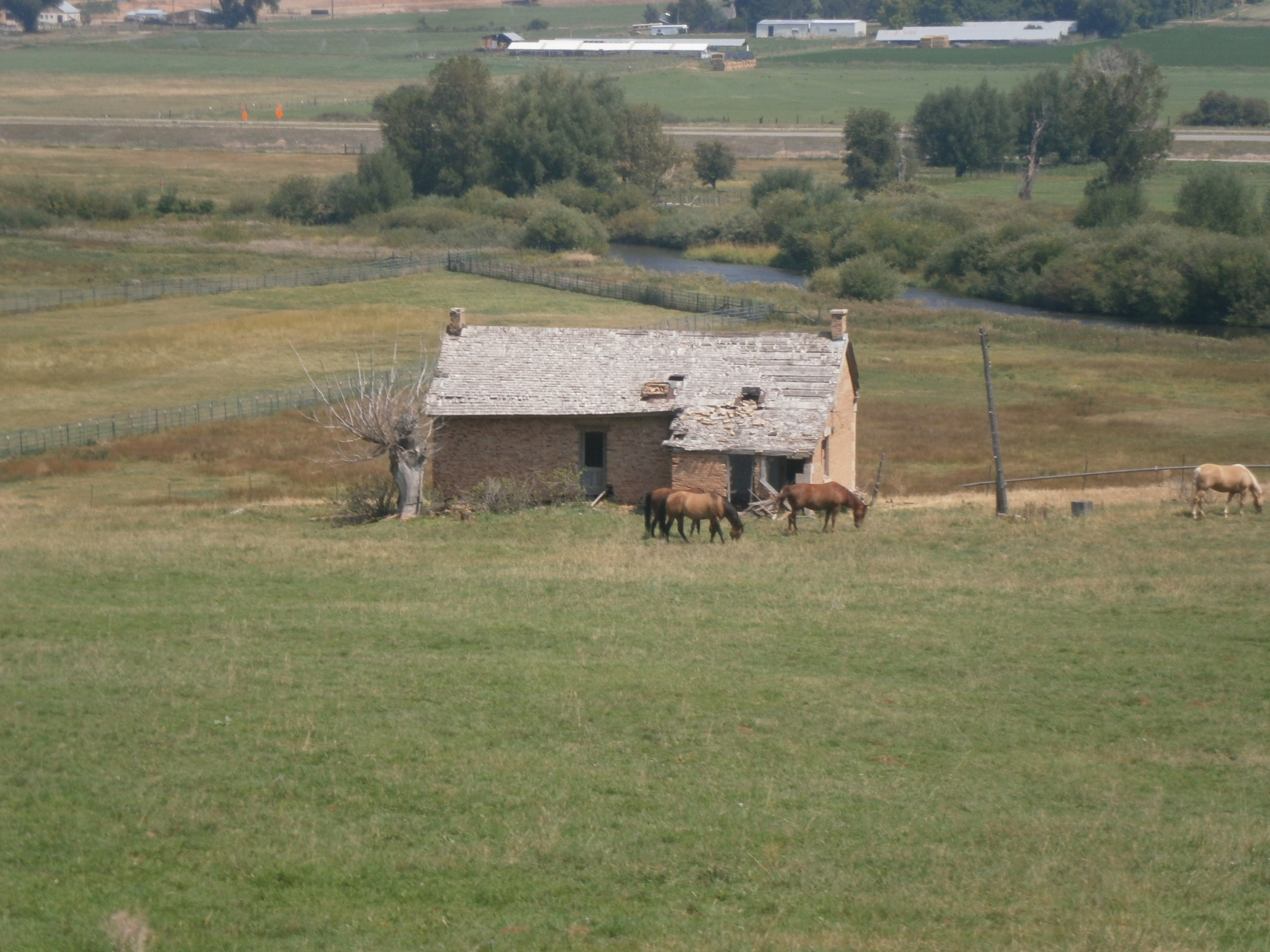
- View from behind

- Location within Utah
- Nearest city: Hoytsville, Utah
- Coordinates: 40°53′12″N 111°23′59″W
- Area: less than one acre
- Built: 1875
- Architectural style: vernacular Pair House
- MPS: Scandinavian-American Pair-houses TR
- NRHP reference No.: 84000163
- Added to NRHP: October 22, 1984

The Annie Birch House, near Hoytsville, Utah, was built in 1875. It was listed on the National Register of Historic Places in 1984.

It is located at approximately 900 S. West Hoytsville Rd., off I-80.

It is a vernacular Pair House.
