= Andrew Barentsen House =

- U.S. National Register of Historic Places
- Location within Utah Location within the United States
- Location: 195 W. 200 South, Fountain Green, Utah
- Coordinates: 39°37′28″N 111°38′22″W
- Area: less than one acre
- Built: 1874
- MPS: Scandinavian-American Pair-houses TR
- NRHP reference No.: 83003185
- Added to NRHP: February 1, 1983

The Andrew Barentsen House, located at 195 W. 200 South in Fountain Green in Sanpete County, Utah, was built in 1874. It was listed on the National Register of Historic Places in 1983.

It is a one-and-a-half-story brick house with a three-room pair-house plan. It has paired internal chimneys which have decorative corbelling on the ridge of the house's roof. Its windows have smooth stone pediments. A stone over the front door indicates "1874". It has a one-story rear extension which seems to be original.

Andrew Marcus Barentsen, born in 1833 in Bovsthoue, Ribe, Grimstrup Parish, Denmark, joined the Church of Jesus Christ of Latter-day Saints in the 1850s and immigrated to Utah in 1863. He was a farmer and cattleman, and had two wives: Gertrude H. Ericksen who lived in this brick house with him, and Petrea Jorgensen who lived in a small frame house on the property.

The house had been used for hay storage in the 1970s, and in 1981 it was vacant and was in deteriorated condition.

The house still existed, and appeared vacant, in 2007, at the southeast corner of W. 200 S. St. and S. 200 W. St. in Fountain Green. It no longer appears to exist at that location in 2018.
