= Anders Hintze House =

- U.S. National Register of Historic Places
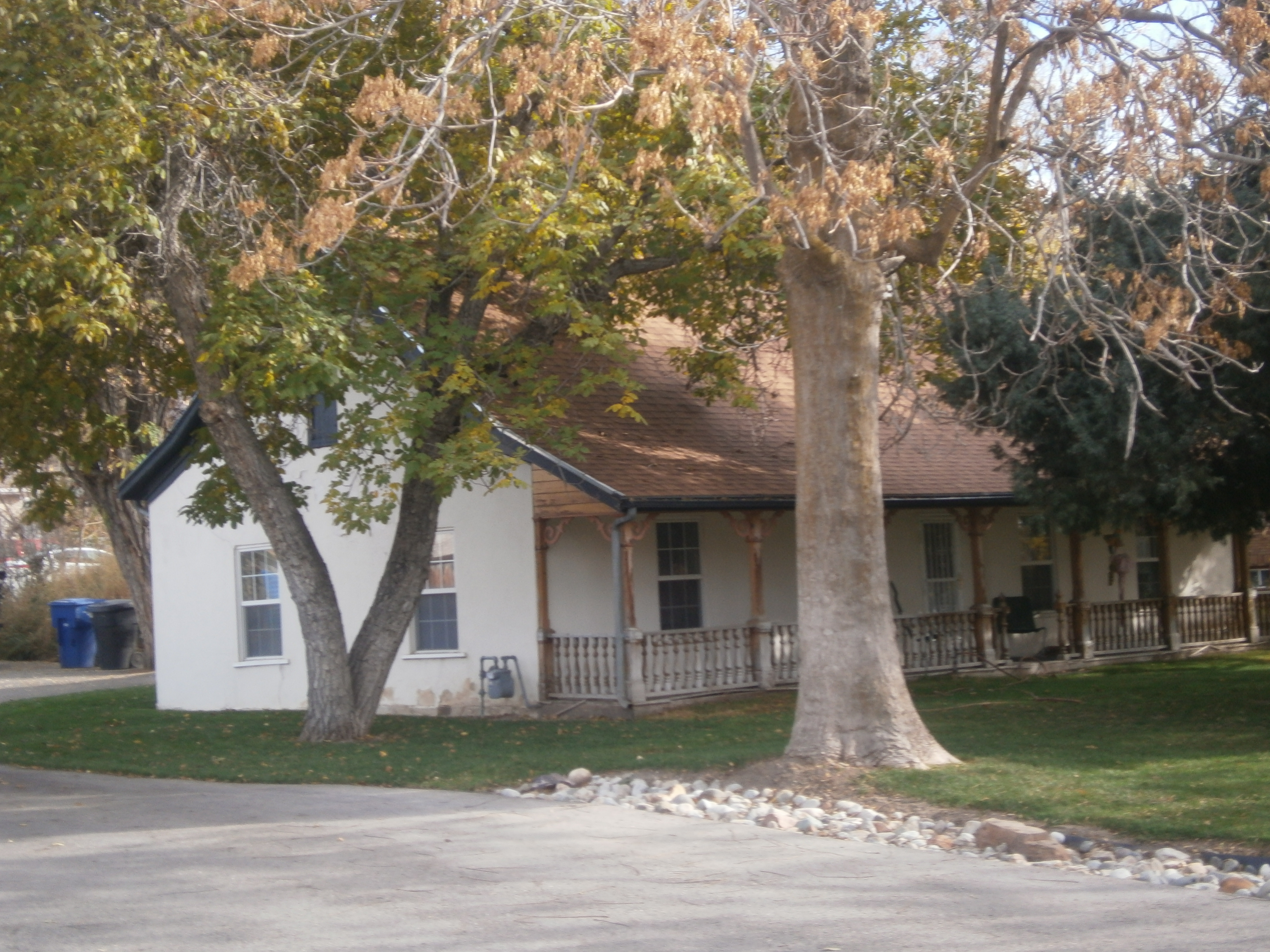

- Location within Utah Location within the United States
- Location: 4249 S. 2300 East, Holladay, Utah
- Coordinates: 40°40′48″N 111°49′25″W
- Area: less than one acre
- Built: c.1863-64
- Architectural style: Type IIA pair-house
- MPS: Scandinavian-American Pair-houses TR
- NRHP reference No.: 83004424
- Added to NRHP: February 1, 1983

The Anders Hintze House, located at 4249 S. 2300 East in Holladay, Utah, was built in c.1863-64. It is a "Type IIA" pair-house. It was listed on the National Register of Historic Places in 1983.

The house was deemed "significant as an example of Scandinavian vernacular architecture in Utah", and it is one of few houses in the Salt Lake valley surviving from the 1860s. It is a one-story adobe house with a stucco exterior that was applied in the 1940s, when an original scroll-bracketed porch was removed.

It was built by Anders Hintze, who was born in 1821 in Herslev, Roskilde Parish, Denmark, who converted to the LDS church in the 1850s and came to Utah early in the 1860s. The house was home for one of his three wives, Karen Sophie Swenson; the other wives lived in smaller houses on the family property.

A plan of the house and a photograph were exhibited at the Danish Immigrant Museum in 2001. The museum termed it a "three-part house", reflecting it having a central room with side rooms. In this example, the side rooms are two deep.
