= Hans Ottesen House =

- U.S. National Register of Historic Places
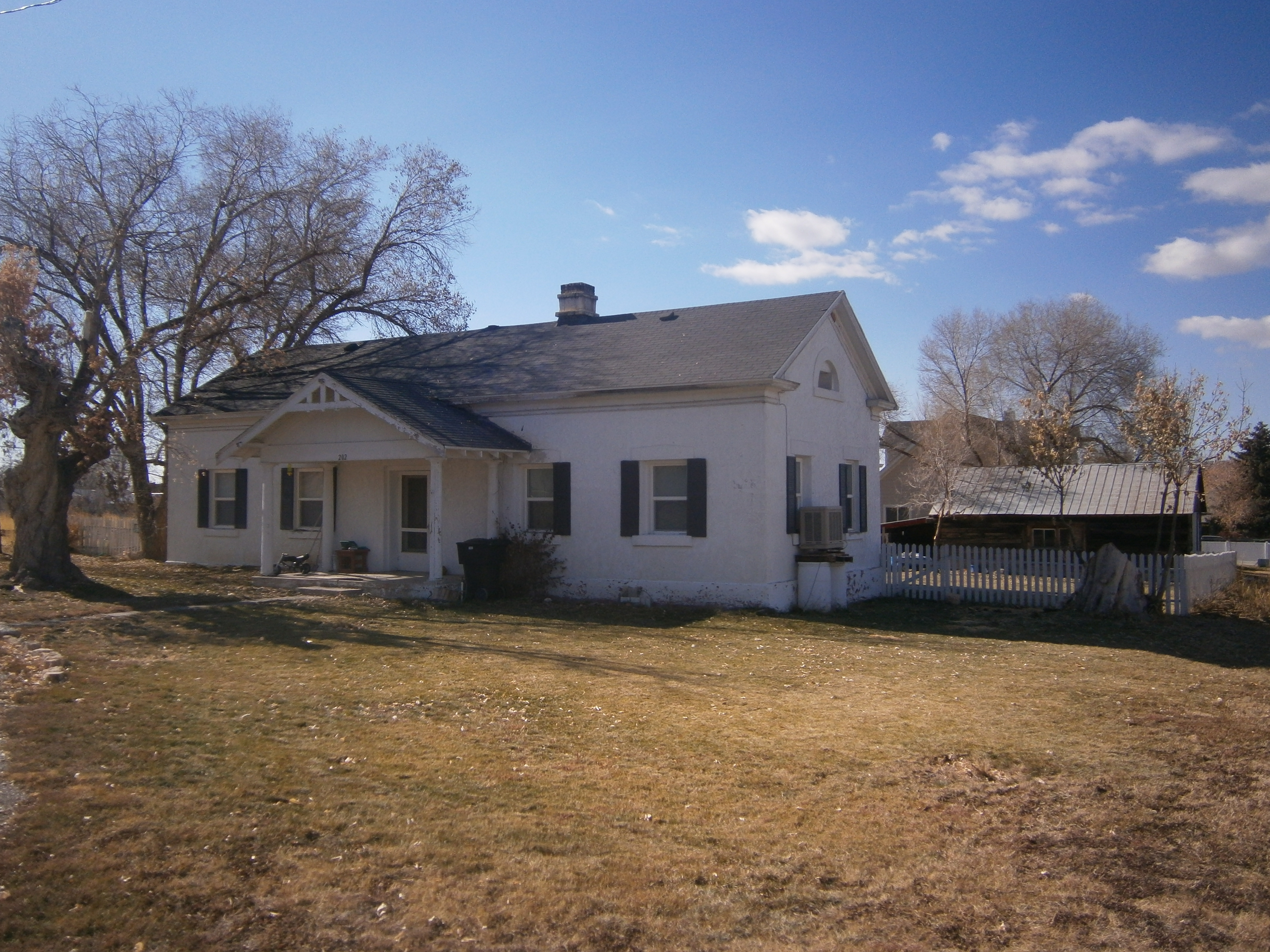

- Location within Utah Location within the United States
- Location: 202 S. 200 W, Manti, Utah
- Coordinates: 39.262295°N 111.641071°W
- Area: less than one acre
- Built: c.1865-1875
- Architectural style: Greek Revival, Pair-house
- MPS: Scandinavian-American Pair-houses TR
- NRHP reference No.: 87001177
- Added to NRHP: August 6, 1987

The Hans Ottesen House, at 202 S. 200 West in Manti, Utah, was built in c.1865-1875. It was listed on the National Register of Historic Places in 1987.

It is a one-and-a-half-story pair-house.

It was built by, and home of, Hans Ottesen, who was born in Aalborg, Denmark, in 1834, and who emigrated to Utah in the 1850. Ottesen was murdered at the house on November 2, 1884, by two men attempting to rob the house. Ownership passed to his nephew Otto Ottesen, who served as sheriff in Manti.
