= Oluf Larsen House =

- U.S. National Register of Historic Places
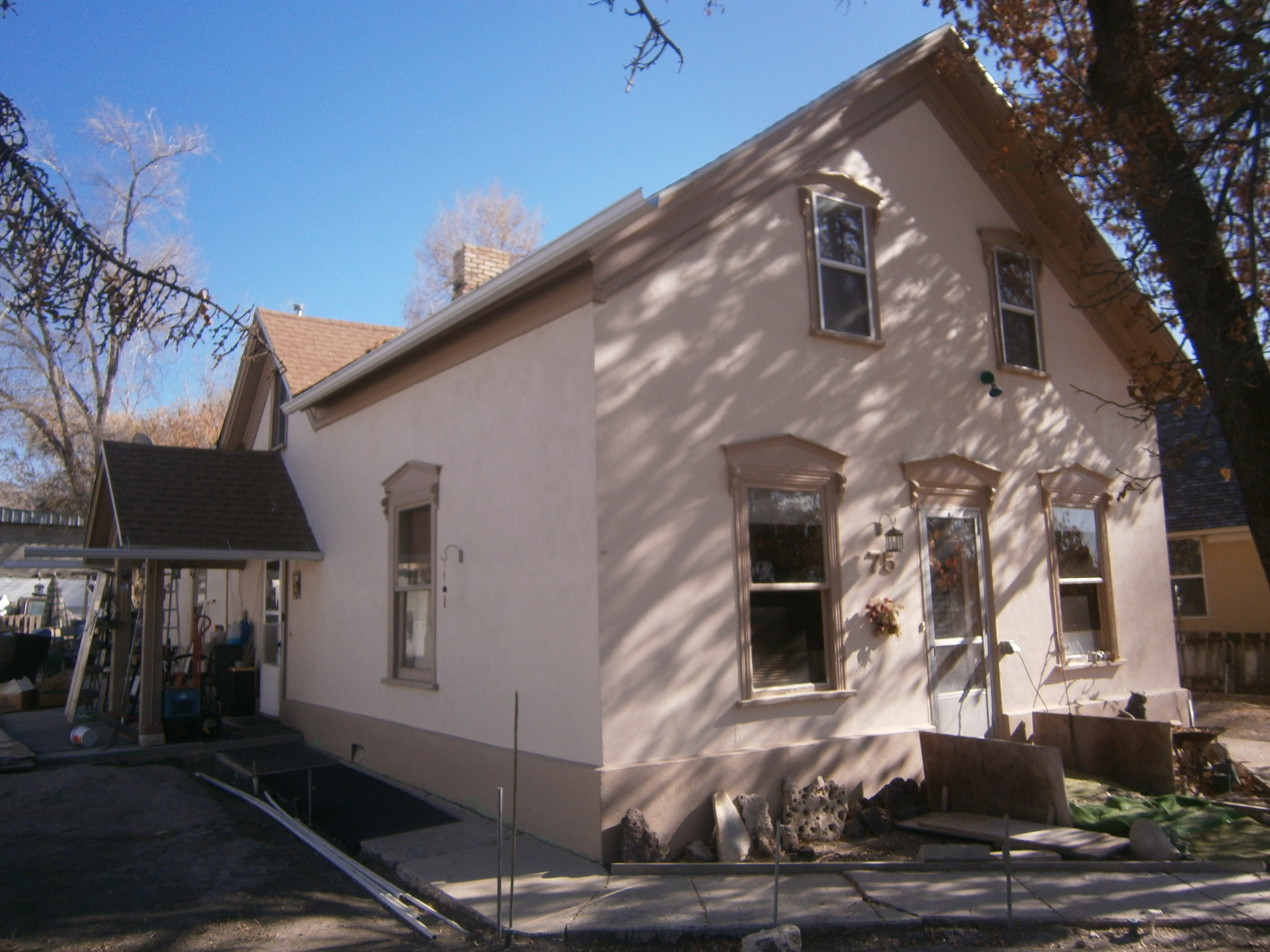

- Location within Utah Location within the United States
- Location: 75 S. 100 West, Ephraim, Utah
- Coordinates: 39.358509°N 111.589195°W
- Area: less than one acre
- Built: 1870
- Architectural style: Greek Revival
- MPS: Scandinavian-American Pair-houses TR
- NRHP reference No.: 83003190
- Added to NRHP: February 1, 1983

The Oluf Larsen House, at 75 S. 100 West in Ephraim, Utah, is a historic pair-house which was built in 1870. It was listed on the National Register of Historic Places in 1983.

It is a one-and-a-half-story adobe house with elements of Greek Revival style. In the early 1900s it was plastered and painted to simulate brick, and then later it was stuccoed. It has paired internal stove chimneys and "is a rare example of the TYPE I pair house."

It was home of Oluf Larsen, who was born in Drammen, Norway in 1836. After converting to the LDS church in 1857, he immigrated to Salt Lake City, Utah, in 1861.

The house was home, after 1890, of Ellen G. Dorius, a polygamous wife of C.C.N. Dorius.

The house is on the east side of a north–south street; its front, however, faces north.
