= Soren Simonsen House =

- U.S. National Register of Historic Places
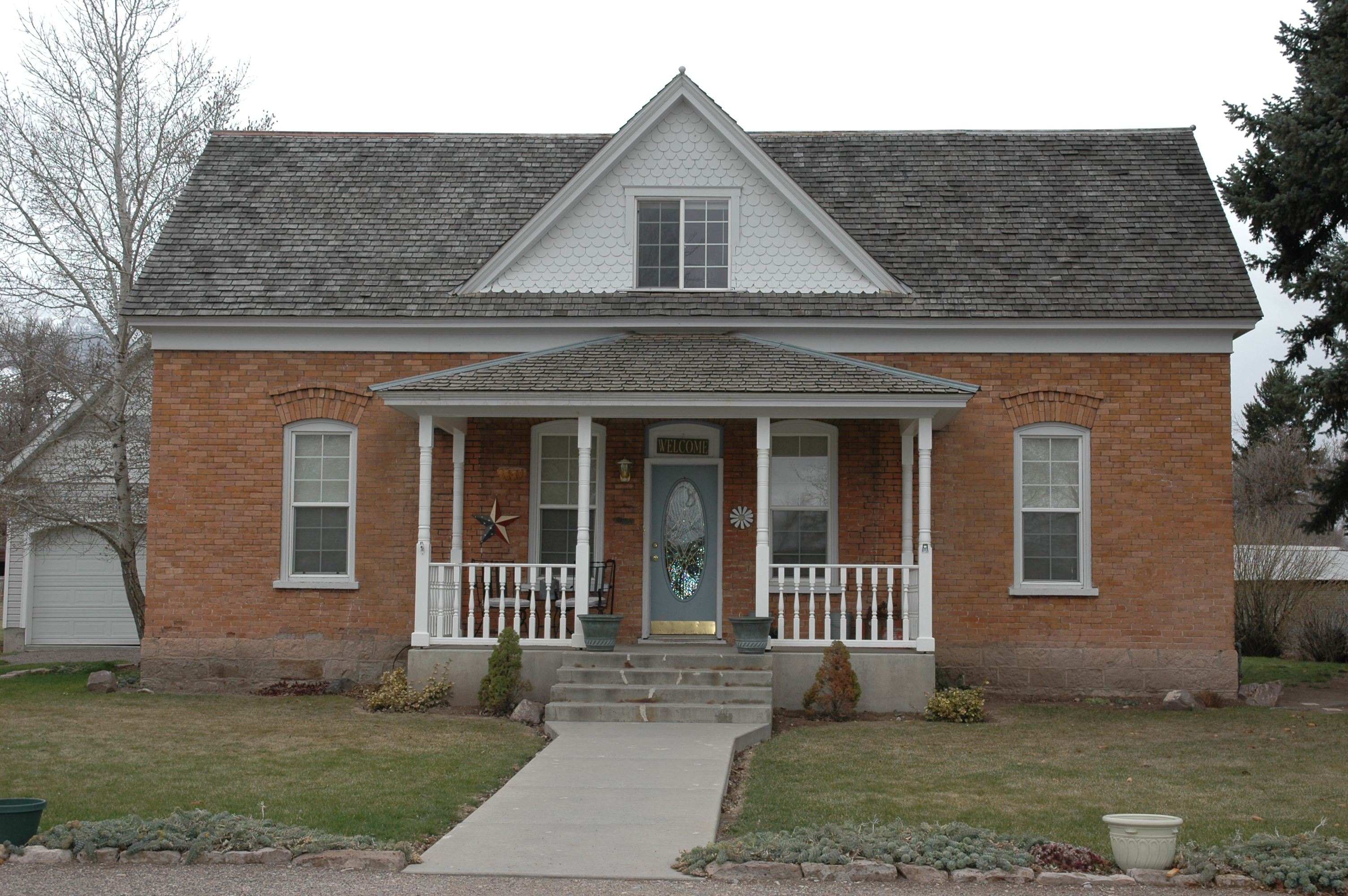
- Location: 55 W. 200 North, Monroe, Utah
- Coordinates: 38°38′06″N 112°07′19″W
- Area: 0.5 acres (0.20 ha)
- Built: c.1880
- Architectural style: Mixed (more Than 2 Styles From Different Periods)
- MPS: Scandinavian-American Pair-houses TR
- NRHP reference No.: 82001758
- Added to NRHP: October 20, 1982

The Soren Simonsen House, located at 55 W. 200 North in Monroe, Utah, was built in c.1880. It was listed on the National Register of Historic Places in 1982.

It is a one-and-a-half-story, brick, vernacular pair-house with two internal chimneys.

It was deemed "significant as an example of Scandinavian vernacular architecture in Utah."
