= Peter Axel Johnson House =

Historic house in Utah, United States

- U.S. National Register of Historic Places
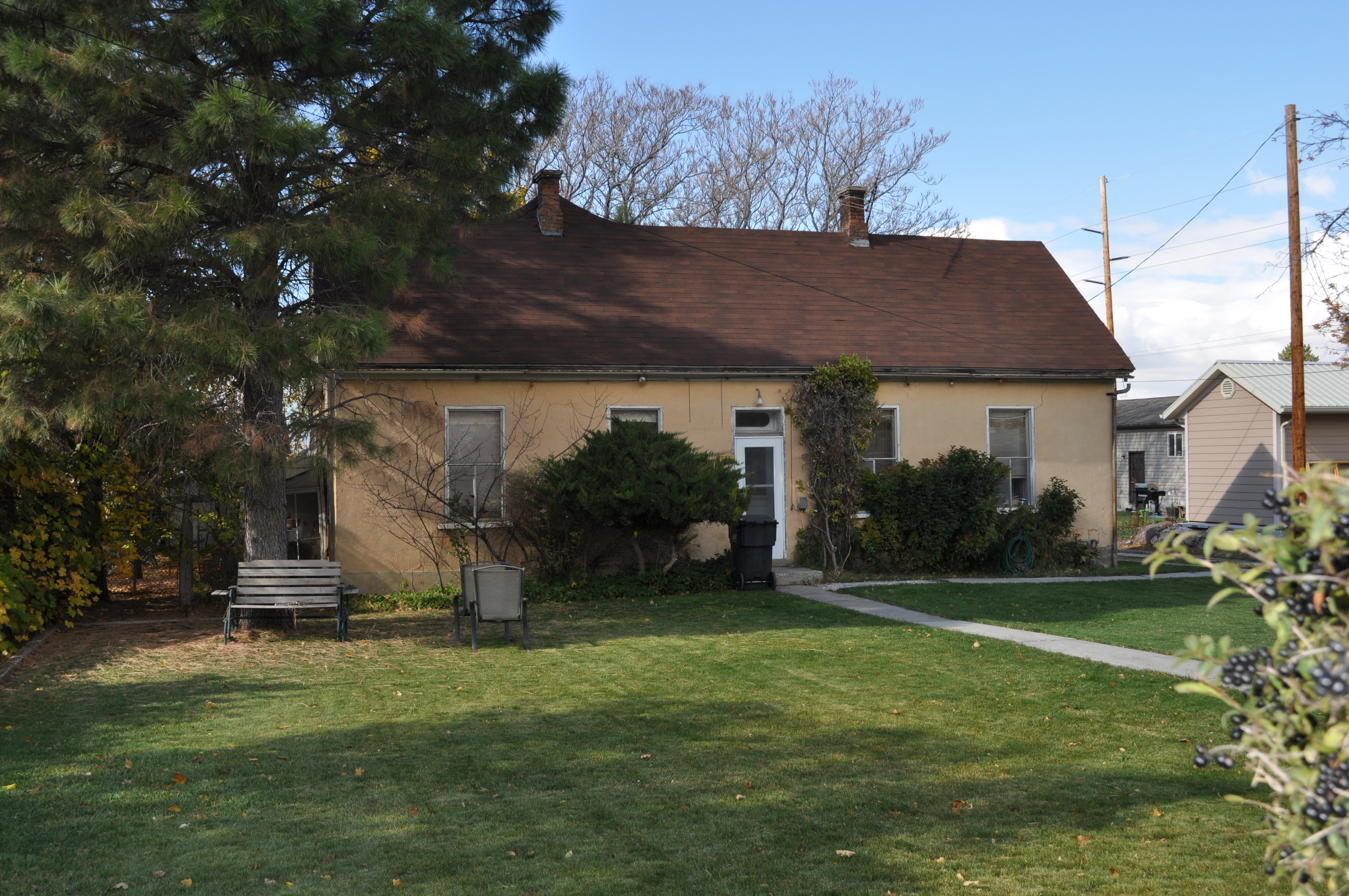

- Location within Utah Location within the United States
- Location: 1075 N. 100 East, Pleasant Grove, Utah
- Coordinates: 40°22′30″N 111°44′21″W
- Area: 2.6 acres (1.1 ha)
- Built: 1876
- Architectural style: Greek Revival, pair-house
- MPS: Scandinavian-American Pair-houses TR
- NRHP reference No.: 84000164
- Added to NRHP: October 22, 1984

The Peter Axel Johnson House at 1075 N. 100 East in Pleasant Grove, Utah was built in 1876. It includes both Greek Revival architecture and Scandinavian pair-house architecture. The house is a one and half story stone house. It was built by Peter Axel Johnson, a Mormon who emigrated from Sweden.

Peter Axel Johnson (1843-1936) was born in Alminge, Sweden. After converting to the LDS church, he immigrated to Utah in 1871.

It was listed on the National Register of Historic Places in 1984.
