= Larsen-Noyes House =

- U.S. National Register of Historic Places
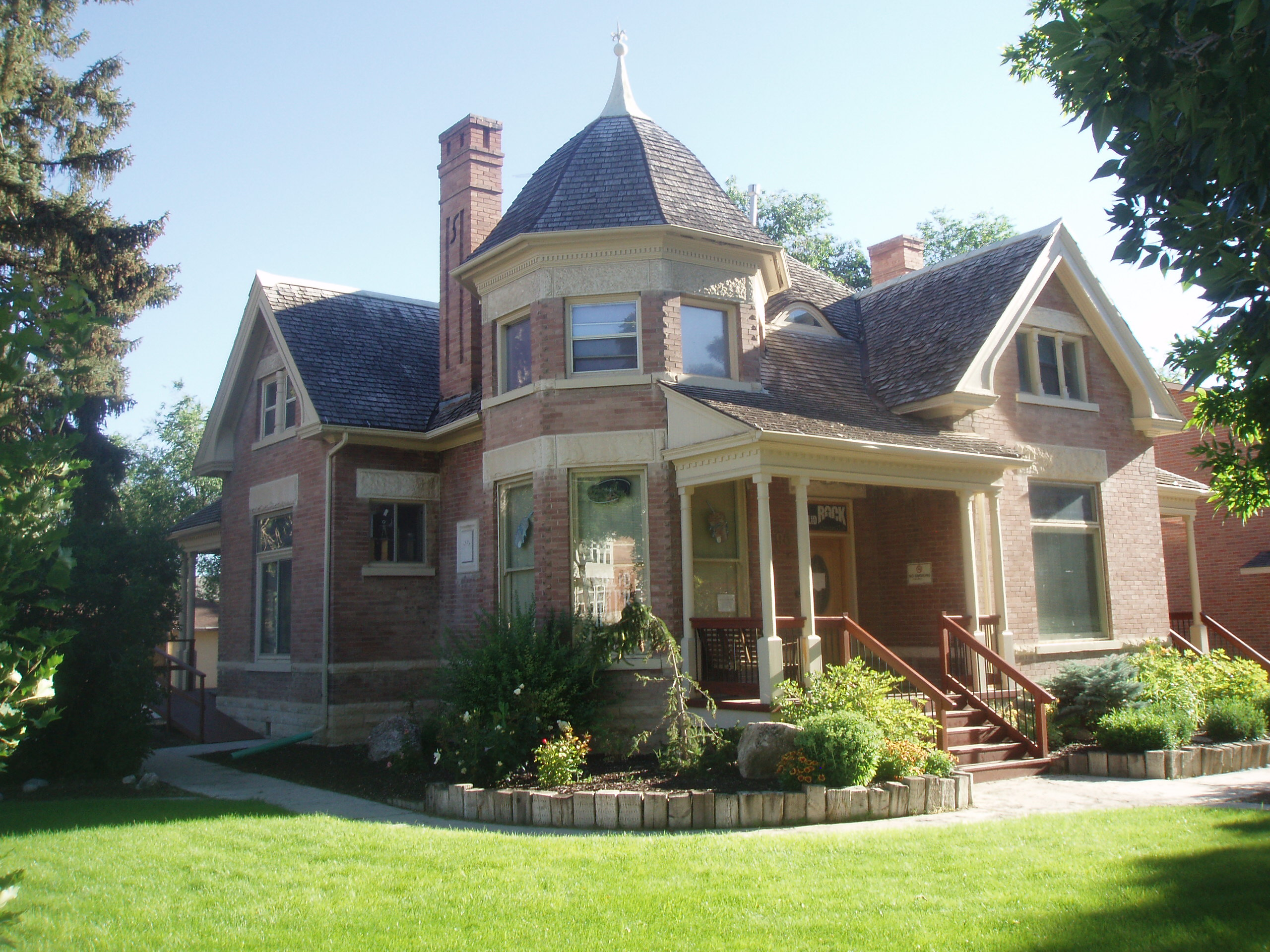
- The house in 2011

- Location within Utah Location within the United States
- Location: 96 East Center Street, Ephraim, Utah
- Coordinates: 39°21′34″N 111°35′01″W
- Area: less than one acre
- Built: 1897
- Built by: Albert Johnson
- Architectural style: Gothic, Vernacular Victorian
- NRHP reference No.: 78002688
- Added to NRHP: December 1, 1978

The Larsen-Noyes House is a historic house in Ephraim, Utah. It was built in 1897 by Albert Johnson, an immigrant from Norway, for H. P. Larsen, an immigrant from Denmark. It was later purchased by Newton Eugene Noyes, the president of Sanpete Stake Academy, later known as Snow College, for 29 years. It has been listed on the National Register of Historic Places since December 1, 1978.
