= Cyrus Wheelock House =

- U.S. National Register of Historic Places
- Location within Utah Location within the United States
- Location: 200 E. 100 North, Mount Pleasant, Utah
- Coordinates: 39.548500°N 111.451256°W
- Area: less than one acre
- Built: 1860
- Architectural style: Utah vernacular
- NRHP reference No.: 80003955
- Added to NRHP: October 3, 1980

The Cyrus Wheelock House, at 200 E. 100 North in Mount Pleasant, Utah, was built around 1860. It was listed on the National Register of Historic Places in 1980.

It is a one-and-a-half-story adobe "square cabin", a folk/vernacular house type, about 18 by 15 feet (5.5 m × 4.6 m) in plan.

It may also be known as the Madsen House.

It is located at the northeast corner of N 200 E and E 100 N. It faces onto N 200 E. In 1980, the street edges of the property were set off by a white picket fence. By 2016 the picket fence was gone, replaced by a solid wood fence. And the house looks considerably transformed, including by an apparent addition on its north side.

== See also ==
- David and Evinda Madsen House, in Ephraim, also in Sanpete County and NRHP-listed
