= Christen Larsen House =

Historic house in Utah, United States

- U.S. National Register of Historic Places
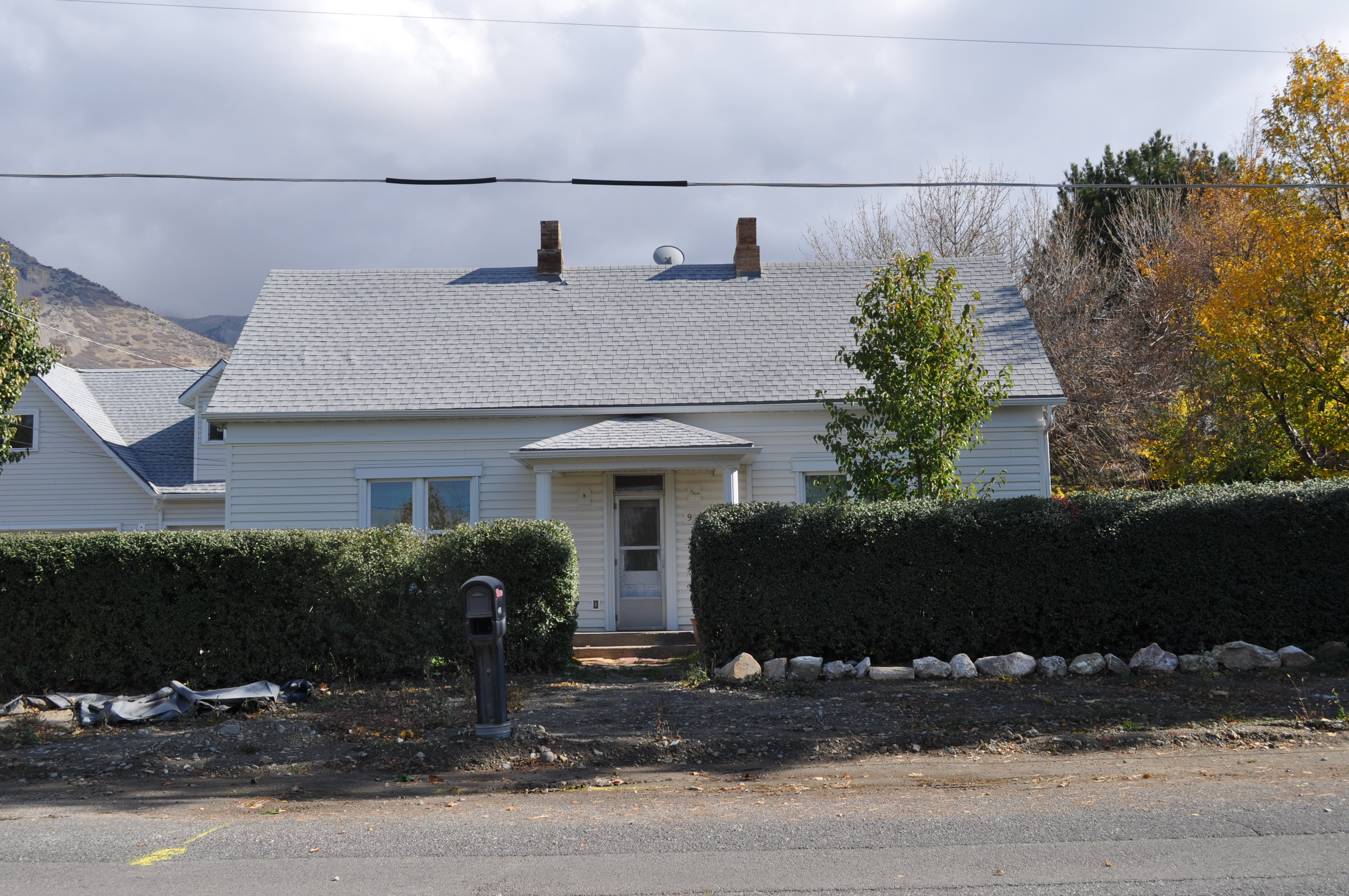

- Location within Utah Location within the United States
- Location: 990 N. 400 E, Pleasant Grove, Utah
- Coordinates: 40°22′29″N 111°43′54″W
- Area: 2.5 acres (1.0 ha)
- Built: c.1876
- Built by: Larsen, Christen
- Architectural style: Classical Revival, Pair-house
- MPS: Scandinavian-American Pair-houses TR
- NRHP reference No.: 87001178
- Added to NRHP: July 13, 1987

The Christen Larsen House at 990 N. 400 E in Pleasant Grove, Utah was built in c.1876. It was listed on the National Register of Historic Places in 1987.

It is a one-story pair-house built of soft tufa rock.

== See also ==
- Neils Peter Larsen House, also NRHP-listed in Pleasant Grove
