= Chris Larsen House =

Historic house in Iowa, United States

- U.S. National Register of Historic Places
- Location within Iowa Location within the United States
- Location: 4215 Main St. Elk Horn, Iowa
- Coordinates: 41°35′32.86″N 95°03′34.66″W
- Area: less than one acre
- Built: 1908
- MPS: Ethnic Historic Settlement of Shelby and Audubon Counties MPS
- NRHP reference No.: 91001456
- Added to NRHP: October 3, 1991

The Chris Larsen House is a historic residence located in Elk Horn, Iowa, United States. It was listed on the National Register of Historic Places in 1991. The historic importance of the house is its association with Danish immigration into Shelby and Audubon counties from 1865 to 1924. It is also the best example in the area of the frame, gabled double-pile house type. It follows a basic foursquare plan with a broad eave-front gabled roof with a broad central gabled dormer, and symmetrical fenestration on the facade. This type of house construction was popular in the local Danish immigrant community from the 1890s into the 1910s. Chris Larsen, who had this house built in 1908, was a local merchant who immigrated to the United States in 1890. He and his wife Amanda had three children, and they had several boarders living with them as well.
