= Smith-Larsen House =

- U.S. National Register of Historic Places
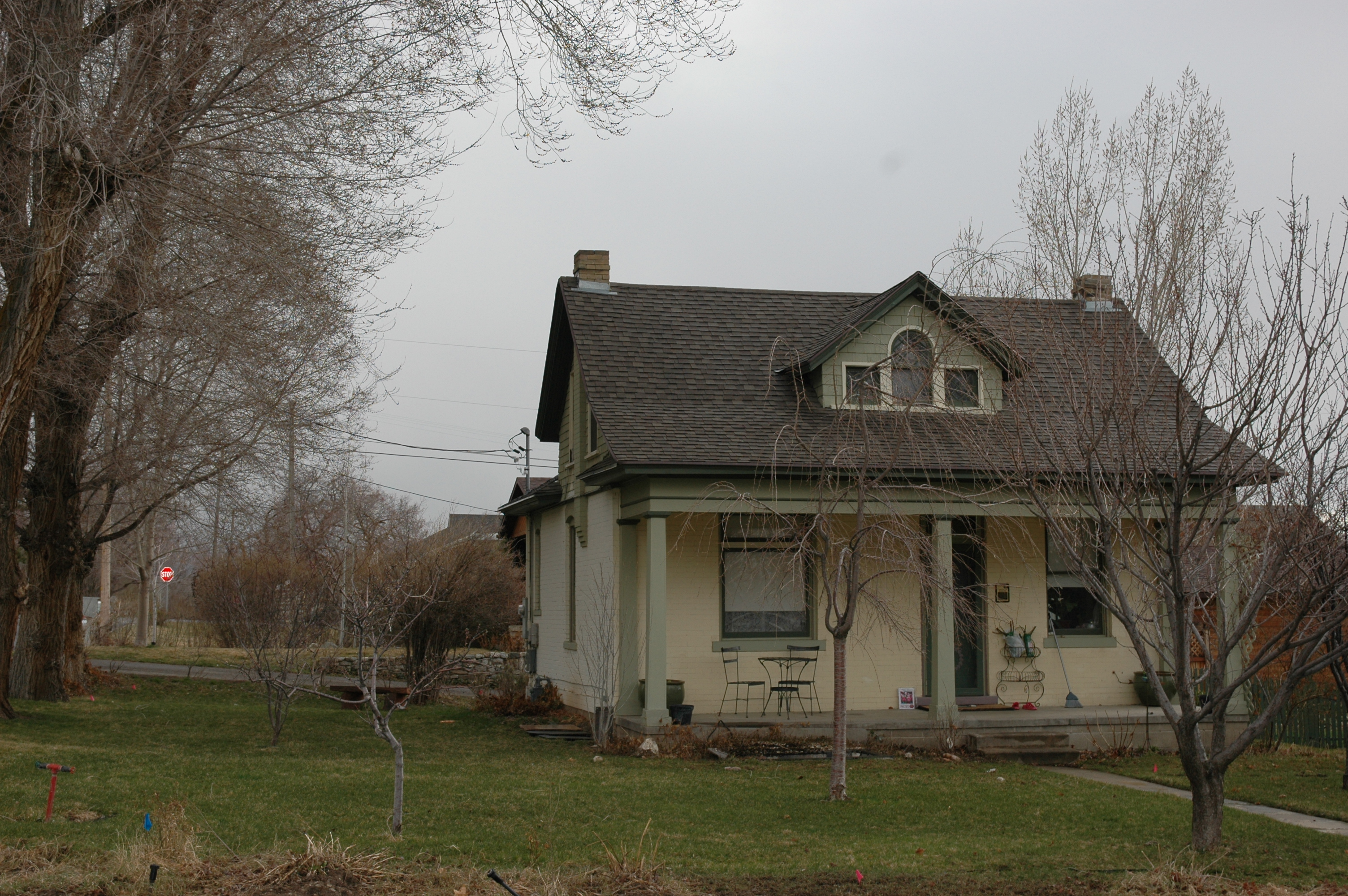

- Location within Utah
- Location: 280 E. Center St., Centerville, Utah
- Coordinates: 40°54′59″N 111°52′27″W
- Area: less than one acre
- Built: c.1886, c.1911
- Architectural style: Late Victorian
- MPS: Centerville MPS
- NRHP reference No.: 97001320
- Added to NRHP: November 17, 1997

The Smith-Larsen House, located at 280 E. Center St. in Centerville, Utah, was listed on the National Register of Historic Places in 1997.

The one-and-a-half-story brick house was initially built in the Victorian style around 1886. Around 1911, it was modified into a bungalow style with the addition of a front porch, a front dormer with a Palladian window, shingles on its upper story, and double-hung windows.
