= Aage and Kristine Larsen Homestead =

Historic house in Montana, United States

- Aage and Kirstine Larsen Homestead
- U.S. National Register of Historic Places
- Location within Montana Location within the United States
- Location: County Highway 516 north of Dagmar, Montana
- Coordinates: 48°37′46″N 104°11′14″W
- Area: 4 acres (1.6 ha)
- Built: 1908
- MPS: Sheridan County MPS
- NRHP reference No.: 93001146
- Added to NRHP: October 27, 1993

The Aage and Kirstine Larsen Homestead was listed on the United States National Register of Historic Places in 1993. It was deemed significant as a well-preserved example of an early twentieth-century Sheridan County homestead which achieved a measure of success and permanence. The Larsens were among the thousands of settlers who arrived in Sheridan County during the first two decades of the twentieth century, and the homestead they established was initially typical of hundreds of such farms operated during the county's early years of settlement. Most of these early homesteads were either abandoned or merged into larger farm operations, in either case leaving relatively few physical remains. The relative economic success achieved by the Larsens, however, allowed them to expand their farm holdings and increase the number and size of the farm's buildings, resulting in the building complex which survives today.

The farm was started in 1908 by Aage T. Larsen (1885-1948), who immigrated to the United States from Denmark in 1905. He first built a 12 by 12 feet (3.7 m × 3.7 m) shack made of lumber carried by hand from the railroad at Culbertson. Kirstine Kleis married Aage in 1910. They grew wheat, owned and operated a steam-powered custom threshing unit, and they raised cattle. Aage "was a civic leader in the Dagmar community and served in the Montana state legislature from 1921 to 1923."

It was the farming homestead of the Larsen family from 1908 to 1924. The listing included six contributing buildings:

- a one-and-a-half-story, wood-frame house
- a one-and-a-half-story gabled barn located about 130 feet (40 m) away,
- a shed wing addition to the barn with a further shed-roofed chicken coop off the addition
- a granary with cupola that appears to have originally been built as a small barn and then was later enlarged
- a wood-frame garage with two garage door openings (without doors, as of 1992)
- a livestock shed

The property also had two round metal grain bins which are modern and were deemed to be non-contributing.

As of 1992 the property was abandoned, as seen in photos taken then and included in its NRHP nomination.
