= Neils Peter Larsen House =

Historic house in Utah, United States

- U.S. National Register of Historic Places
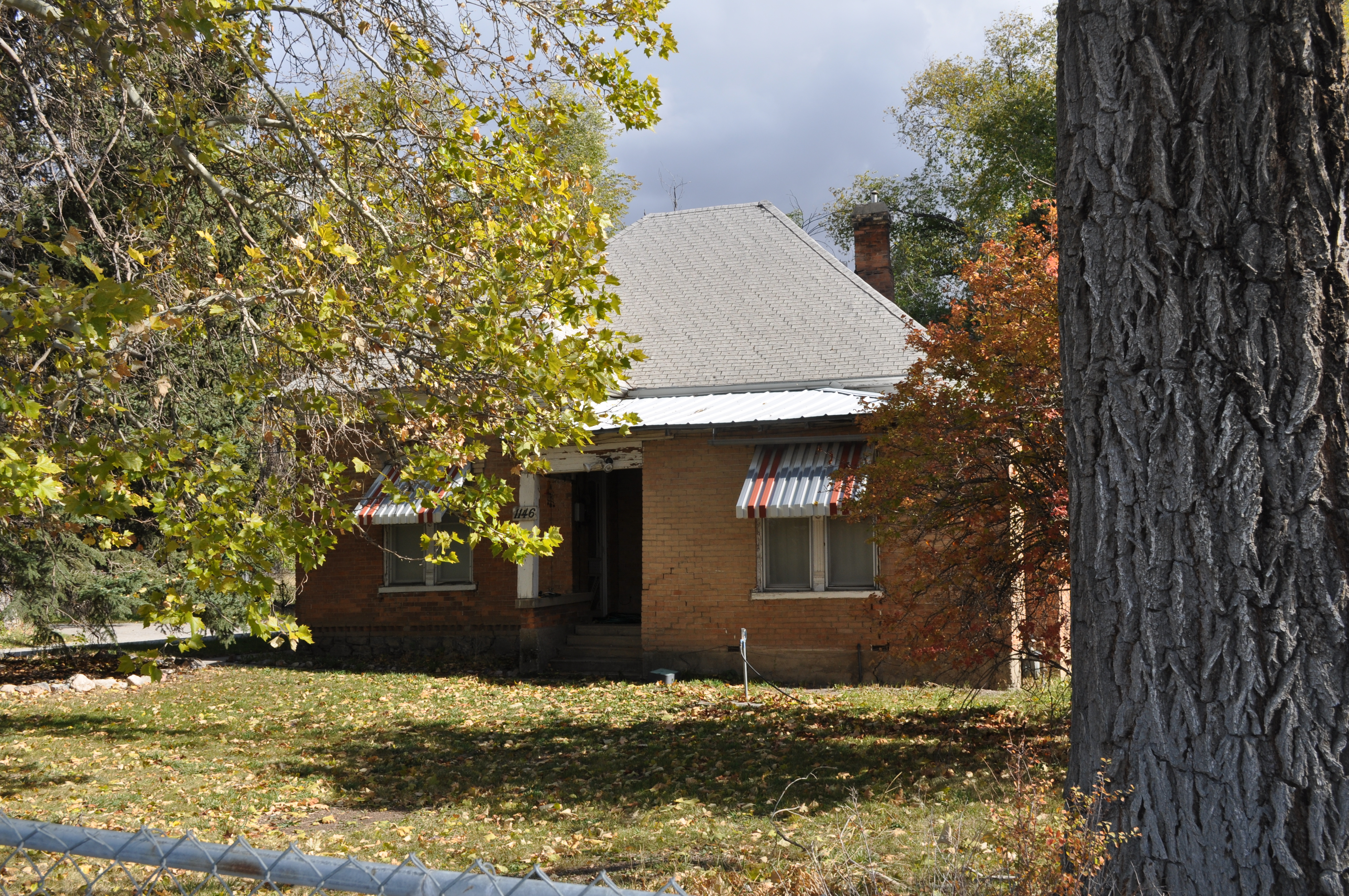

- Location within Utah Location within the United States
- Location: 1146 N 100 E, Pleasant Grove, Utah
- Coordinates: 40°22′35″N 111°44′18″W
- Area: less than one acre
- Built: 1870
- MPS: Pleasant Grove Soft-Rock Buildings TR
- NRHP reference No.: 87000829
- Added to NRHP: June 9, 1987

The Neils Peter Larsen House, at 1146 N 100 E Pleasant Grove, Utah, was built in 1870. It is a soft rock house built to replace use of a dugout. Neils Peter Larsen had homesteaded a farm in 1862. The dugout and house served one of Larsen's three polygamous wives and a family; the other two wives and one family lived about a mile away.

The house was listed on the National Register of Historic Places in 1987.

== See also ==
- Christen Larsen House, also NRHP-listed in Pleasant Grove
