= Larsen Family House =

- U.S. National Register of Historic Places
- Location within California
- Location: 84 State St., Willits, California
- Coordinates: 39°24′49″N 123°21′09″W
- Area: less than one acre
- Built: 1904
- Architectural style: Queen Anne
- NRHP reference No.: 95001153
- Added to NRHP: October 5, 1995

The Larsen Family House, at 84 State St. in Willits, California, in Mendocino County was built in 1904. It was listed on the National Register of Historic Places in 1995.

It is Queen Anne in style.

In 1994, it was occupied by Kimberly's Jewelry.
