= Samuel Pierce Hoyt =

American merchant and farmer

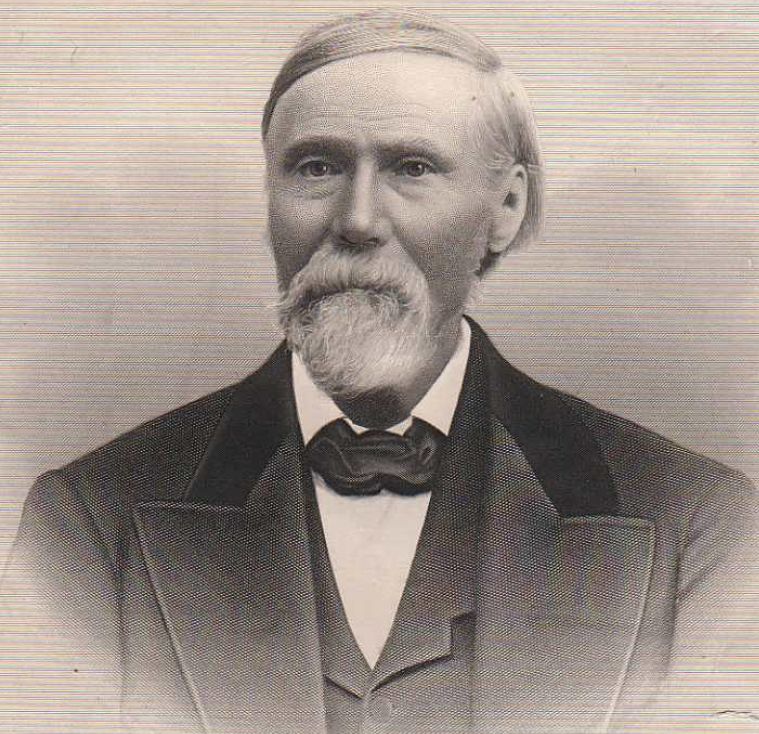
- Born: November 21, 1807; Chester, New Hampshire
- Died: August 12, 1889 (aged 81); Summit County, Utah
- Burial place: Hoytsville Cemetery, Hoytsville, Utah; 40°52'28.6"N 111°22'37.8"W
- Occupations: Farmer, merchant, and postmaster
- Spouses: Catharine Emma Burbidge (m. 1856–1889) Emily Smith (m. 1834–1889)
- Parent(s): James Hoyt and Pamelia Ann Brown

Samuel Pierce Hoyt (1807–1889) was an American merchant and farmer. He was the county commissioner of Summit County, Utah. Hoyt is the name sake for Hoytsville, Utah. He built the first flour mill in Summit County. He also was important for making Fillmore the state capital. Today it is Salt Lake City.

== Early life ==
Hoyt was born on November 21, 1807, in Chester, New Hampshire and was the first child born to James Hoyt and Pamelia Ann Brown. He was born and raised in Rockingham County, New Hampshire, and was married in 1834 in Tunbridge, Vermont, to Emily Smith. He later converted to the Church of Jesus Christ of Latter-day Saints. In 1848 his father died.

== Making Fillmore the state capital ==
Samuel Hoyt then relocated to Nauvoo, Illinois, and in 1851 moved to Fillmore, Utah, a town in Millard County. When he got there the town was growing in population and the settlers were building Fort Fillmore and the statehouse. Bishop Noah Bartholomew sent letters to Salt Lake informing them that the population was growing. Later Brigham Young appointed Hoyt as being responsible for reporting updates to church leader George A. Smith. Construction of a capital building began around 1852, of which Hoyt was involved. However, by 1856 only the south wing had been completed. In this year, he married his second wife, Emma Burbidge.

== Summit County ==
In May 1861, Brigham Young instructed Hoyt and his wife Emily to locate between Coalville and Wanship in a place called Unionville. Hoyt came to Summit County later that year. During the Utah Black Hawk War, Unionville built a fort to protect settlers from Native American attackers.

=== Hoytsville Mansion ===
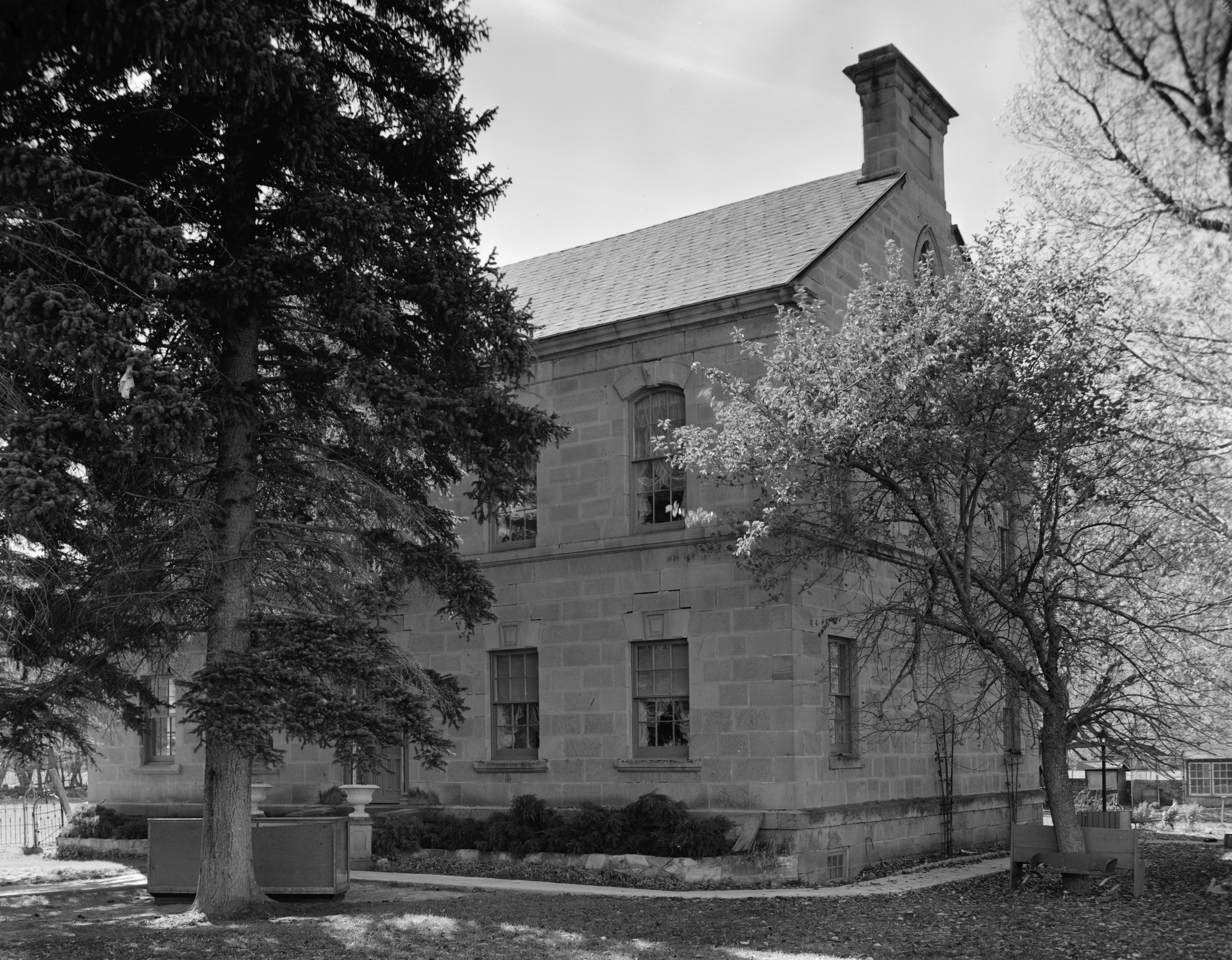
The Hoyt Mansion in 1968

In 1862 Hoyt built a gristmill, the first in the county. Today the mill is still standing but some of the structure has collapsed. In 1863 he started work on his home, the Hoyt Mansion, using sandstone quarried from mountains to the east of the town. Construction of the mansion and its accompanying structures offered employment to many local people struggling to make homes in the village. Many years were spent on the stonework, while the interior painting, consisting of 7 layers of paint, took around two years to complete for the contractor C. M. Olsen. The total cost of the mansion, prior to plastering or painting was estimated around $1,000 per foot, regarded as an "enormous sum" of the time. Construction was concluded in 1870. The Hoyt family ran the post office from their home. His wife Emily Smith taught school in the house to local children and continued to do so until her death. It is a 2 1/2-story Georgian style building that is listed in the National Register of Historic Places. In 1957, the house was purchased by the Crittenden family and was recorded by the Historic American Building survey in 1968 as being regarded "one of the most elegant 19th century homes in Utah".

=== Later years and death ===
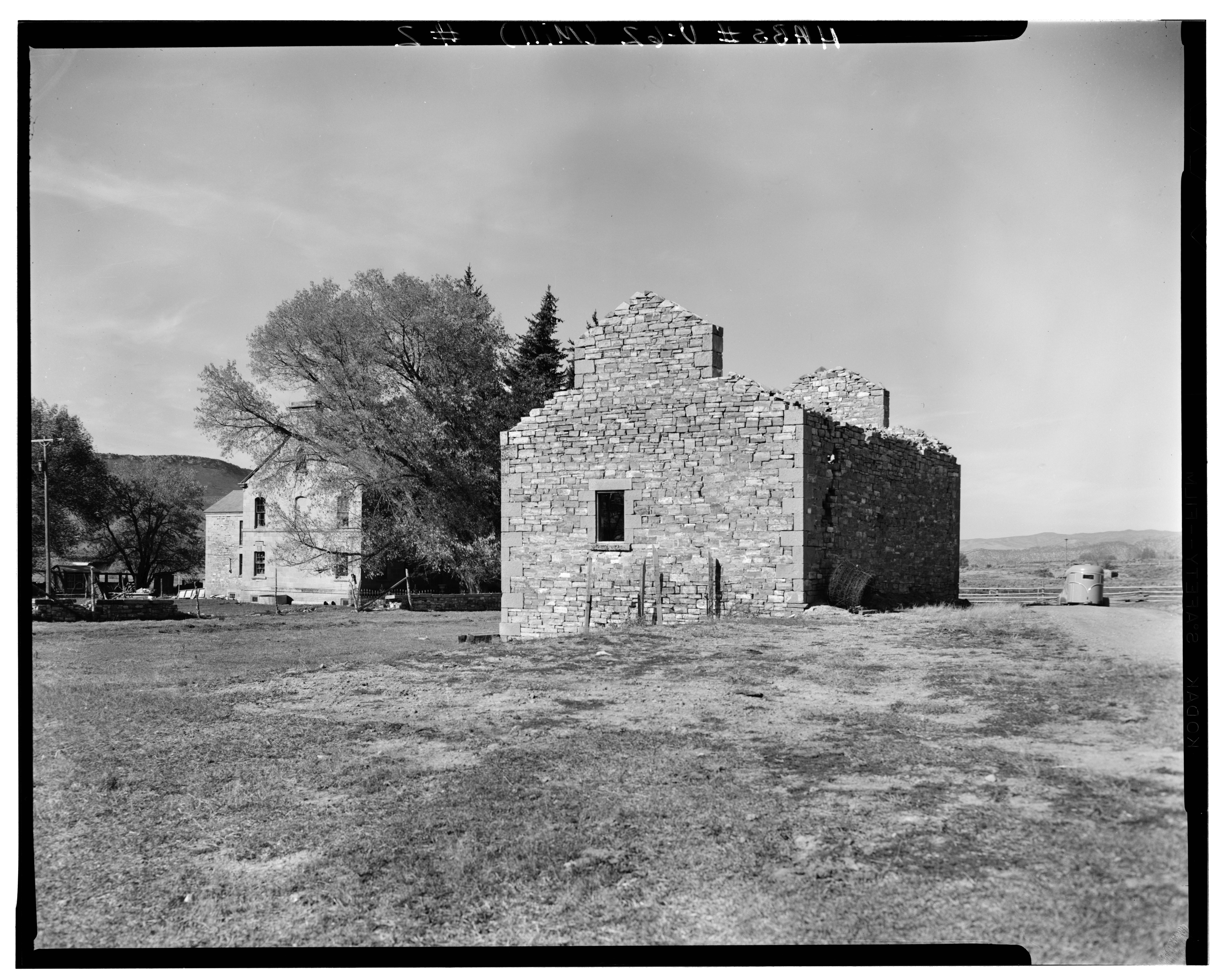
Hoytsville Flour Mill, 1968

In the late 1860s, he owned a ranch in Marion, a town near Kamas, where the last years of his life were spent. On August 12, 1889, he died on his ranch and was buried in the Hoytsville cemetery. After his death, his second wife Emma maintained the ranch, while his first wife Emily resided in the mansion. They renamed Unionville to Hoytsville in his honor.

== Legacy ==
Today, Samuel P. Hoyt is known for being the namesake of Hoytsville and being a prominent settler of Summit County. He was credited "without question" as having done "more than any other man" to establish sound economic foundations on the land which would later bear his name. In 2022 Hoyt was included on the mural for the Summit County Public Works building. By the year 1874, the town had been renamed Hoytsville.
