= Samuel P. Hoyt House =

Historic house in Utah, United States

- U.S. National Register of Historic Places
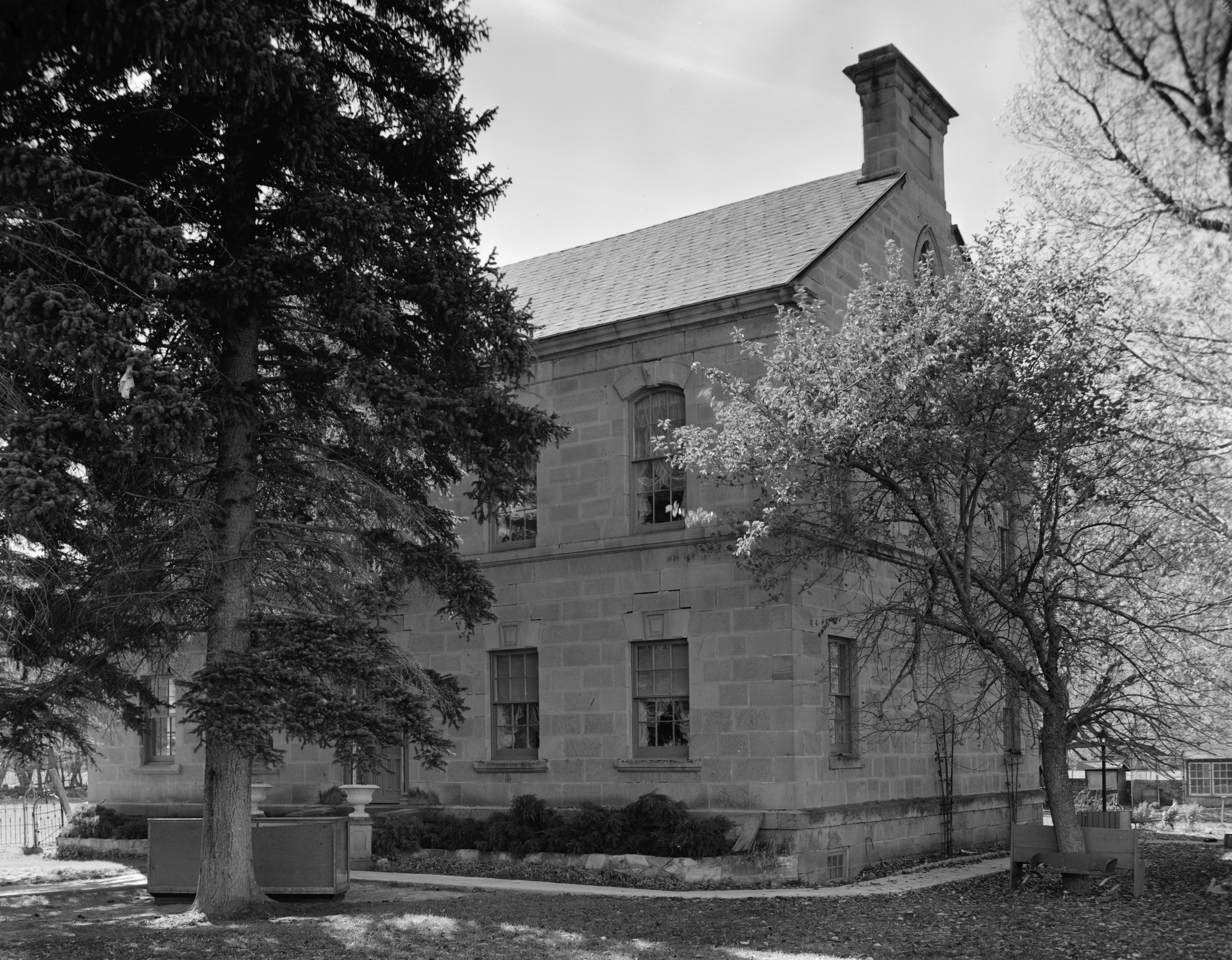
- The Hoyt House in 1968

- Location within Utah Location within the United States
- Location: Off I-80, Hoytsville, Utah
- Coordinates: 40°52′18″N 111°23′4″W
- Area: 5 acres (2.0 ha)
- Built: 1863
- Architectural style: Georgian
- NRHP reference No.: 82004163
- Added to NRHP: April 19, 1982

The Samuel P. Hoyt House was built starting in 1863 in Hoytsville, Utah. Never fully completed, work stopped in 1870. The house is significant as the home of a prominent early settler, of unusually large and elaborate construction for the time and place.

== History ==
Samuel Pierce Hoyt was born in Chester, New Hampshire on November 21, 1807. In 1834 he married Emily Smith. An acquaintance of Joseph Smith, he converted to the Church of the Latter Day Saints in 1834. After a spell in Massachusetts the Hoyts moved to Utah in 1851, joining with the Church of Jesus Christ of Latter-day Saints. In Utah, Hoyt was involved in the building of the proposed territorial capitol in Fillmore. He married his second wife, Emma Bumbridge, in 1856. In 1861 Hoyt moved to Summit County, building a gristmill in 1862. In 1863 he started work on the house. In the late 1860s he established a ranch near Kamas, where his second wife resided and where Hoyt spent the last years of his life, his first wife remaining in the house in Hoytsville. Hoyt died on August 12, 1889. In 1957 the house was purchased by George Carroll Crittenden and his wife, Luella Nicholas Crittenden. The Crittendens began restoration on and resided in the house.

== Description ==
The Hoyt House is a 2 1/2-story house in the Georgian style, built in dressed and coursed ashlar sandstone. According to its entry on the National Register of Historic Places, it is the finest example of Georgian-style architecture in Utah. It has a center-passage double-pile plan, two rooms deep, five bays across the front. The hall ends at a formal dining room, and is flanked by sitting and service rooms. The house has 14 rooms, nine of them with fireplaces. The main living level features murals by a local artist named Olson. A full basement includes a well, near the basement kitchen, which in turn was connected to the upstairs by a dumbwaiter.

The Samuel P. Hoyt House was placed on the National Register of Historic Places on April 19, 1982.
