= Watkins-Tholman-Larsen Farmstead =

- U.S. National Register of Historic Places
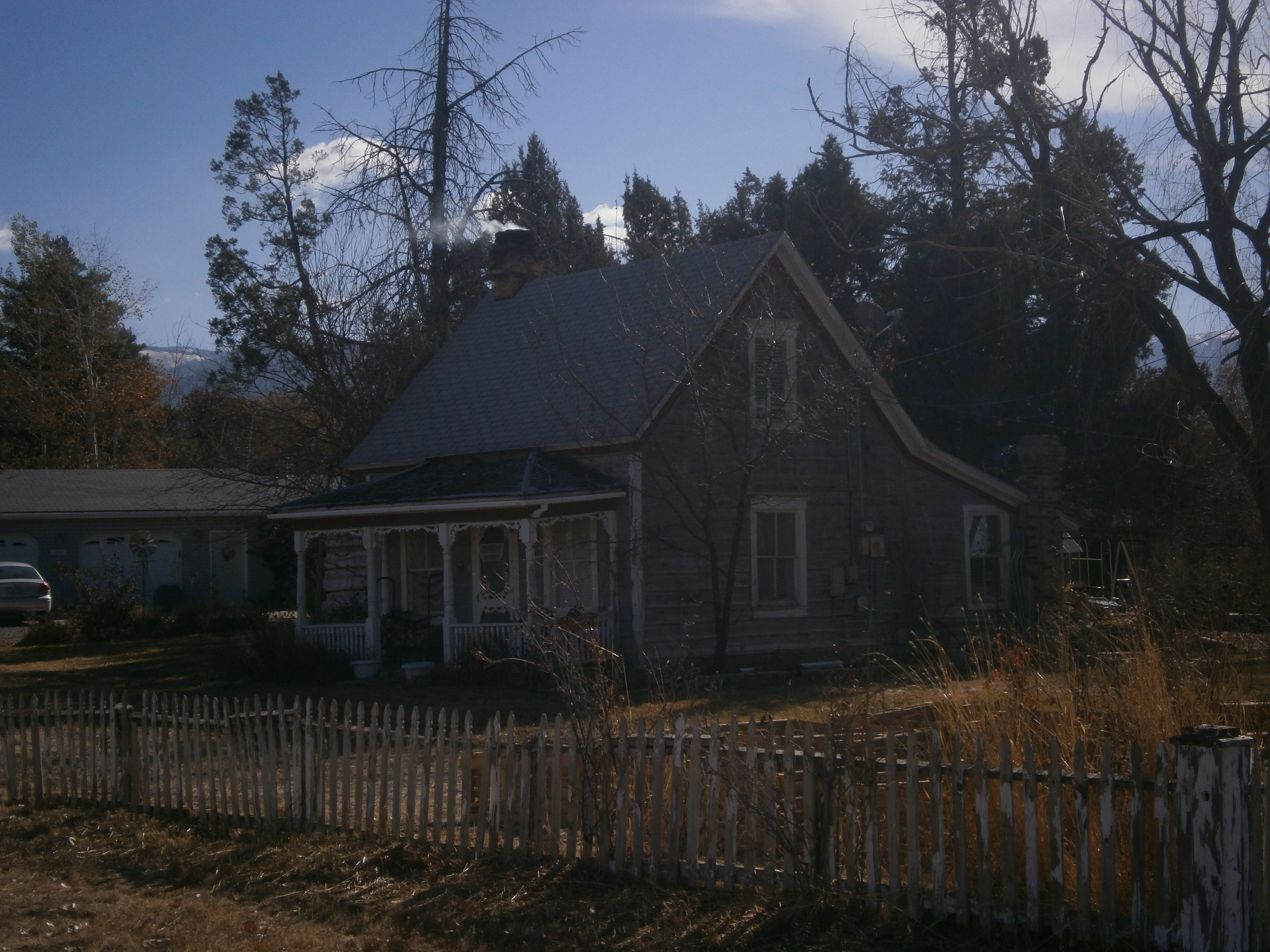

- Location within Utah Location within the United States
- Location: 422 E. 400 South St., Mt. Pleasant, Utah
- Coordinates: 39.540663°N 111.447366°W
- Area: 1.1 acres (0.45 ha)
- Built: c.1870
- Built by: Watkins, Thomas; Tholman, John
- NRHP reference No.: 96001531
- Added to NRHP: December 27, 1996

The Watkins-Tholman-Larsen Farmstead, at 422 E. 400 South St. in Mt. Pleasant, Utah, was built around 1870. It was listed on the National Register of Historic Places in 1996. The listing includes five contributing buildings.

It was built by Thomas Watkins and John Tholman. The homestead was established around 1870, and its one-and-a-half-story clapboard-sided log house was built around then, though the granary might have been built first and occupied by the family until the log house was completed. There are also a log and stone barn (c. 1880s), a wood blacksmith shop (c. 1880s), and a stone chicken coop (c. 1880s). The property has a historic picket fence along its street edge.
