= Hoytsville, Utah =

- CDP
- Location in Summit County and the state of Utah
- Coordinates: 40°52′27″N 111°22′42″W
- Country: United States
- State: Utah
- County: Summit
- Settled: 1859
- Founder: Thomas Bradberry
- Named for: Samuel P. Hoyt
- Elevation: 5,706 ft (1,739 m)

Population (2020)
  - Total: 702
- Time zone: UTC-7 (Mountain (MST))
  - Summer (DST): UTC-6 (MDT)
- ZIP code: 84017
- Area code: 435
- GNIS feature ID: 2584768

Hoytsville is a census-designated place in western Summit County, Utah, United States. Hoytsville is named for early settler Samuel P. Hoyt. It is bordered by Coalville to the north, and by Wanship on the south. The population was 702 at the 2020 census. Interstate 80 passes through the area, as well as the Weber River. Hoytsville is home to a large chapel of the Church of Jesus Christ of Latter-day Saints, a cemetery, and a handful of businesses and farms. Farmers primarily focus on dairy farming, beef ranching, and raising sheep for wool. In the past, mink were also raised although that industry has declined in recent years.

Hoytsville is also the site of the Hoyt Mansion, considered by the Summit County Historical Society as "one of the most elegant 19th Century homes still standing in Utah today."

== History ==
In 1859, Thomas Bradberry and others settled along the Weber River in the area of Hoytsville. The settlement was first known as East Plymouth. During the Utah Black Hawk War, the settlers united to build a fort for protection, the foundation of which is easily identifiable in Hoytsville today. The settlement was subsequently named Unionville. In 1863, Samuel P. Hoyt built the first flour mill in Summit County. He also ran the local post office from his house. The settlement was renamed Hoytsville in his honor.

The Mormon chapel in Hoytsville is the site of Historical Marker #37 of the Daughters of Utah Pioneers, which was erected on August 27, 1938. The plaque reads:

"OLD FORT AND HOYT GRIST MILL This monument is near the site of the old fort, 300 ft. So. West of here. It was on Old Emigrant Trail. Route also used by overland stage and part of Johnston's Army going East in 1861, to participate in the Civil War. The fort was built during the Black Hawk War in 1866, on advice of Pres. Brigham Young to Bishop Winters. 25 families moved their log cabins there. Centrally located it provided protection for families, livestock and grist mill. The mill was the first in this county. Built in 1862 by Samual P. Hoyt."

== Demographics ==
Historical population
Census	Pop.	Note	%±
2010	607		—
2020	702		15.7%

As of the census of 2010, there were 607 people living in the CDP. There were 225 housing units. The racial makeup of the town was 90.4% White, 0.3% Black or African American, 0.3% American Indian and Alaska Native, 0.2% Asian, 0.2% Native Hawaiian and Other Pacific Islander, 7.2% some other race, and 1.3% from two or more races. Hispanic or Latino of any race were 10.5% of the population.

== Education ==
It is in the North Summit School District.

== See also ==
- List of census-designated places in Utah
