= Ephraim, Utah =

City in Utah, United States

- City
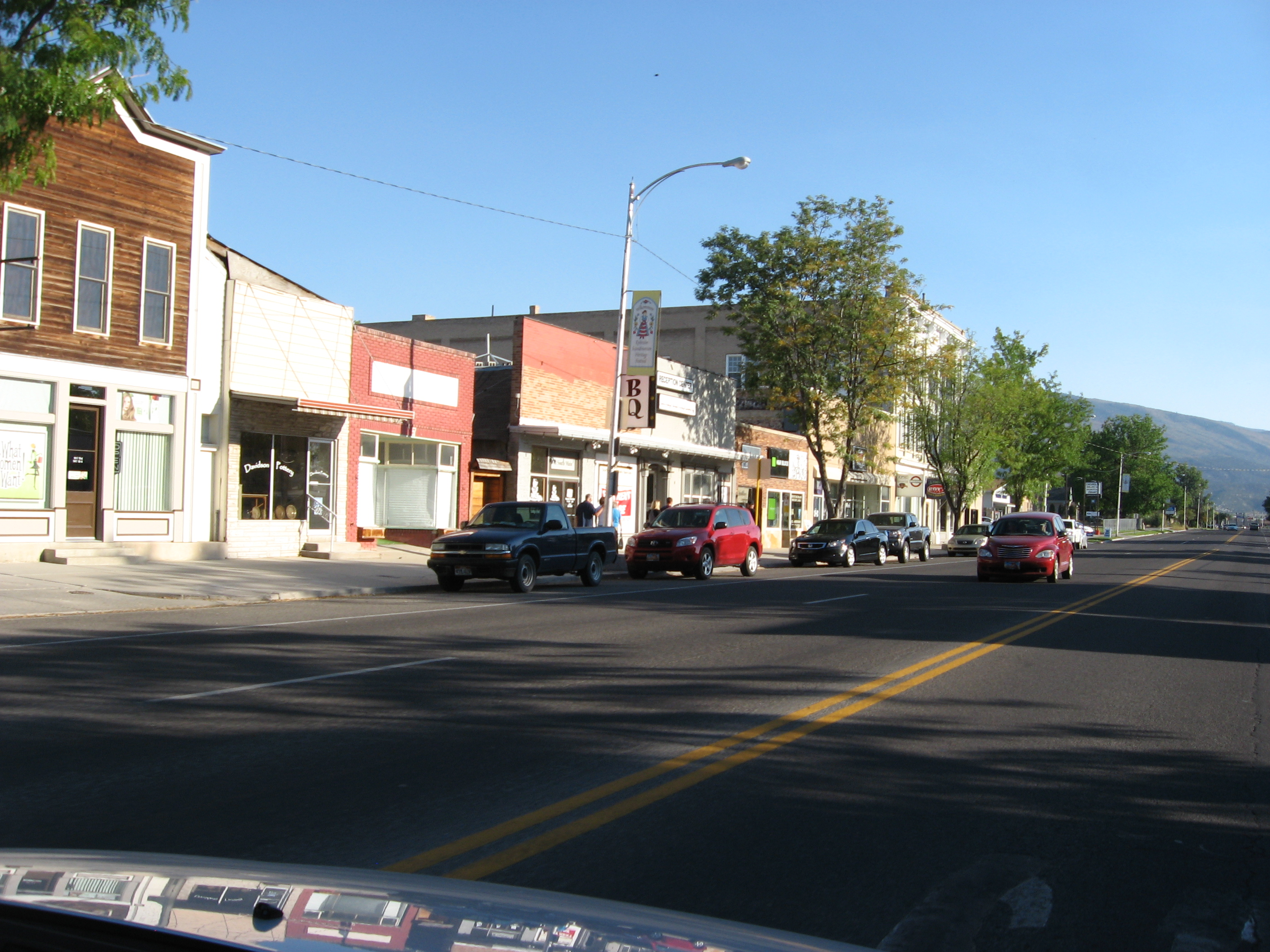
- Shops in Ephraim, Utah

- Flag
- Interactive map of Ephraim, Utah
- Location within Utah Location within the United States
- Coordinates: 39°21′29″N 111°35′2″W
- Country: United States
- State: Utah
- County: Sanpete
- Founded: 1854
- Named for: Ephraim

Government
  - Mayor: John Scott
  - City Council: Margie Anderson; Anthony Beal; Dennis Nordfelt; Lloyd Stevens; Chad Parry

Area
  - Total: 4.38 sq mi (11.34 km^{2})
  - Land: 4.38 sq mi (11.34 km^{2})
  - Water: 0 sq mi (0.00 km^{2})
- Elevation: 5,542 ft (1,689 m)

Population (2020)
  - Total: 5,611
  - Density: 1,282/sq mi (494.8/km^{2})
- Time zone: UTC-7 (Mountain (MST))
  - Summer (DST): UTC-6 (MDT)
- ZIP code: 84627
- Area code: 435
- FIPS code: 49-23530
- GNIS feature ID: 1440944
- Website: www.ephraim.gov

Ephraim is a city in Sanpete County, Utah, United States. The population was 5,611 at the 2020 census, making it the largest city in Sanpete County. It is the location of Snow College and is located along U.S. Route 89.

== History ==
The first settlement at Ephraim was made in 1854. A post office called Ephraim has been in operation since 1856. The town was named after Ephraim of the Old Testament.

== Geography ==
Ephraim is located in the Sanpete Valley, on the east side of the San Pitch River.

According to the United States Census Bureau, the city has a total area of 3.6 square miles (9.2 km^{2}), all land.

== Demographics ==
Historical population
Census	Pop.	Note	%±
1860	910		—
1870	1,167		28.2%
1880	1,764		51.2%
1890	1,917		8.7%
1900	2,086		8.8%
1910	2,296		10.1%
1920	2,287		−0.4%
1930	2,076		−9.2%
1940	2,143		3.2%
1950	1,987		−7.3%
1960	1,801		−9.4%
1970	2,127		18.1%
1980	2,810		32.1%
1990	3,363		19.7%
2000	4,505		34.0%
2010	6,135		36.2%
2020	5,611		−8.5%
2022 (est.)	5,937		5.8%
U.S. Decennial Census

=== 2020 census ===
As of the 2020 census, Ephraim had a population of 5,611. The median age was 22.9 years. 26.9% of residents were under the age of 18 and 11.3% of residents were 65 years of age or older. For every 100 females there were 98.6 males, and for every 100 females age 18 and over there were 99.9 males age 18 and over.

90.0% of residents lived in urban areas, while 10.0% lived in rural areas.

There were 1,587 households in Ephraim, of which 39.6% had children under the age of 18 living in them. Of all households, 56.8% were married-couple households, 17.5% were households with a male householder and no spouse or partner present, and 22.8% were households with a female householder and no spouse or partner present. About 21.3% of all households were made up of individuals and 9.1% had someone living alone who was 65 years of age or older.

There were 1,845 housing units, of which 14.0% were vacant. The homeowner vacancy rate was 1.2% and the rental vacancy rate was 10.3%.

Racial composition as of the 2020 census
Race	Number	Percent
White	4,534	80.8%
Black or African American	40	0.7%
American Indian and Alaska Native	63	1.1%
Asian	51	0.9%
Native Hawaiian and Other Pacific Islander	138	2.5%
Some other race	518	9.2%
Two or more races	267	4.8%
Hispanic or Latino (of any race)	784	14.0%

=== 2000 census ===
As of the 2000 census, there were 4,505 people, 1,128 households, and 753 families residing in the city. The population density was 1,262.4 people per square mile (487.2/km^{2}). There were 1,275 housing units at an average density of 357.3 per square mile (137.9/km^{2}). The racial makeup of the city was 89.23% White, 0.38% African American, 0.38% Native American, 1.29% Asian, 0.53% Pacific Islander, 6.86% from other races, and 1.33% from two or more races. Hispanic or Latino of any race were 9.86% of the population.

There were 1,128 households, out of which 38.7% had children under 18 living with them, 55.8% were married couples living together, 7.4% had a female householder with no husband present, and 33.2% were non-families. 14.6% of all households were made up of individuals, and 7.6% had someone living alone who was 65 years or older. The average household size was 3.59 people, and the average family size was 3.71 people.

In the city, the population was spread out, with 24.9% under 18, 42.4% from 18 to 24, 14.0% from 25 to 44, 12.3% from 45 to 64, and 6.5% who were 65 years of age or older. The median age was 20 years. For every 100 females, there were 80.9 males. For every 100 females aged 18 and over, there were 73.3 males.

The median income for a household in the city was $28,318, and the median income for a family was $35,568. Males had a median income of $28,421 versus $21,042 for females. The per capita income for the city was $9,624. About 12.3% of families and 31.0% of the population were below the poverty line, including 13.0% of those under age 18 and 7.8% of those aged 65 or over.

== Education ==
Ephraim is located in the South Sanpete School District, and has Ephraim Elementary School and Ephraim Middle School. High school students attend Manti High School in nearby Manti.

Ephraim is also the location of Snow College, which was founded in 1888 as the LDS Sanpete Stake Academy. It was later renamed Snow Academy in honor of Erastus Snow and his distant cousin, LDS president, Lorenzo Snow, and finally, to Snow College in 1923. Ownership of the college was transferred to Utah in 1932. Current enrollment is around 5,900, some of whom attend the Richfield campus. Utah State University operates a branch campus in Ephraim that offers Bachelors's and Graduate Degrees.

== Climate ==
According to the Köppen Climate Classification system, Ephraim has a semi-arid climate, abbreviated "BSk" on climate maps. The data below are from the Western Regional Climate Center over the years 1949 to 2016.

Climate data for Ephraim, UT
Month	Jan	Feb	Mar	Apr	May	Jun	Jul	Aug	Sep	Oct	Nov	Dec	Year
Record high °F (°C)	60 (16)	70 (21)	85 (29)	88 (31)	99 (37)	102 (39)	108 (42)	104 (40)	97 (36)	90 (32)	76 (24)	66 (19)	108 (42)
Mean daily maximum °F (°C)	35.6 (2.0)	41.1 (5.1)	59.2 (15.1)	59.2 (15.1)	69.9 (21.1)	81.3 (27.4)	89.5 (31.9)	87.1 (30.6)	77.8 (25.4)	65.2 (18.4)	49.1 (9.5)	37.0 (2.8)	62.7 (17.0)
Mean daily minimum °F (°C)	12.8 (−10.7)	18.5 (−7.5)	25.2 (−3.8)	31.6 (−0.2)	38.9 (3.8)	46.4 (8.0)	53.8 (12.1)	52.1 (11.2)	43.3 (6.3)	33.4 (0.8)	23.4 (−4.8)	14.4 (−9.8)	32.8 (0.4)
Record low °F (°C)	−28 (−33)	−20 (−29)	−9 (−23)	9 (−13)	18 (−8)	26 (−3)	34 (1)	29 (−2)	16 (−9)	12 (−11)	−19 (−28)	−34 (−37)	−34 (−37)
Average precipitation inches (mm)	0.92 (23)	1.02 (26)	1.19 (30)	1.13 (29)	1.10 (28)	0.69 (18)	0.69 (18)	0.78 (20)	1.02 (26)	1.12 (28)	0.93 (24)	1.06 (27)	11.65 (297)
Average snowfall inches (cm)	2.9 (7.4)	2.1 (5.3)	1.7 (4.3)	0.6 (1.5)	0.1 (0.25)	0 (0)	0 (0)	0 (0)	0 (0)	0 (0)	0.7 (1.8)	4.9 (12)	13 (32.55)
Source: https://wrcc.dri.edu/cgi-bin/cliMAIN.pl?ut2578

== Notable people ==
- Jon Cox, political advisor and former member of the Utah House of Representatives
- Linnie Findlay, historian
- Kay Mortensen, retired American professor
- Richard Nibley, violinist, composer, and educator
- Matt Warner, outlaw, rancher, cowboy and lawman

== See also ==
- List of cities and towns in Utah
- Manti, Utah
