= Elevated Transit =

Former intercity bus transportation company in Utah, United States

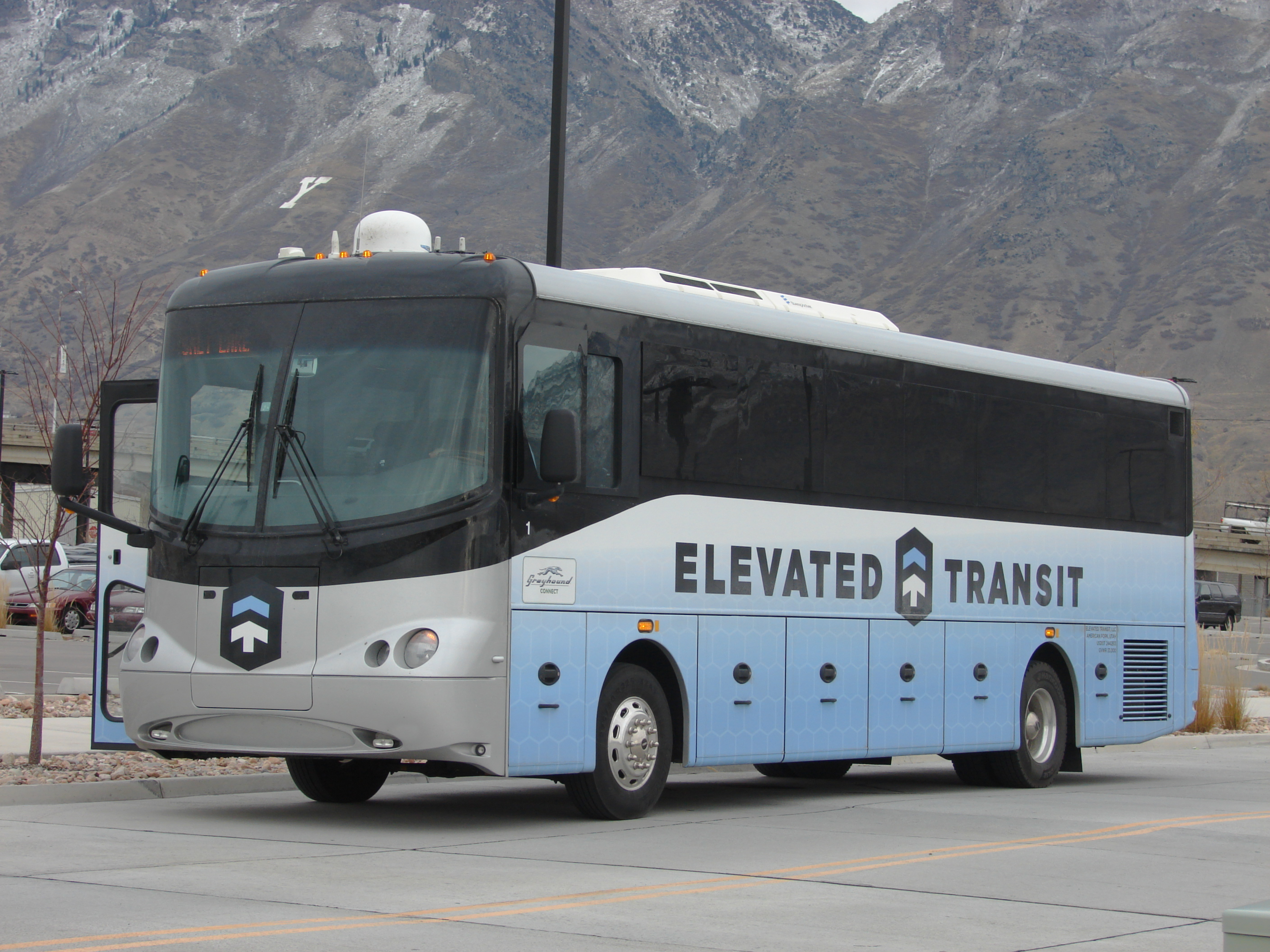
- An Elevated Transit bus at the Provo Intermodal Center
- Parent: Wasatch Transportation
- Founded: 2 October 2013
- Commenced operation: 13 August 2014
- Ceased operation: 1 June 2017
- Headquarters: 42 North 100 East, Suite 1 American Fork, Utah 84003; United States (888) ELEVATE (353-8283)
- Service area: Central, Eastern, and Southeastern Utah
- Service type: Coach
- Alliance: Part of Greyhound Connect
- Routes: 2
- Stops: Central Utah Correctional Facility; Manti Utah LDS Temple; Monticello Utah LDS Temple; Provo Intermodal Center; Salt Lake City Intermodal Hub; Salt Lake City International Airport; Snow College; Utah State University Eastern; Utah State University Eastern-San Juan Campus
- Destinations: Blanding; Centerfield; Ephraim; Fairview; Green River; Gunnison; Manti; Moab; Monticello; Moroni; Mount Pleasant; Nephi; Price; Provo; Richfield; Salina; Salt Lake City; Spanish Fork
- Fleet: 3 Glaval Synergy buses 3 Thomas HDX buses
- Chief executive: Steven Fuller
- Website: elevatedtransit.com

Elevated Transit was a regional intercity bus company in Utah, United States. The company stopped offering regular bus service on June 1, 2017. It formerly connected the central, eastern, and southeastern areas of the state (Carbon, Grand, Emery, Juab, San Juan, Sanpete, and Sevier counties) with the Wasatch Front, specifically Provo and Salt Lake City. It is a wholly owned subsidiary of Wasatch Transportation and is an official Greyhound Connect company.

== Description ==
Elevated Transit provided daily routes in both directions throughout its service area, plus some additional roundtrip runs Thursday through Monday. Its headquarters were at 42 North 100 East, Suite 1 in American Fork. Its parent company, Wasatch Transportation, had (as of 2016) been in operating in Utah for nearly 30 years, but specialized in special needs and school transportation. Elevated Transit's slogan was Travel the HIGH way. Seating was first-come, first-served and smoking was prohibited on Elevated Transit vehicles.

The bus line was created to provide bus service to the central, eastern, and southeastern areas of the state that previously lacked public transportation. It began operating with substantial financial support from the Utah Department of Transportation (UDOT) and Greyhound Lines. (Note: Due to the financial support received and contracts involved, both the Utah Department of Transportation (UDOT) and Greyhound maintain oversight of the fares assessed and route schedules Elevated Transit.) Between UDOT and Greyhound, Elevated Transit received $864,000 per year for its first five years of operation. According to CEO Steven Fuller, it was hoped that the initial funding will allow the company to grow "to the point that public funds are no longer needed and it will self-sustain." The service was intended to connect with existing Greyhound service, as well as other transit systems along the routes.

In 2017, Utah’s Department of Transport withdrew funding therefore effectively ending those services relying on public subsidy.

=== Former Fleet ===
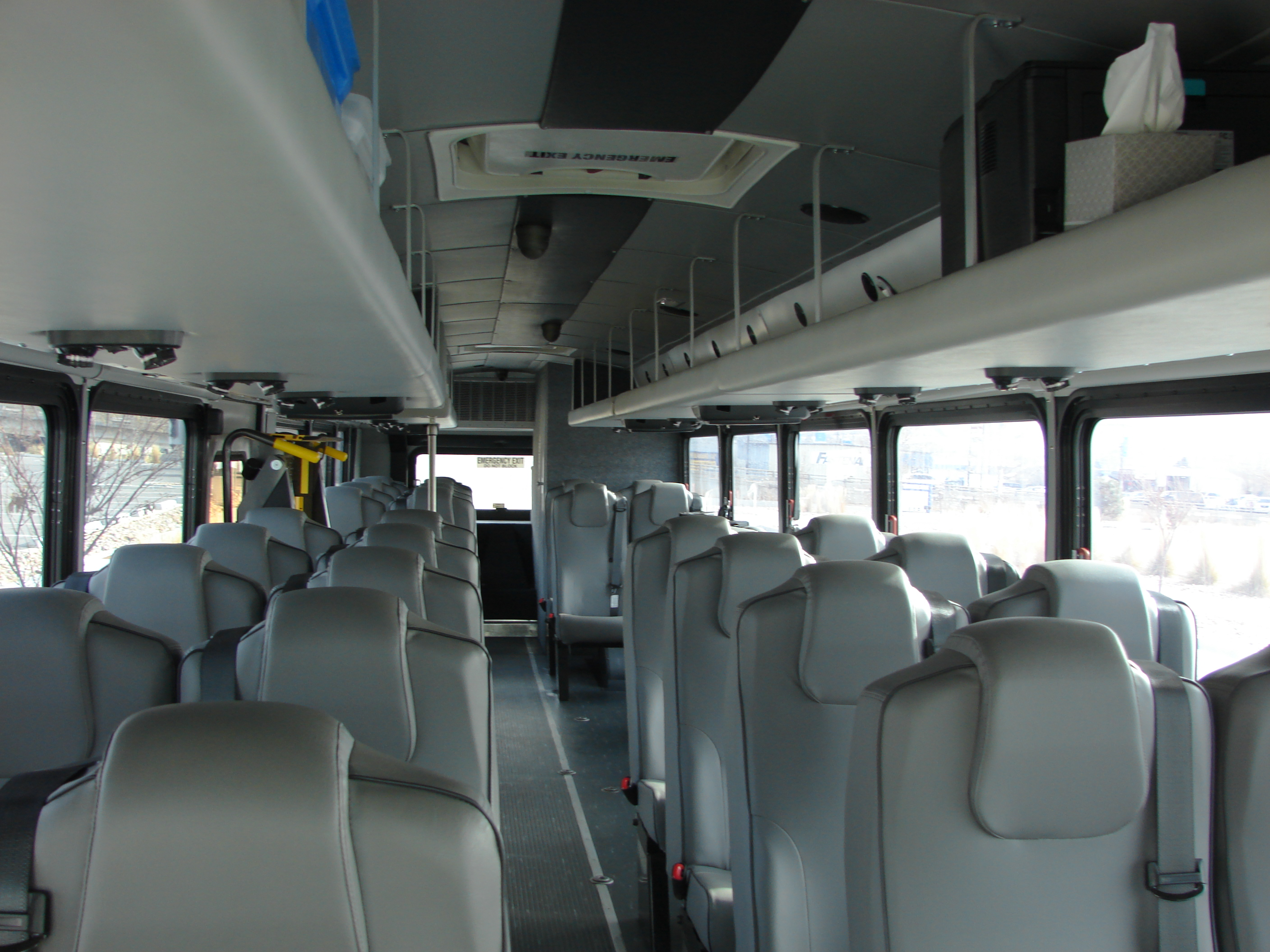
Elevated Transit Thomas HDX bus interior

Elevated Transit's fleet included two models of 35-passenger buses (Glaval Synergy and Thomas HDX) with three of each model. The Glaval Synergy had compartments with the capacity to hold a limited number of bicycles. However, in anticipation of multiple passengers desiring to transport bicycles to the Moab area, the buses had the ability to tow a bicycle trailer. (Note: The Glaval Synergy buses used on the Blanding - Salt Lake City route have the capacity to carry up to eight bicycles. If additional capacity is needed, advance reservations must be made to arrange for a towed bicycle trailer.)The Thomas HDX model were most often used for school buses, but occasionally modified (as for Elevated Transit) for commercial transport. Both buses had Wi-Fi, available satellite TV, lavatories, wheelchair access, additional space for baggage and bicycles

== History ==
Decades ago, Greyhound provide more extensive bus service in rural Utah than it does today, but most of these routes were abandoned years ago For quite a few years replacement service has been sought and a similar proposed bus service was close to realization in 2012. This service was to be provided by the Salt Lake Express, however, the proposal fell through when Salt Lake Express's buses couldn't meet the required Americans with Disabilities Act (ADA) standards. The contract was opened again for bidding, with the proposal from Wasatch Transportation being accepted. About a year later the new subsidiary company (Elevated Transit) received its transportation license on 3 October 2013.

After several false starts, Elevated Transit began operating on 13 August 2014. Original plans were to commence operations in late April, then mid June, but buses did not begin running until August. The later-than-planned start was due, in part, to delays in the delivery of it vehicles. For the first three days of operation 13–15 August), passengers were allowed to ride fare free to encourage familiarity with the service as well as identify any possible problems with the service ("beta testing").

In 2015, Elevated Transit was awarded the Best Brand Design by the American Institute of Graphic Arts. The company's logo and brand design were developed with help from Cocoa Productions (Midway, Utah).

== Routes ==
As of June 1, 2017, Elevated Transit has discontinued its former routed between Salt Lake City and Blanding as well as Richfield and no scheduled service remains. This is a result of the discontinued UDOT funding.

=== Blanding - Salt Lake City ===
- Blanding - San Juan Campus of Utah State University Eastern (USUE) on West 100 South
- Blanding - Visitors Center on North Grayson Parkway (US-191)
- Monticello - Shell station on North Main Street (US-191)
- Monticello - West 200 North (near LDS Temple)
- Moab - 7-Eleven on South Main Street (US-191)
- Moab - Lions Park Transit Hub at junction of US-191 and SR-128 (Note: The Lions Park Transit Hub is a recently constructed facility in Grand County, just northwest of Moab at the junction of US-191 and SR-128 on the south bank of the Colorado River. It was completed in the late spring of 2014 as part of an effort to increase safety for alternative transportation (non-motorized vehicles) in the area.)
- Green River - Knights Inn on East Main Street (SR-19)
- Price - USUE on East 400 North, stops only on the northbound run and stops twice (Note: On the northbound run of the Blanding - Salt Lake City route, the bus stops on the campus of Utah State University Eastern (USUE) in Price, then stops at the Walmart on East Main Street (SR-55) for a 39 minute layover before returning to the USUE campus and continuing north. (This facilitates a daily round trip from USUE to Walmart.) However, on the southbound run the bus does not stop at USUE, but still has a 30 minute layover at the Walmart.)
- Price - Walmart on East Main Street (SR-55)--includes a 39-minute layover on the northbound run and a 30-minute layover on the southbound run
- Spanish Fork - Chevron station on North Chappel Drive, just off US-6
- Provo - Intermodal Center (FrontRunner station) on South University Avenue (US-189)
- Provo - Greyhound stop/gas station on West Center Street (SR-114)
- Salt Lake City - International Airport on Terminal Drive--on the northbound run only it includes a 10-minute layover
- Salt Lake City - Greyhound station at the Intermodal Hub (Amtrak/FrontRunner/TRAX station) on South 600 West

=== Richfield - Salt Lake City ===
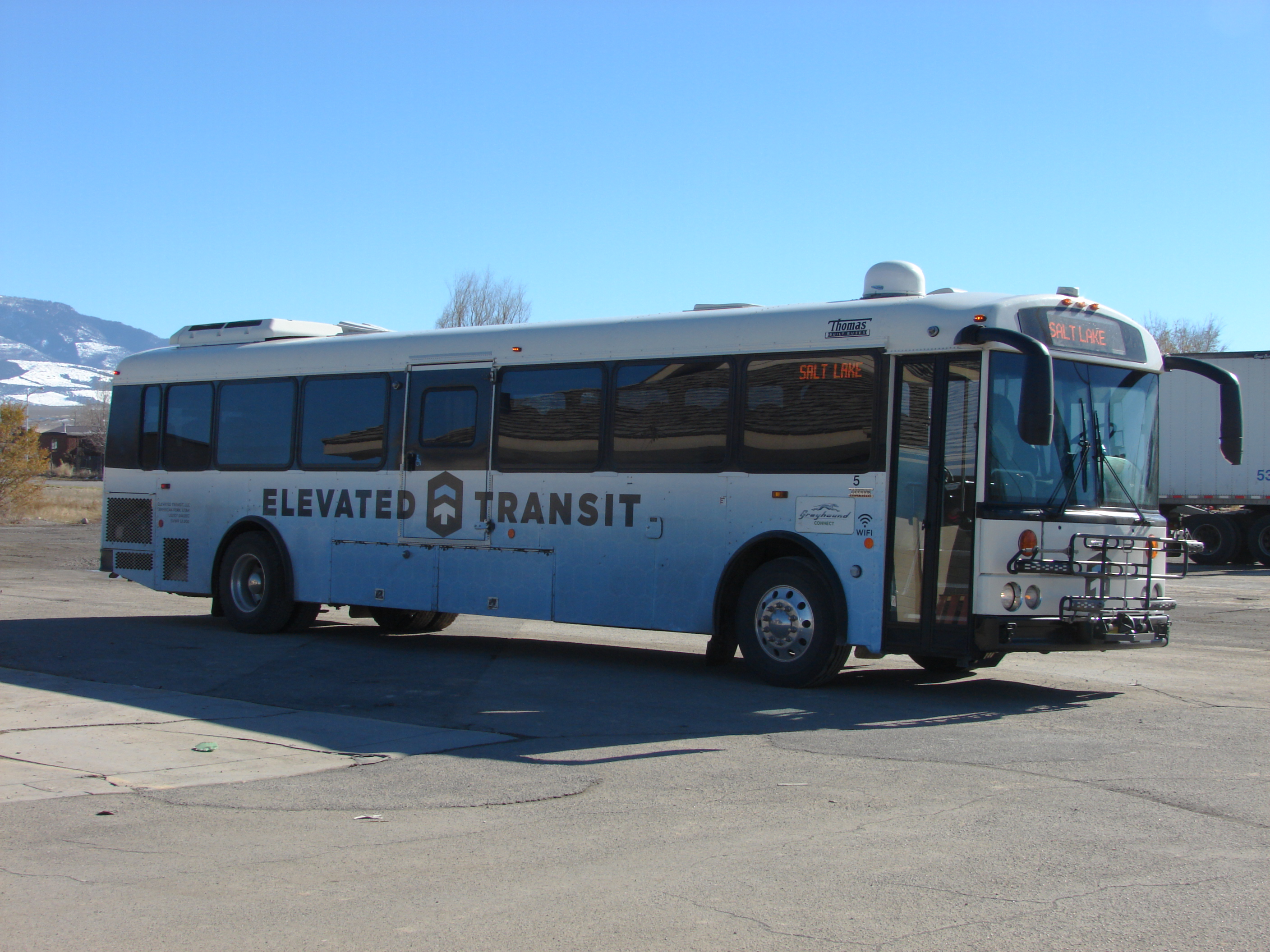
An Elevated Transit Thomas HDX bus at the Chevron station in Centerfield

- Richfield - Miller's Travel Center on West 1250 South, just off I-70 (Exit 37)
- Salina - Holly's Pantry/Conoco station on South State Street (US-50)
- Centerfield - Chevron station on North Main Street (US-89)
- Gunnison - Central Utah Correctional Facility (State Prison) on East 300 North (US-89)
- Manti - Chevron station on North Main Street (US-89)
- Manti - North 200 East (near LDS Temple)
- Ephraim - Snow College on North 100 East
- Ephraim - Walmart on North Main Street (US-89)
- Fairview - Chevron station on North State Street (US-89)
- Mount Pleasant - Library on East Main Street, just off US-89
- Moroni - Conoco station on West Main Street (SR-116)
- Nephi - 7-Eleven on East 100 North (SR-132)--includes a 15-minute layover on both the northbound and southbound runs
- Provo - Intermodal Center (FrontRunner station) on South University Avenue (US-189)
- Provo - Greyhound stop/gas station on West Center Street (SR-114)
- Salt Lake City - Greyhound Station at the Intermodal Hub (Amtrak/FrontRunner/TRAX station) on South 600 West

In addition to these daily runs, Elevated Transit provided additional roundtrips on the Richfield - Salt Lake City route. These additional roundtrips made most of the same stops along the route and run each Thursday thru Monday. They started in the mid afternoon in Richfield with a 30-minute layover in Salt Lake City in the early evening before returning to Richfield. There was also a 10-minute layover in Gunnison on the northbound leg only and no layover in Nephi for either direction. These roundtrips did not stop in either direction at the following: Snow College in Ephraim, Fairview, and Mount Pleasant. One of the intended purposes for this additional trip was to facilitate access from the Wasatch Front to the Central Utah Correctional Facility (CUCF). Prison visitors could ride down to Gunnison in the morning and then return the same evening.

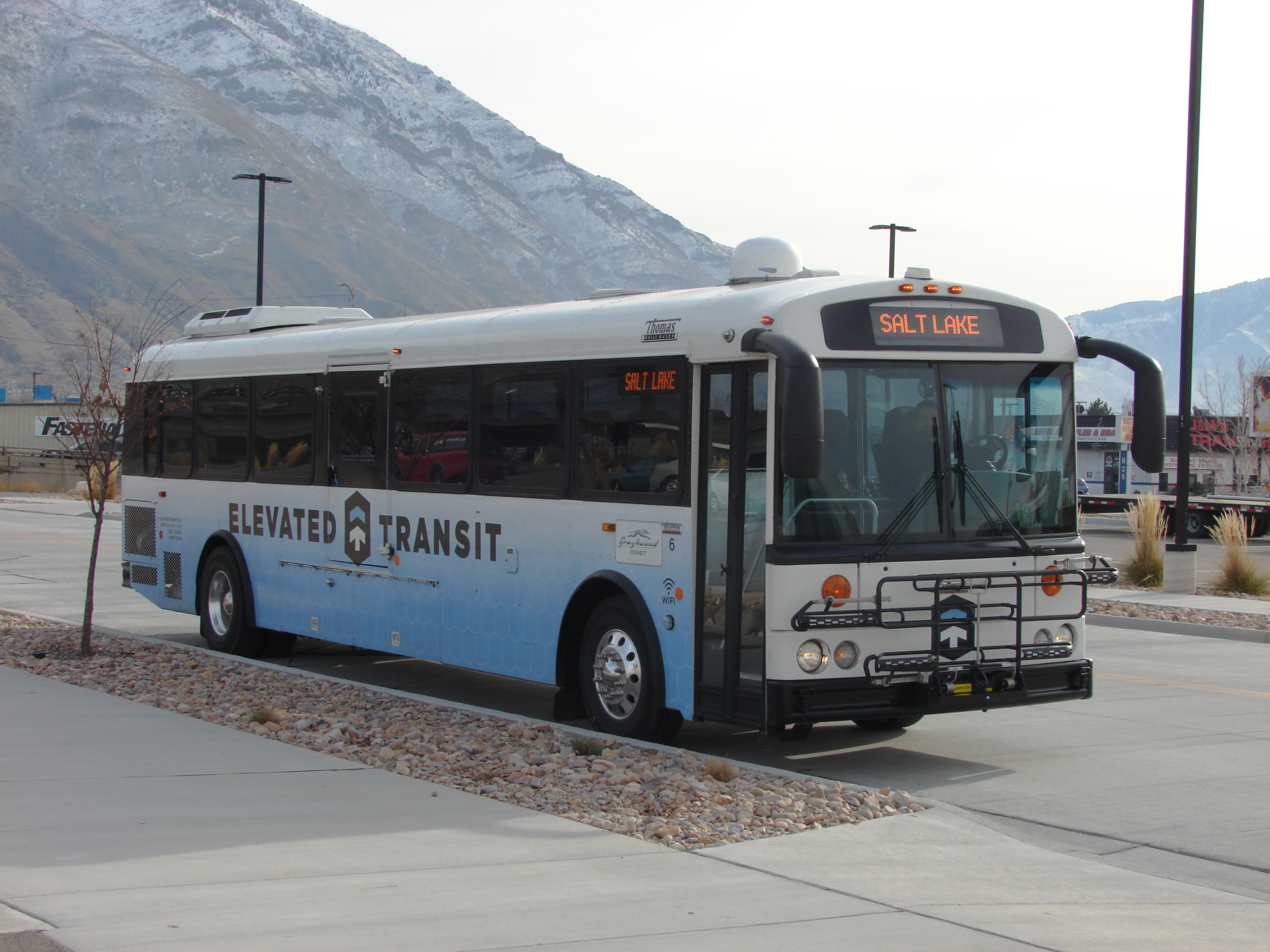
An Elevated Transit Thomas HDX bus at the Provo Intermodal Center

== See also ==
- Utah Transit Authority
