= Reddick Allred =

American soldier and missionary

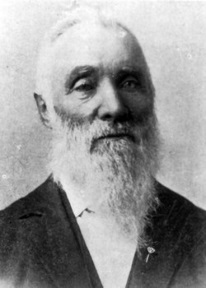
- Allred in his older years
- Born: February 21, 1822; Nashville, Tennessee, United States
- Died: October 10, 1906 (aged 84); Chester, Utah, United States
- Burial place: Spring City Cemetery, Spring City, Utah
- Military career
- Allegiance: United States
- Branch: United States Army
- Service years: 1846 — 1872
- Rank: Colonel
- Unit: Mormon Battalion
- Conflicts: 1838 Mormon War; Mexican–American War: Capture of Tucson; Black Hawk War
- Other work: Mormon pioneer Missionary

Reddick Newton Allred was an American colonel and prominent Mormon pioneer and missionary who was quartermaster of the Mormon Battalion during the Mexican–American War.

== Early years ==
Allred was born on February 21, 1822 as the son of Isaac Allred and Mary Calvert. His identical twin brother was Reddin Alexander Allred. Allred was baptized in 1830 and moved to Nauvoo, Illinois until 1846 when the Death of Joseph Smith caused all Mormons to be expulsed from the town. Around this time, Allred participated in the 1838 Mormon War and in 1843, married Lucy Hoyt.

== Mexican–American War ==
After the expulsion of all Mormons from Nauvoo, Allred enlisted in the Mormon Battalion and participated in the Mexican–American War and marched to California. Allred served as quartermaster of the Battalion and would go on to participate in the Capture of Tucson.

== Pioneering life ==
Around 1849, Allred traveled with his family to the State of Deseret within the Allen Taylor Company and served as captain. On August 28, 1852, Allred filled a mission for the Sandwich Islands and returned in 1855 within the William McBride Company. He later participated in the Willie & Martin Handcart Rescue 1856 to relieve the members of a Latter-day Saint Church stuck within the Wyoming Territory. In 1857, he married for the second time, to Amilla Jane McPherson, and was elected to his first term in the Utah Territorial Legislature. Allred moved to Nephi in 1858, then to Spring City in 1859, and spent the rest of his life living in either Spring City or Chester.

== Black Hawk War ==
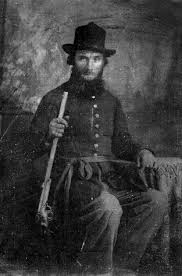
Allred during the Black Hawk War

Around 1865, members of 16 Ute, Southern Paiute, Apache and Navajo tribes began having skirmishes, battles and raids with Mormon settlers. On April 12, 1862, Allred along with eighty-four men started up the fight near Salina Canyon with the mentality that the Native Americans would flee before such an imposing show of force but the fight proved to be a military disaster as the local Ute spotted the attempted ambush and began firing from the high ground. The casualties of the skirmish left two dead and Allred was relieved of command of any further steps of the skirmish as remaining command was handed over to Colonel Warren S. Snow. Allred would go on the participate in other skirmishes of the war and the Native Americans would go on to be defeated as the war concluded.

== Later years ==
In 1861 he married Calysta Ward Warrick and in 1867 he was ordained as Bishop by President Canute Peterson as he would that position for 10 years. Reddick also served as justice and postmaster in Spring City, served five terms in the Territorial legislature, and was a member of the first City Council in Spring City. Allred was also ordained a Patriarch by Apostle George Teasdale on May 15, 1898.

Reddick Allred died on October 10, 1905, in Chester and was buried in the Spring City Cemetery.
