= William Draper Jr. (merchant) =

Utah farmer, shoemaker, and merchant

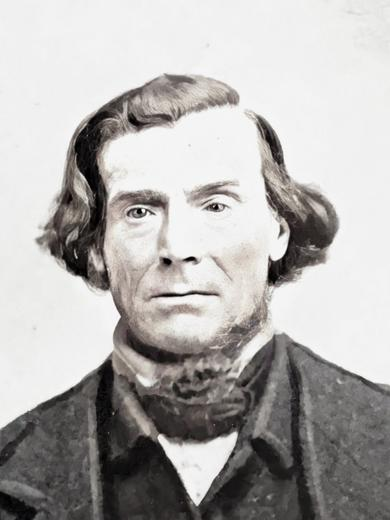
- Draper around 1866
- Born: April 24, 1807; Lennox and Addington, Upper Canada
- Died: May 28, 1886 (aged 79); Freedom, Utah, U.S.
- Burial place: Freedom Cemetery, Utah
- Monuments: William Draper Jr. Monument at Draper Historic Park
- Citizenship: United States
- Occupations: Farmer, shoemaker, merchant
- Years active: 1834-1886
- Known for: The city of Draper, Utah was named for him
- Movement: Mormonism
- Spouse(s): Elizabeth Staker (1827-1886), Martha Raymer (1846-1846), Mary Ann Manhart (1848-1886), Mariel Thompson (1848-1886), Mary Ann Howarth (1853-1886), Ruth Hannah Newton (1854-1886), Fanny Newton (1857-1886)
- Children: 52

Signature
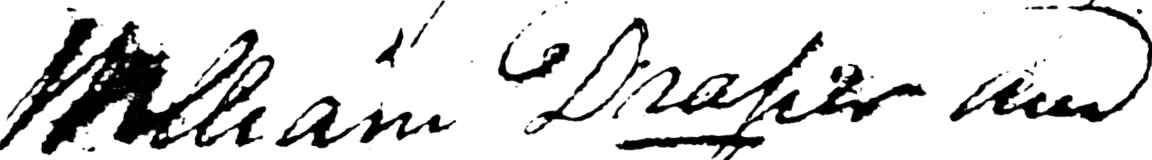

William Draper Jr. (1807–1886) was a farmer, shoemaker and merchant. The city of Draper, Utah was named for him. He served the Church of Jesus Christ of Latter-day Saints as a missionary and held the roles of priest, high priest and bishop in the church.

== Early life ==
William Draper Jr. was born on April 24, 1807, in Richmond Township, Ontario, Canada (then Upper Canada). He was the fifth child of William Draper Sr. and Lydia Lathrop. He was the grandson of Thomas Draper and Lydia Rogers. William is a descendant of the early Massachusetts settler James Draper "The Puritan". He was baptized April 25, 1811 in Marlborough, Middlesex, Massachusetts.

== Joining the LDS church ==
In June 1832, William heard the Gospel preached for the first time by Elder Miller and others in company with him. In January 1833, he heard Brigham Young preach that same Gospel, in the township of Loughborough Township, Upper Canada and he went on to become a member of The Church of Jesus Christ of Latter-day Saints, and was baptized on March 20, 1833, in Loughborough Township. In June that same year, he was ordained a priest under the hands of Brigham Young. On September 11, 1834, William along with his wife and three children left Canada, and traveled to Kirtland, Ohio. During the winter of 1835 William attended theological school which was superintended by Joseph Smith. Between 1835 and 1836 William served missions to Canada until in April 1838 he was directed to travel to Morgan County, Illinois to serve missions. Upon arriving he found his position had already taken, so he headed for the settlement at Far West but he fell ill near Huntsville, Randolph County, Missouri and stayed there for a few months.

=== The Mormon War ===
After recovering, he along with other saints, were instructed to head for Caldwell County, and were warned that there might be trouble. At this time people were opposed to any more saints gathering in Far West, even making it unsafe to travel the main roads. William settled near Far West and bought a log house, blacksmith shop and seven acres of good land. He set to work at shoemaking and made his family comfortable again. It was around this time that William was ordained a high priest by Don Carlos Smith. However, hostilities increased daily in the adjoining counties and finally by the middle of October hostilities ran so high they received another message from the prophet requesting everyone to go into Far West. Many tore down their log houses and moved to the city, however William did not do this and instead just moved into an old log cabin with three other families. As hostilities grew worse, the Missouri State Militia took several Latter-day Saint men captive and held them in the militia's camp on the Crooked River. A company of Latter-Day Saint militia came to rescue them, and a fierce battle was fought on October 25, 1838. This battle led to Governor Lilburn W. Boggs issue of the infamous "extermination order" on October 27, 1838, declaring, "The Mormons must be treated as enemies, and must be exterminated or driven from the State if necessary, for the public peace." On March 17, 1839, William and his family left Missouri and headed west, with no destination and decided to settle in Pike County, Illinois. In 1842 when hostilities arose again for the Mormons, William and his family were ordered to leave for Hancock County and settled there in 1843. Joseph Smith, the founder and leader of the Latter Day Saint movement, and his brother Hyrum Smith were killed by a mob in Carthage, Illinois, on June 27, 1844. William describes how the violence escalated in June 1844 in his autobiography which he wrote in December 1881.

"One day there came an armed force of about sixty men. They set fire to my hay and grain that was in the stack and then set fire to the house...while my wife and some of the generous crowd that had volunteered to help her were carrying out some of the things, the rest of the crowd divided the straw out of a bed into four corners of the room and set fire to it. My wife tried to put it out but some ruffians took her by the shoulders and put her out doors. She was not in a condition to be handled roughly with safety. The house burned down with the rest of its contents. I was obliged to flee to save my life. I remained out until there came on a very heavy thunderstorm. I then ventured out to see what had become of my family. I found them all alive and personal injury done but my house and my hay, and considerable fencing was burned to the ground. Which threw my field open to the cattle, where I had about a thousand bushels of corn mostly in shock, but all exposed to ravages of hogs, sheep and cattle which were roaming around at large in abundance. My [wife] begged me to leave as the mob was hunting me the last she saw of them. So I was obliged to take shelter in a large shock of corn as it was raining very hard. I lay there until it began to leak through on me...then went back to help my wife gather up the little fragments left. By this time daylight appeared and while we were busy preparing to leave, lo, and behold, we saw the armed men; they were in pursuit of me again, so I was obliged to flee and I made my escape but it was upon my hands and knees through the brush. I succeeded in reaching another neighbourhood. There I got a young man to go and let my folks know where I was and help them pack up their things and bring them to me, which he did. I took them to Pike county...On the first day of May we crossed the Mississippi River and took the trail to follow those that had started before for the mountains."

William then settled his family in what was to become Council Point, Iowa on the Missouri River. In July 1846, William was appointed bishop at Council Point.

=== Moving to Utah ===
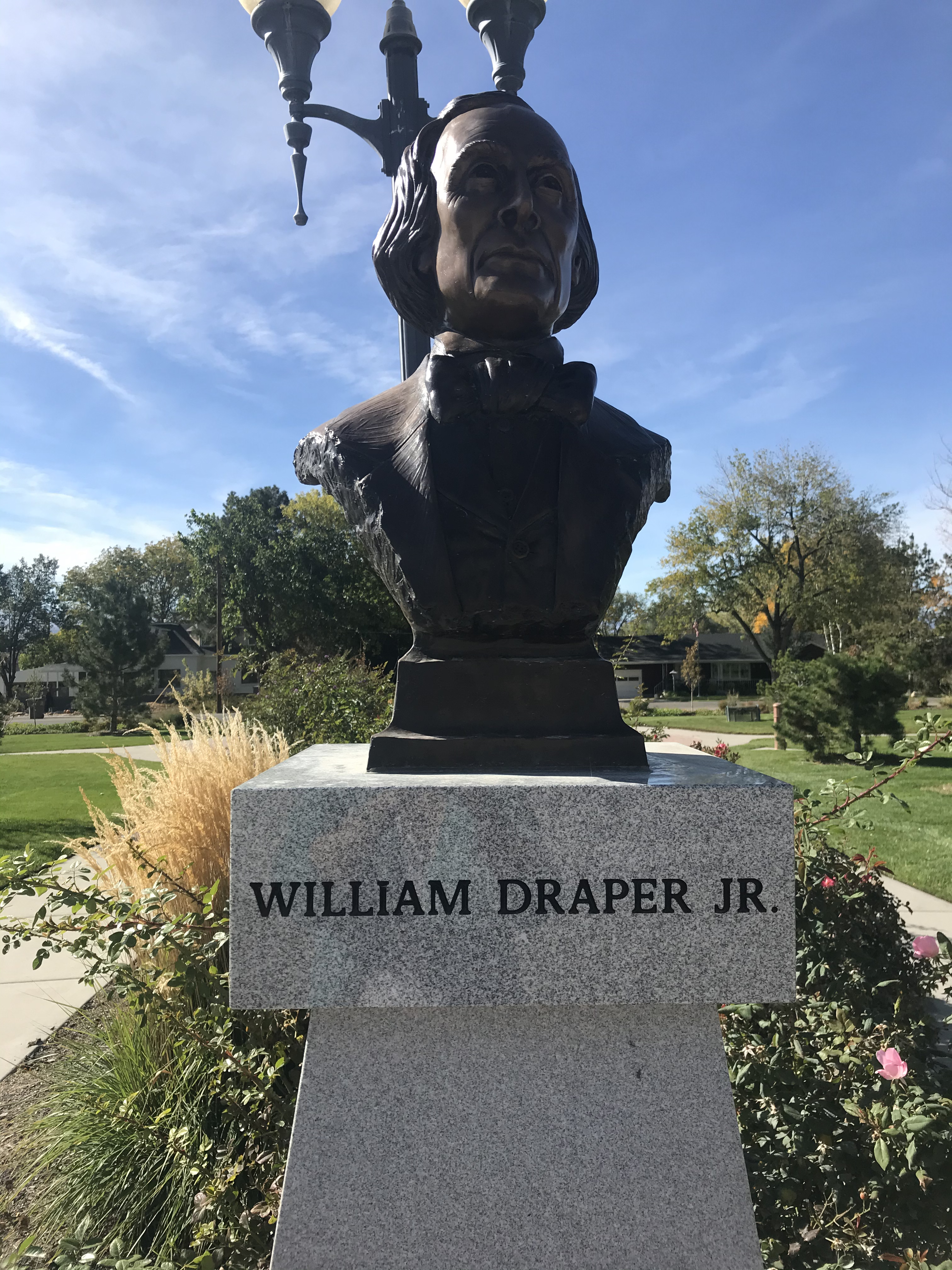
The William Draper Jr. Monument at Draper Historic Park in Draper, Utah

In 1849 he was again called upon to move farther west to Salt Lake City in the Utah Territory. It took William and his family four and a half months of travel to cross the plains. In November 1850, William moved his family to the new community of South Willow Creek (now Draper). William's sister Phebe Draper Palmer Brown and her husband Ebenezer Brown were already living in here when he arrived. By the end of the settlement's first year, most residents were members of the Draper Family. The settlement increased so it became necessary to have the place organized into a branch of the Church. William was called to preside and serve them as a bishop, until the close of 1857. He established for himself a good farm and raised grain, cattle and horses. In the spring of 1858 he had to leave again and go south in the general move, moving to Spanish Fork. He did well until 1862, then the grasshoppers and crickets destroyed the crops. 1863 was also another failure and grain of all kinds raised to an enormous price. By this point, wheat had risen to $5.00 per bushel, wood was hard to get being a long way off and his oldest boys had all married and left William with a large family of little children with only their mothers to help. Putting all these disadvantages together he found he couldn't stand that way of living much longer, so he sold out and moved to Moroni, Sanpete County in early 1865. He bought a house, a lot and about 15 acres of land, paying nine hundred dollars for the property and also bought a one third share of an old gristmill.

== Personal life and death ==
William was a polygamist and he had seven wives and about fifty-two children during his life. A great majority of the city of Draper was made up of the Draper's, William having so many children being a great contributor to the city's population increase. He would often run into his children or grandchildren on the street. One of his grandchildren, Kimball Mertilious Draper (188–1983) was a grandson of William and one day he met ran into his grandfather on the street in Moroni. William asked him whose child he was and he responded to him "you ought to know, you're my grandfather."

=== Death ===
William died on May 28, 1886 in Freedom, Sanpete County, Utah, United States, at the age of 79. A monument for William Draper Jr. was built and placed in Draper Historic Park.

== Image gallery ==
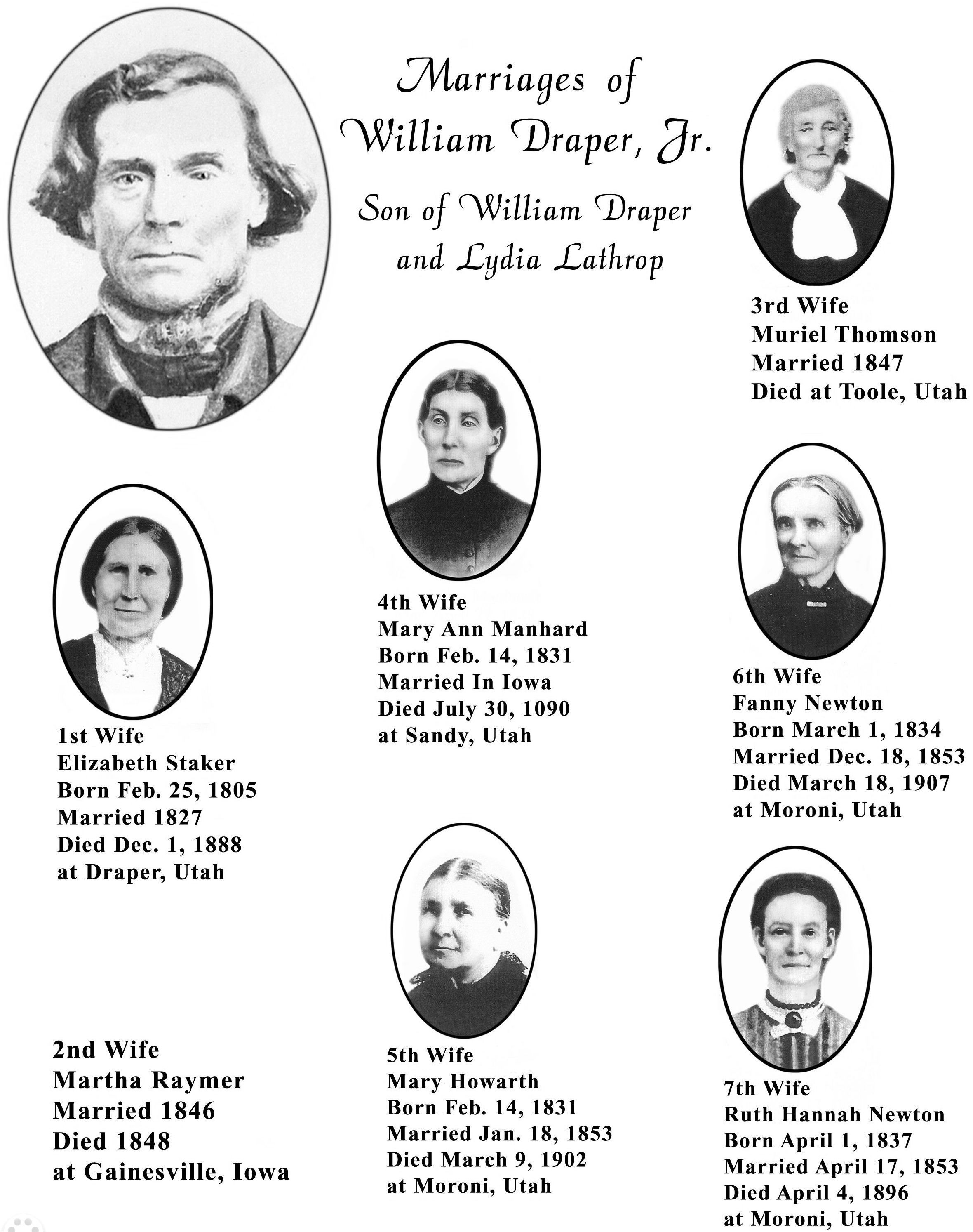
The Marriages of William Draper Jr. (1807–1886)

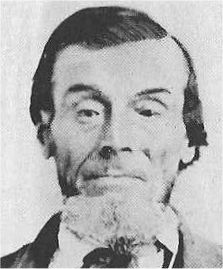
William Draper Jr. later in life

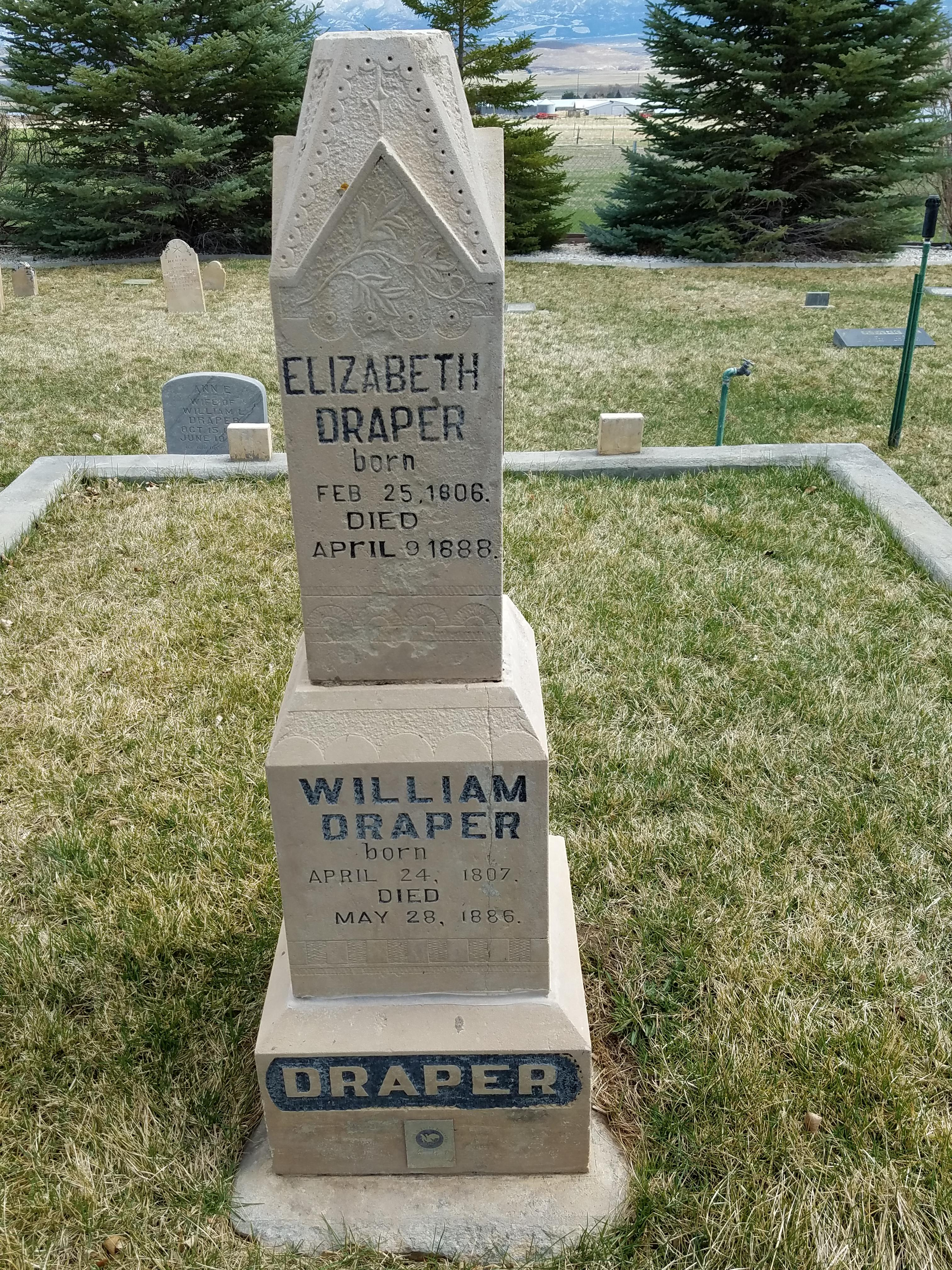
William Draper Jr. (1807–1886) grave at Freedom Cemetery

== Bibliography ==
- Draper, Thomas Waln-Morgan (1892). The Drapers in America: Being a History and Genealogy of Those of That Name and Connection. United States: J. Polhemus Printing Company. ISBN 1332293824.
- Draper, Delbert Morley (1958). The Mormon Drapers. Salt Lake City.
- Draper, William, 1807–1886. Life of William Draper, https://catalog.churchofjesuschrist.org/record/f6123b03-331f-41a0-be20-ed09aa06b6f2/0?view=summary&lang=eng (accessed: January 21, 2025)
