= Draper, Utah =

City in United States

- City
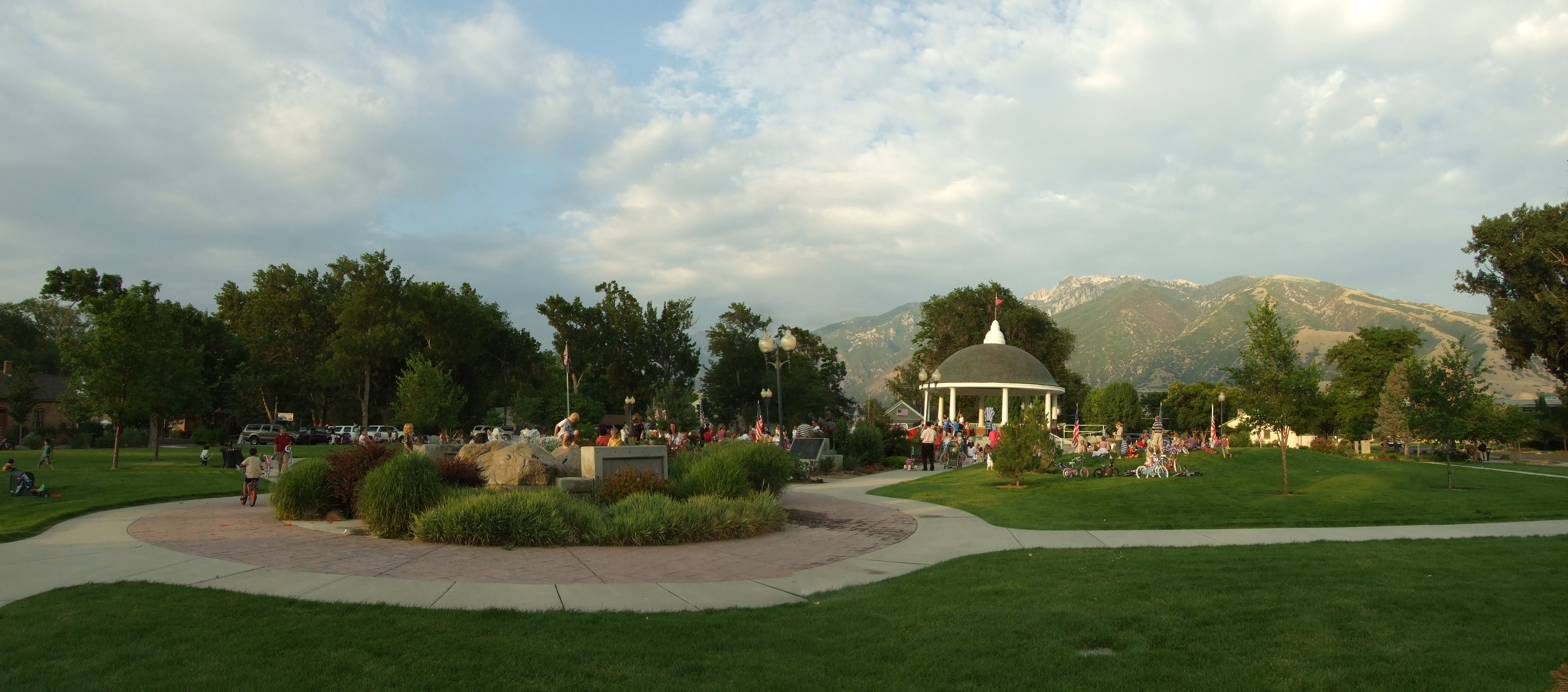
- Draper Historic Park

- Location in Salt Lake County and the state of Utah.
- Coordinates: 40°30′23″N 111°52′33″W
- Country: United States
- State: Utah
- Counties: Salt Lake, Utah
- Settled: 1849
- Incorporated: 1978
- Founder: Ebenezer Brown and his wife Phebe Draper Palmer Brown
- Named for: William Draper Jr.

Area
  - Total: 29.97 sq mi (77.61 km^{2})
  - Land: 29.95 sq mi (77.57 km^{2})
  - Water: 0.015 sq mi (0.04 km^{2})
- Elevation: 4,751 ft (1,448 m)

Population (2020)
  - Total: 51,017
  - Density: 1,703/sq mi (657.7/km^{2})
- Time zone: UTC−7 (Mountain (MST))
  - Summer (DST): UTC−6 (MDT)
- ZIP code: 84020
- Area codes: 385, 801
- FIPS code: 49-20120
- GNIS feature ID: 2410355
- Website: draperutah.gov

Draper is a city in Salt Lake and Utah counties in the U.S. state of Utah, about 20 miles (32 km) south of Salt Lake City along the Wasatch Front. As of the 2020 census, the population is 51,017, up from 7,143 in 1990.

Draper is part of two metropolitan areas; the Salt Lake County portion is in the Salt Lake City metropolitan area, while the Utah County portion is in the Provo-Orem metropolitan area.

The Utah State Prison was located in Draper from 1951 to 2022, near Point of the Mountain, alongside Interstate 15. State politicians voted to condemn the facility, and prisoners were moved to the Utah State Correctional Facility.

The city is home of 1-800 Contacts and a large eBay campus.

== History ==
In the fall of 1849, Ebenezer Brown brought cattle to graze along the mountain stream of South Willow Creek. The next spring, Ebenezer moved with his wife Phebe Draper Palmer Brown and their family to settle in Sivogah, the Native American name for the area, which means "willows." By the end of 1850, residents of the small settlement consisted of Ebenezer Brown and his three children (by a prior marriage), Phebe Draper Palmer Brown and her two children (by a prior marriage), and Phebe's brother, William Draper Jr. and his large family, numbering about fifteen. Consequently, by the end of the settlement's first year, most residents were members of the Draper Family, and William Draper Jr. was soon called to be the presiding elder for the Church of Jesus Christ of Latter-day Saints in the area. During this time, the Drapers mainly farmed, and Ebenezer Brown ranched and sold cattle to immigrants heading to the gold fields of California along what became the Mormon Road. More settlers moved to the area in the next few years. Later the area was called South Willow Creek.

By 1852, 20 families lived along the creek. In 1854, the first post office was established with the name Draperville in recognition of William Draper Jr. and its other Draper residents. The town's name in later years was shortened to Draper. (William Draper Sr., father of both William and Phebe Draper, who was older at the time of his family's settlement of Draper is buried in the town cemetery.)

Hostilities with the Native Americans began in 1854, and a fort was established where the local settlers lived during the winters of 1855 and 1856. The fort was never completed, as the feared hostilities did not materialize, and its former location is now the site of the Draper Historical Park and the aptly-named Fort Street.

In the 1940s, Draper was known as the "Egg Basket of Utah." Eggs produced in Draper were marketed from coast to coast, and the co-op furnished eggs for the military troops in the South Pacific during WWII. The poultry business was the single most important economic industry in Draper during this time. One large poultry farm was the Washburn Poultry Farm, run by Bruce D. Washburn, with over 10,000 chickens during the 1950s.

Draper remained a small farming community until the late 1990s when its population began growing exponentially from 7,257 in 1990 to an estimated 47,710 in 2018.

Draper was incorporated as a city in 1978.

== Geography ==
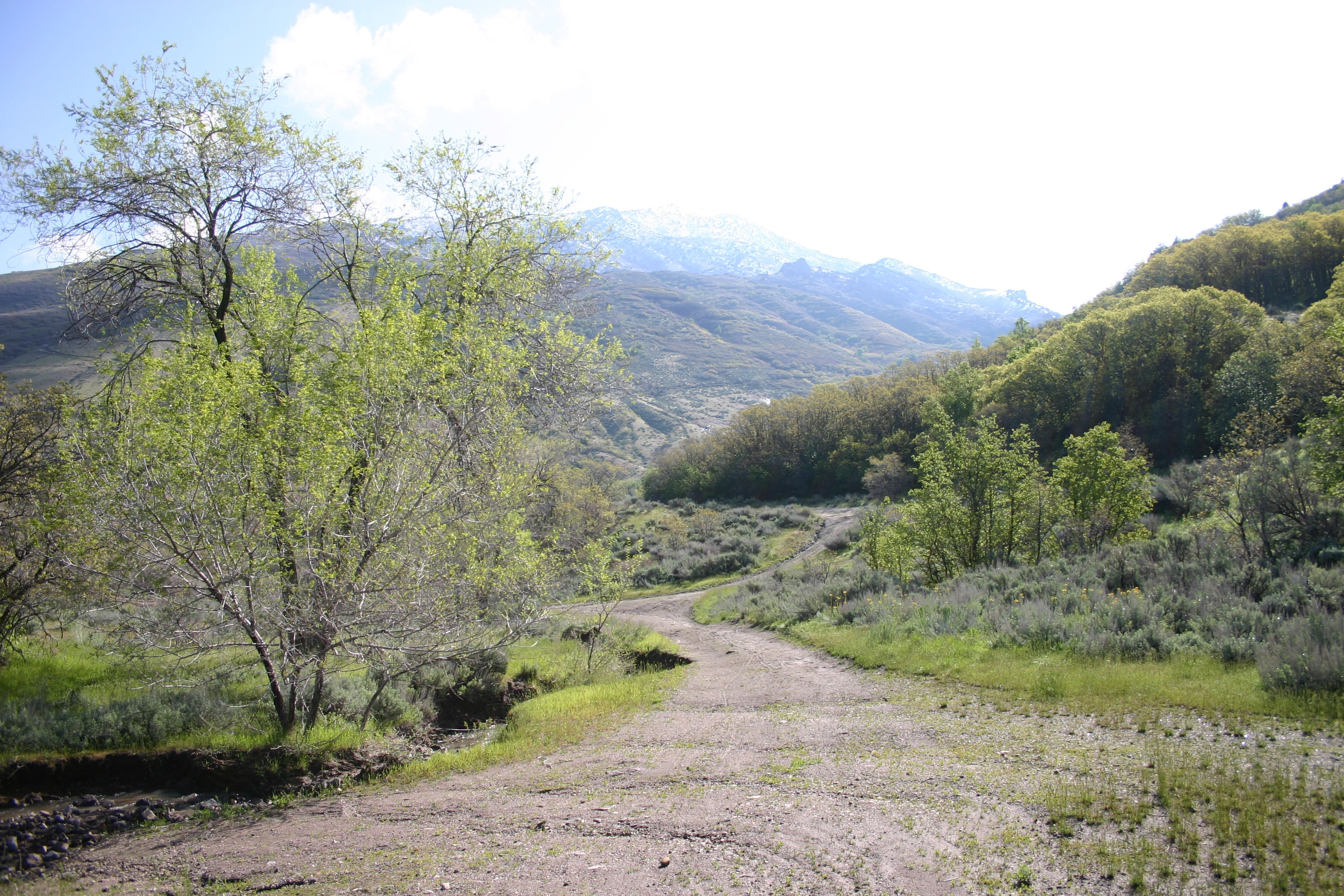
Corner Canyon, Draper

Draper City is nestled in the far southeast corner of the Salt Lake Valley, with the Wasatch Mountain Range on the east and the Traverse Ridge Mountain on the south. At the Point of the Mountain, Draper is known for being one of the most popular and best wind areas in the country for hang gliding and paragliding.

Draper lies roughly midway between Salt Lake City and Provo. Draper is bordered by Riverton and Bluffdale to the west, South Jordan to the northwest, Sandy to the north, Alpine to the southeast, Highland to the south, and Lehi to the southwest.

According to the United States Census Bureau, the city has a total area of 30.1 square miles (78.0 km^{2}), of which 30.1 square miles (77.9 km^{2}) is land and 0.015 square miles (0.04 km^{2}), or 0.05%, is water.

=== Climate ===
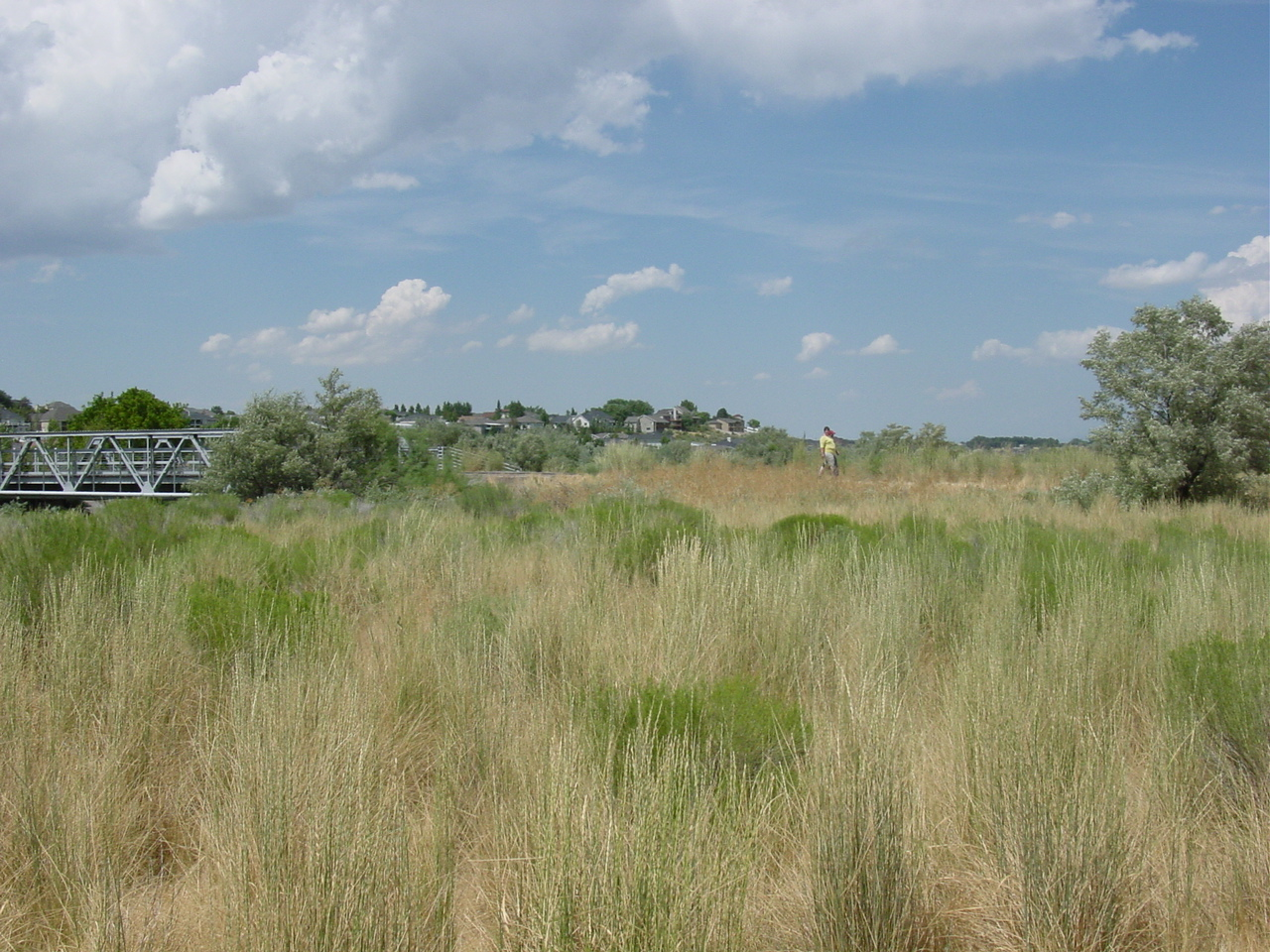
Jordan River Parkway, Draper

Draper's climate is roughly identical to other Salt Lake City suburbs. However, due to being further away from the Great Salt Lake, varied elevation, and from the downtown urban heat island effect, Draper experiences a slightly drier winter and more extremes in temperatures.

The average temperatures in winter and summer, respectively, are 30 °F to 50 °F, and 80 °F to 100 °F. Springs are usually mild and wet, while fall can sometimes become an Indian summer with drier weather. Monsoonal moisture from the south usually brings afternoon thunderstorms in July and August. Draper falls on the border of the humid continental/subtropical climatic zones and is technically a cool/warm semi-arid desert environment, but with summer monsoonal moisture. Snow usually falls regularly from November through March.

== Demographics ==
Historical population
Census	Pop.	Note	%±
1980	5,521		—
1990	7,257		31.4%
2000	25,220		247.5%
2010	42,274		67.6%
2020	51,017		20.7%
U.S. Decennial Census

=== 2020 census ===
As of the 2020 census, Draper had a population of 51,017 and a median age of 33.9 years. 28.6% of residents were under the age of 18 and 9.1% of residents were 65 years of age or older. For every 100 females there were 108.2 males, and for every 100 females age 18 and over there were 110.1 males age 18 and over.

97.2% of residents lived in urban areas, while 2.8% lived in rural areas.

There were 15,007 households in Draper, of which 45.1% had children under the age of 18 living in them. Of all households, 65.4% were married-couple households, 12.6% were households with a male householder and no spouse or partner present, and 17.8% were households with a female householder and no spouse or partner present. About 16.1% of all households were made up of individuals and 4.9% had someone living alone who was 65 years of age or older.

There were 15,590 housing units, of which 3.7% were vacant. The homeowner vacancy rate was 0.6% and the rental vacancy rate was 6.8%.

Racial composition as of the 2020 census
Race	Number	Percent
White	41,599	81.5%
Black or African American	687	1.3%
American Indian and Alaska Native	355	0.7%
Asian	2,299	4.5%
Native Hawaiian and Other Pacific Islander	234	0.5%
Some other race	1,804	3.5%
Two or more races	4,039	7.9%
Hispanic or Latino (of any race)	4,728	9.3%

=== 2010 census ===
2010 Census Information

Population	42,272
Median Age	30.7 years
Mean Household Income	$120,088
Median Household Income	$94,852
Estimated Average Household Size	3.38 persons
Total Households	12,287
Owner Occupied	9,708
Renter Occupied	2,579
Median Home Price	$434,450
Median Rental Rate	$1,156

== Arts and culture ==
=== Venues ===
The Draper Amphitheater is a live performance venue on South Mountain with a seating capacity over 2,000, sound and lighting systems, and a view of Salt Lake Valley. The amphitheater hosts touring shows and concerts along with running its own productions.

Draper Historic Theatre, originally a movie theater, is a non-profit live theater built in 1938.

=== Events ===
Draper Days is an annual festival which occurs every July. It consists of live music, rodeos a parade, fireworks, movie nights, vendor booths, and more. The event started in 2001. As a response to the COVID-19 pandemic, 2020 Draper Days was cancelled and 2021 Draper Days had "No parade or 5K run, no pickleball tournament or Scales and Tails," according to Doug Dredge.

Draper holds free-to-attend concerts in Draper Historic Park each Wednesday evening of June. Food trucks are present.

=== Library ===
The Draper Library is a branch of the Salt Lake County Library. The Draper Library has two conference rooms available to cardholders, computer workstations, and around 105,000 borrow-able items. Digitally, cardholders are able to access e-books, audiobooks, magazines, music, newspapers, and videos through collections like Libby, Sora, and Hoopla

The Draper Library also holds a variety of community events.

== Economy ==
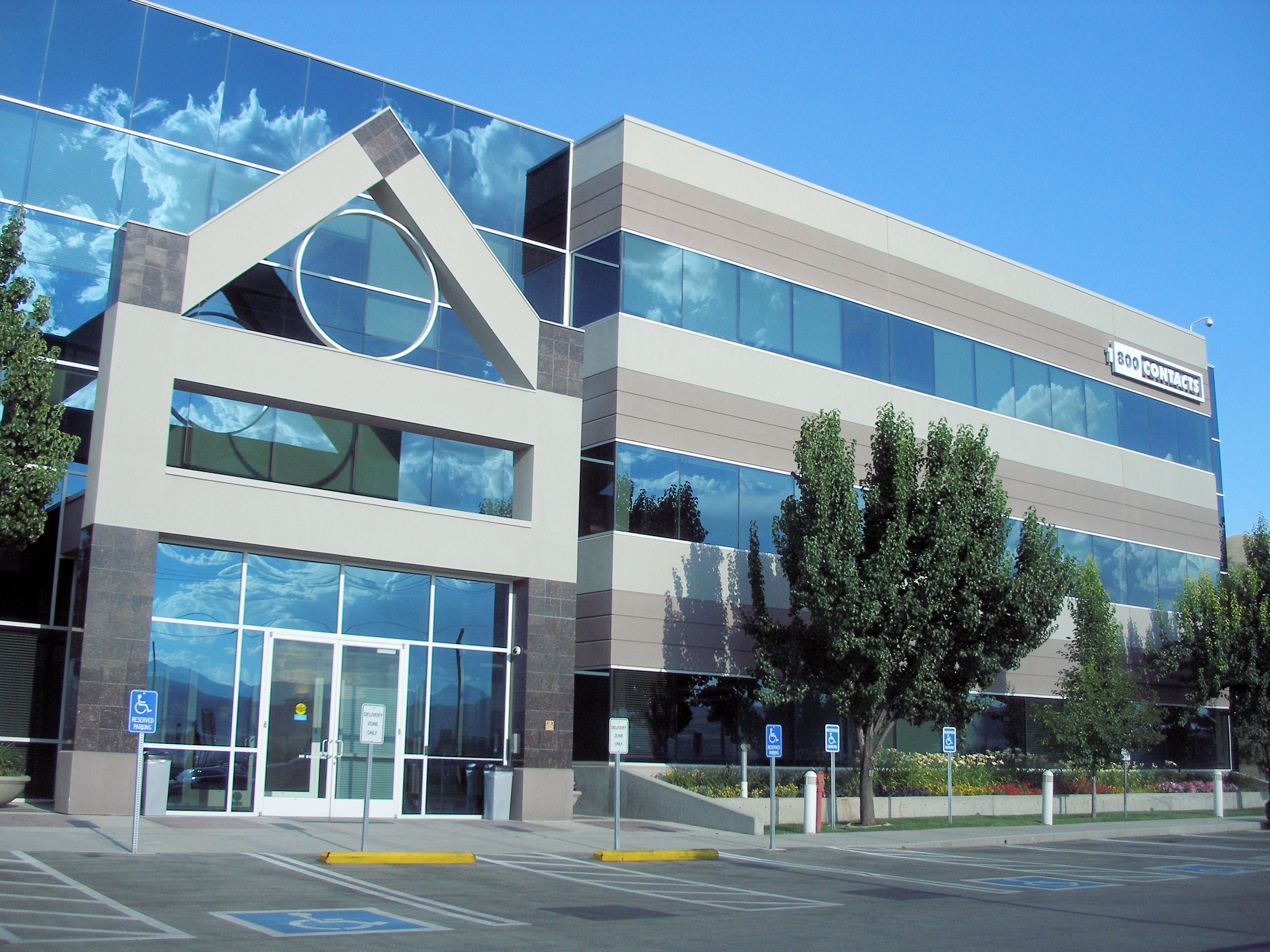
The headquarters of 1-800 Contacts in Draper, Utah.

Draper is home to the tech call center of PGP Corporation, the call center of Musician's Friend, and the headquarters of 1-800 Contacts, Control4, HealthEquity, and Pluralsight. Draper is also home to Utah's first IKEA, which opened in 2007. The head office of Synchrony Bank is located in Draper, and the Rocky Mountain regional headquarters of Goldman Sachs is located in a nearby plaza.

=== Top employers ===
According to the city's Popular Annual Financial Report for the fiscal year ending June 30, 2018, the top employers in the city are:

#	Employer	# of Employees
1	Utah State Prison	1,000–1,999
2	1-800 Contacts	500–999
3	EMC Corporation	500–999
4	Coca-Cola	500–999
5	City of Draper	250–499

== Transportation ==
Public transportation in Draper is provided by the Utah Transit Authority (UTA).

Draper is served by the TRAX light rail system at Draper Town Center and Kimballs Lane stations. Both stations are on the Blue Line.

The city is also served by FrontRunner commuter rail at Draper station.

== Local media ==
The Draper City Journal is a tabloid-style newspaper covering local government, schools, sports, and features. It is delivered to homes directly monthly by mail.

The city government publishes a bi-monthly city newsletter called "Draper Forward." This publication is mailed to all of the residents in Draper.

== Education ==
The portion in Salt Lake County is in the Canyons School District.

The portion in Utah County is in the Alpine School District.

Joyce University is a school training professionals in nursing and health care.

== Notable people ==
- Dia Frampton (born 1987), singer-songwriter; born in Draper
- Ken Garff (1906–1997), businessman; born in Draper
- Cody Larsen, American football player
- Tyler Larsen, American football player
- George W. Latimer (1900–1990), lawyer; born in Draper
- Andy Phillips (born 1989), football placekicker; born in Draper
- Lauritz Smith (1830–1924), Mormon leader and one of Draper's founders
- Wilson W. Sorensen (1916–2009), president of Utah Technical College; born in Draper
- Douglas R. Stringfellow (1922–1966), one-term congressman; born in Draper
- Kealia Ohai Watt (born 1992), soccer player; born in Draper
- Zach Wilson (born 1999), American football quarterback

== See also ==
- List of cities and towns in Utah
