= Utah State Route 11 =

State Route 11

Route information
- Maintained by Utah Department of Transportation

Location
- Country: United States
- State: Utah

Highway system
- Utah State Highway System; Interstate; US; State; Minor; Scenic
← SR-10	→ SR-12

Utah State Route 11 was a former state highway in southern and central Utah, United States that existed from 1910 to 2008. Although technically the same highway, because of the drastic change made to the route in 1977, there are two articles describing (and two Commons categories for) the former highway:

- Utah State Route 11 (1977-2008), the former state highway designation (legislative overlay) for U.S. Route 89A in Kanab (in Kane County), that connected U.S. Route 89A in Arizona with U.S. Route 89 (it was renumbered as Utah State Route 89A in 2008)
- Utah State Route 11 (1910-1977), the former state highway designation (in most cases legislative overlay) for roads in Kane, Garfield, Piute, Sevier, Sanpete, and Juab counties that are now known as U.S. Route 89A, U.S. Route 89 (from Kanab to Pigeon Hollow Junction [north of Ephraim]), and Utah State Route 132 (from Pigeon Hollow Junction to Nephi). In addition to U.S. Route 89 (south of Pigeon Hollow Junction) the route also included, for a time, the former U.S. Route 189 (which prior to 1939, ran from Pigeon Hollow Junction northwesterly to Nephi).

== See also ==
- List of state highways in Utah
- List of U.S. Highways in Utah
- List of named highway junctions in Utah
- List of highways numbered 11
