= Charles Crawforth Farmstead =

- U.S. National Register of Historic Places
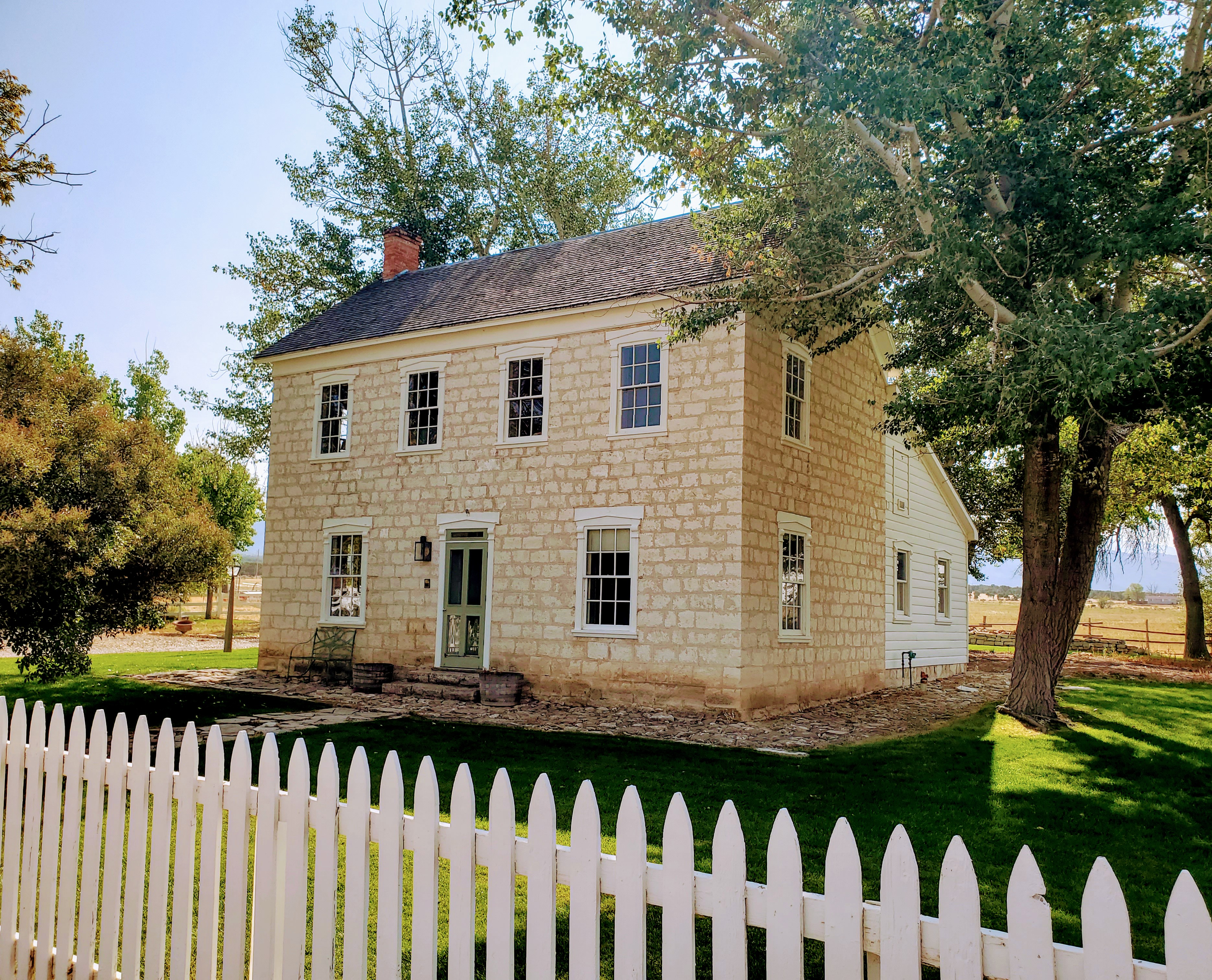

- Location within Utah Location within the United States
- Nearest city: Spring City, Utah
- Coordinates: 39°27′16″N 111°30′43″W
- Area: 1.1 acres (0.45 ha)
- Built: 1884
- Architectural style: Greek Revival
- NRHP reference No.: 80003956
- Added to NRHP: February 19, 1980

The Charles Crawforth Farmstead is a historic house on a farm in Spring City, Utah. It was built with limestone in 1884 by Charles Crawforth, an immigrant from England who converted to the Church of Jesus Christ of Latter-day Saints in 1854 and settled in Provo, Utah in 1855. Crawforth moved to Spring City in 1873 with his family (including ten children), and he built this house, with aspects of Greek Revival architectural style, in 1884. From his death in 1910 to 1918, it belonged to his son Charles L. Crawforth. It has been listed on the National Register of Historic Places since February 19, 1980.

It is located southwest of Spring City, off Pigeon Hollow Rd. The farmstead includes a two-story hall and parlor plan stone house with a rear "T"-wing, a granary/root cellar, a stone carriage house, and a log barn. The farm is oriented to the north, with a view up the valley to Mt. Nebo, and was relatively isolated, perhaps showing that Mormon households did not always follow the same pattern of concentrating homes in villages.

The house may be the one exactly located at 39.454502°N 111.512639°E, on the south side of Crawford Rd., about 300 yards (270 m) west of its intersection with Pigeon Hollow Rd.
