= Freedom, Utah =

Unincorporated community in the state of Utah, United States

Freedom
- Unincorporated community
- Location within the state of Utah
- Coordinates: 39°32′33″N 111°38′58″W
- Country: United States
- State: Utah
- County: Sanpete
- Settled: 1871
- Elevation: 5,787 ft (1,764 m)
- Time zone: UTC-7 (Mountain (MST))
  - Summer (DST): UTC-6 (MDT)
- ZIP codes: 84646
- Area code: 435
- GNIS feature ID: 1441224

Freedom is an unincorporated community in Sanpete County, Utah, United States.

== Description ==
Historical population
| Census | Pop. | Note | %± |
|---|---|---|---|
| 1880 | 102 | | — |
| 1910 | 124 | | — |
| 1920 | 102 | | −17.7% |
Source: U.S. Census Bureau

The settlement is a small agricultural community on the former SR-30 (1935-1966), 4 miles (6.4 km) northwest of Moroni and 6 miles (9.7 km) south of Fountain Green. It was settled in 1871 during a post-Civil War period when several patriotic names developed. The town was originally named Draper for an early settler, but was renamed Freedom in 1877.

The community has always been closely associated with the town of Moroni, even being included in its census precinct through most of its history.
