= Joseph Bennion =

American studio potter

- Born: 1952 (age 73–74); Utah, U.S.
- Education: Brigham Young University (BFA, 1982; MFA, 1986)
- Known for: Functional stoneware
- Spouse: Lee Udall Bennion
- Awards: National Endowment for the Arts fellowship (1990)
- Website: www.joeandleebennion.com

Joseph Wood Bennion (born 1952) is an American studio potter based in Spring City, Utah, where he operates Horseshoe Mountain Pottery. He makes functional stoneware, using a treadle wheel and wood-firing and salt-glazing techniques. He received a National Endowment for the Arts crafts fellowship in 1990. His work and family life were the subject of Steve Olpin's documentary The Potter's Meal (1992).

== Early life and education ==
Bennion grew up in Orem, Utah. He met painter Lee Udall Bennion while studying at Brigham Young University (BYU). They married in 1976 and settled in Spring City.

He took classes at the Tuscarora Pottery School in Tuscarora, Nevada, in 1980, and received a BFA in ceramics from BYU in 1982 and an MFA in ceramics in 1986. He also taught ceramics at BYU and Snow College.

== Pottery ==
In 1980, the Bennions bought a store building on Main Street in Spring City that became his studio and showroom. In a 2021 interview, Bennion described a decision in the mid-1980s to concentrate on sales at his studio. Horseshoe Mountain Pottery's commissions have included 100 place settings for Sundance Resort.

Bennion throws his vessels on a foot-powered treadle wheel and reshapes the wet clay with his fingers and tools. He fires the pottery in a wood kiln, sometimes adding salt to affect the glazed surface. His documented maker's mark is a rectangular impression containing the letter Y.

In his 1986 essay "Aesthetic Communion", published in Ceramics Monthly, Bennion argued that the usefulness of handmade vessels and the experience of handling them were central to their aesthetic value. In a 1991 account of the exhibition American Craft Classics, he described his preference for marks made by ash and kiln vapors over bright colors and decorative motifs.

== Exhibitions and collections ==
Bennion's first public exhibition was held at BYU's Wilkinson Gallery in September 1975. His work was exhibited at the Salt Lake Art Center in 1984. In 1988, Pewabic Pottery in Detroit presented a solo exhibition of his work, Useful Pots. He received a $5,000 National Endowment for the Arts crafts fellowship in 1990.

The Springville Museum of Art holds his Shino Glazed Large Bowl (1996), a gift from the Hafen Dallin Volunteer Guild. The American Museum of Ceramic Art in Pomona, California, holds a salt-glazed teapot donated by the American Ceramic Society.

The Nora Eccles Harrison Museum of Art at Utah State University holds his stoneware Jar (1987).

== Documentary ==
Steve Olpin's 1992 documentary The Potter's Meal follows Bennion's pottery work and family life. It was selected for the 1993 Sundance Film Festival. The film received a Crystal Heart Award at the Heartland Film Festival.
