= Chester, Utah =

Unincorporated community in the state of Utah, United States

- Unincorporated community
- Location of Chester within the State of Utah Chester (Utah)
- Coordinates: 39°28′34″N 111°33′47″W
- Country: United States
- State: Utah
- County: Sanpete
- Founded by: David Candland
- Named after: Chesterfield
- Elevation: 5,515 ft (1,681 m)

Population (2000)
  - Total: 178
- Time zone: UTC-7 (Mountain (MST))
  - Summer (DST): UTC-6 (MDT)
- ZIP codes: 84623
- Area code: 435
- GNIS feature ID: 1439662

Chester is an unincorporated community in central Sanpete County, Utah, United States.

== Description ==
The community is located in the Sanpete Valley, 4 miles (6.4 km) west of Spring City at the junction of Utah State Route 132 (formerly SR-11 and U.S. Route 189) and Utah State Route 117. The population was 178 at the 2000 census.

Chester Ponds (a series of six small reservoirs) are located along the Canal and Oak creeks in the northeastern part of the community.

Historical population
Census	Pop.	Note	%±
1880	188		—
1890	259		37.8%
1900	270		4.2%
1910	279		3.3%
1920	256		−8.2%
1930	171		−33.2%
1940	192		12.3%
1950	153		−20.3%
2000	178		—
Source: U.S. Census Bureau

== History ==
Chester was founded by David Candland. In the beginning the town was named Canal Creek after the waterway from which the community received its water. Candland then changed the name to Chesterfield after his hometown in England; it was later reduced to Chester. Chester had its own post office until 1967.

In August 1885, the San Pete Valley Railway completed its tracks as far south as Chester and began regular service to Nephi (via Moroni and Fountain Green); however, passenger service was not offered until after the "Station House" was completed. The railway ran north–south through the western part of the community, at about 3300 East. The railway was acquired by Union Pacific Railroad in 1890 and extended farther south to Manti by 1984. The railway was taken over by the Denver & Rio Grande Railroad (D&RG) in 1908 and became known as the D&RG San Pete Valley Branch. The branch was later abandoned by the D&RG (by then known as the Denver and Rio Grande Western Railroad) in 1947, leaving the Marysvale Branch, through Spring City, as the nearest rail service.
