= Cody Larsen =

American football player (born 1987)

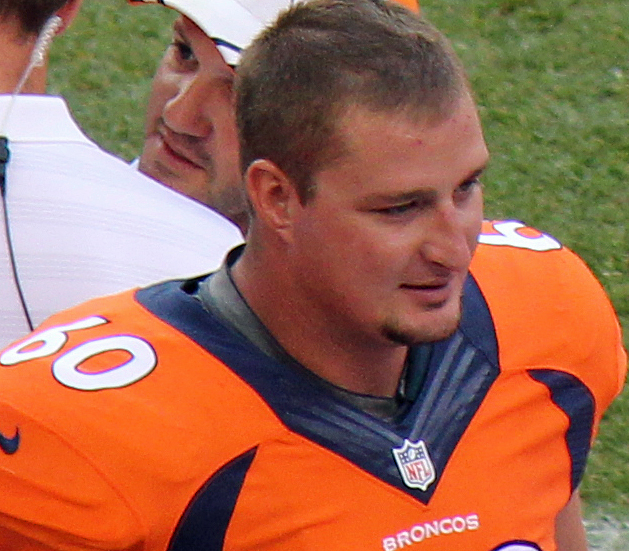
- Larsen in the 2014 NFL preseason

No. 69, 60
- Position: Defensive lineman

Personal information
- Born: December 31, 1987 (age 38); Draper, Utah
- Listed height: 6 ft 4 in (1.93 m)
- Listed weight: 300 lb (136 kg)

Career information
- High school: Sandy (UT) Jordan
- College: Southern Utah
- NFL draft: 2013: undrafted

Career history
- Baltimore Ravens (2013)*; Denver Broncos (2014)*
- * Offseason or practice squad member only
- Stats at Pro Football Reference

Cody Larsen (born December 31, 1987) is an American former football defensive tackle. He played college football at Southern Utah.

== Early life ==
He prepped at Utah's Jordan High School, where he earned all-state honors his junior and senior seasons and helped the Beet Diggers to a region title his senior year for Coach Alex Jacobsen. Also lettered in basketball. Parents are Barbara and LeRoy Larsen.

== College career ==
=== Southern Utah University ===
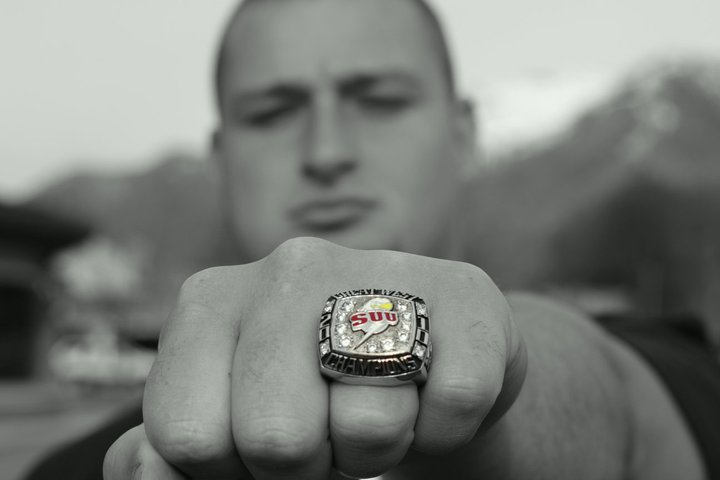
Cody shows off his 2010 Great West Conference Championship Ring

==== 2009 ====
Started all 11 games at defensive tackle, finished the season third among defensive linemen with 27 tackles, including 11 solo tackles. Had 2.5 tackles for loss (for 18 yards), two sacks (for 17 yards) and two quarterback hurries. Joined squad for spring drills.

==== 2010 ====
Started every game. Earned first-team all-GWC honors from the media and second-team recognition from the coaches last year after tallying 29 tackles, 25 solo, with 6.5 TFLs and four sacks from his nose guard spot. Also co-led the team with six QB hurries and earned academic all-GWC honors.

==== 2011 ====
Played in all 11 games with 10 starts, earned consensus first-team all-Great West Conference honors after tallying 26 tackles, 13 solo, including 7.5 TFLs and 6.0 sacks, also had an interception, three QB hurries, forced a fumble, recovered a fumble and blocked a kick. Earned GWC defensive Player of the Week honors after Northern Arizona game when he had 1.5 sacks among his five tackles.

== Professional career ==
=== Baltimore Ravens ===
On May 20, 2013, Larsen signed with the Baltimore Ravens as an undrafted free agent.

On December 30, 2013, he re-signed with the team on a futures contract.

=== Denver Broncos ===
On July 30, 2014, the Denver Broncos signed Larsen. The Broncos waived Larsen on August 25, 2014.

== Personal ==
Larsen's younger brother, Tyler, is a center that currently plays with the Washington Commanders of the National Football League.
