= Lee Udall Bennion =

American figurative painter (born 1956)

- Born: Lee Udall; March 17, 1956 (age 70); Merced, California, U.S.
- Education: Brigham Young University
- Known for: Figurative painting
- Spouse: Joseph Bennion
- Website: www.joeandleebennion.com

Lee Udall Bennion is an American painter. She is known for her portraiture and considered one of Utah's best artists.

== Early life and education ==
Lee Patricia Udall was born in Merced, California on 17 March 1956. She was the daughter of Dr Addison and Ada (née Webster) Udall. Udall attended Tenaya Middle School and Merced High School, graduating in 1974. Later that year, she went to Utah to attend Brigham Young University (BYU). She met and married Joseph Bennion in 1976 and graduated from BYU in 1984 with a bachelor's degree in fine arts.

== Career ==
Bennion's work is held in numerous collections and has been displayed at many galleries, including the Women Artist of Utah exhibition at the Springville Museum of Art in 1984, the Central Utah Arts Center in Ephraim in 1992, the Coda Gallery and Park City's Kimball Art Center in 1996, the St George Art Museum in 1999, and the Latter Day Saints Church History Museum in Salt Lake City in 2014.

Her painting "Winter Flowers" was purchased in 1988 by the Utah Arts Council for the state's art collection.

In 2002, Bennion was appointed by the Governor of Utah to a position on the board of the Utah Arts Council.

== Critical reception ==
The Manti Messenger said of her work "Most of Lee's paintings are portrait snapshots of deep emotional quality[...] she brings out an almost daydream quality of everyday events and thoughts.

In 1996, the Salt Lake City Tribune said of her exhibition at the Kimball Art Center "Her strength is evident when her subjects are alive with emotion and expectation."

== Personal life ==
Bennion and her husband met at BYU and moved to Spring City, Utah in 1977. They have 3 daughters.
