= Utah State Route 117 =

State highway in Utah, United States

State Route 117
- SR-117 highlighted in red

Route information
- Maintained by UDOT
- Length: 12.192 mi (19.621 km)
- Existed: as SR-30 in 1935, renumbered to SR-117 in 1966–present

Major junctions
- West end: 200 West in Wales
- East end: US 89 in Mt. Pleasant

Location
- Country: United States
- State: Utah

Highway system
- Utah State Highway System; Interstate; US; State; Minor; Scenic
← SR-116	→ SR-118

State Route 117 (SR-117) is a state highway in the U.S. state of Utah, connecting Wales and Mount Pleasant in Sanpete County. Running for 12.19 miles (19.62 km) as a two-lane highway, the road was originally placed under state jurisdiction in 1935 (as SR-30), but renumbered to its current designation in 1966.

== Route description ==
State Route 117 begins on 200 North at the intersection of 200 West in Wales, travelling east for two blocks before turning south on State Street. After less than 1 mile (1.6 km), it leaves the southern end of Wales, the road turns again to the east for approximately 7.4 miles (11.9 km), passing through the town of Chester and crossing US-89 before entering Spring City along 300 North. In Spring City, the route turns north on Main Street, turning to the northeast after about 0.5 miles (0.80 km), continuing this direction for about 3 miles (4.8 km) before terminating at US-89 in Mount Pleasant, directly opposite the Mount Pleasant Airport.

== History ==
This route was originally part of former State Route 30, a somewhat longer route which was designated as running from Fountain Green on former SR-11, south through Freedom and Wales, then east through Chester and Spring City, then northeast to former SR-32 (US-89) in Mount Pleasant.

In 1966, the counties in northern Utah requested that the State Road Commission designate a single route number to run east–west across that part of the state. Since Nevada's portion of the highway was numbered SR 30, Utah selected that number. As a result, in November 1966 the former State Route 30 was renumbered as State Route 117. Route 117 had been freed up four months prior in July when former SR-117 from Bicknell to Boulder was absorbed by former SR-54 (now part of SR-12).

In 1969, the legislature shortened the route by 9.925 miles (15.973 km), moving the western terminus from Fountain Green to Wales. After this change, the route has remained the same through the present day.

== Major intersections ==
The entire route is in Sanpete County.

Location	mi	km	Destinations	Notes
Wales	0.000	0.000	200 West	Western terminus
Chester	4.907	7.897	SR-132	
West of Spring City	7.145	11.499	US 89 (6200 East)	
Mt. Pleasant	12.192	19.621	US 89 (State Street)	Eastern terminus
1.000 mi = 1.609 km; 1.000 km = 0.621 mi
