= Utah State Route 116 =

State highway in Utah, United States

State Route 116

Route information
- Maintained by UDOT
- Length: 7.061 mi (11.364 km)
- Existed: 1931–present

Major junctions
- West end: SR-132 in Moroni
- East end: US 89 in Mount Pleasant

Location
- Country: United States
- State: Utah

Highway system
- Utah State Highway System; Interstate; US; State; Minor; Scenic
← SR-115	→ SR-117

State Route 116 (SR-116) is a 7.061-mile (11.364 km) long state highway in the U.S. state of Utah. Located entirely within Sanpete County, the route runs from SR-132 in Moroni to U.S. Route 89 in Mount Pleasant.

== Route description ==
SR-116 begins at an intersection with SR-132 in eastern Moroni. It serves as a continuation of Main Street as it exits Moroni. The route then turns northeast with farmland to the south and desert to the north. Turning back east, SR-116 crosses the San Pitch River, fields begin to appear north of the route. The highway then enters Mount Pleasant, taking on the name of Main Street and ending at US-89 in the center of the city.

== History ==
State Route 116 was first added to the state highway system in 1931, consisting of the current alignment but extending farther to the west through Moroni to the forest boundary at Maple Canyon. In 1933, the route was extended further west to the forks of Maple Canyon. In 1969, the route was truncated at its western end, relinquishing the roadway west of Moroni back to local jurisdiction, resulting in the present-day alignment.

== Major intersections ==
The entire route is in Sanpete County.

Location	mi	km	Destinations	Notes
Moroni	0.000	0.000	SR-132 (Main Street)	Western terminus
Mt. Pleasant	7.061	11.364	US 89 (Center Street)	Eastern terminus
1.000 mi = 1.609 km; 1.000 km = 0.621 mi
