= Tyler Larsen =

American football player (born 1991)

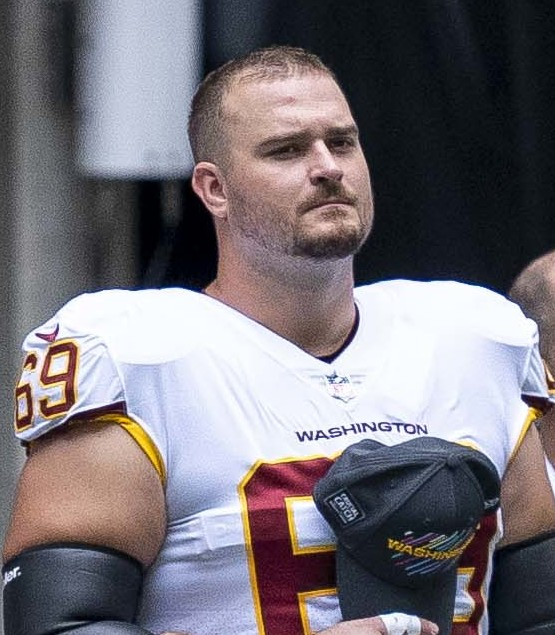
- Larsen with the Washington Football Team in 2021

Profile
- Position: Center

Personal information
- Born: July 8, 1991 (age 35); Salt Lake City, Utah, U.S.
- Listed height: 6 ft 4 in (1.93 m)
- Listed weight: 335 lb (152 kg)

Career information
- High school: Jordan (Sandy, Utah)
- College: Utah State
- NFL draft: 2014: undrafted

Career history
- Miami Dolphins (2014)*; Washington Redskins (2015)*; Carolina Panthers (2016–2020); Washington Football Team / Commanders (2021–2023)
- * Offseason or practice squad member only

Awards and highlights
- Second-team All-American (2013); First-team All-MWC (2013); 2× First-team All-WAC (2011, 2012)

Career NFL statistics
- Games played: 100
- Games started: 36
- Stats at Pro Football Reference

Tyler Larsen (born July 8, 1991) is an American professional football center. He played college football at Utah State. Larsen signed with the Miami Dolphins as an undrafted free agent in 2014 and has also been a member of the Carolina Panthers and Washington Commanders.

== Early life ==
Larsen attended Jordan High School in Sandy, Utah, where he played both offensive and defensive line. He earned first-team all-state and second-team all-region honors after recording 27 tackles, including six sacks as well as six fumble recoveries with four going for touchdowns as a senior. He helped lead the Beetdiggers to the state playoffs all four seasons, finishing career with 96 tackles, 16 sacks, 12 fumble recoveries, including four touchdowns. He is of Norwegian descent.

He was rated a two-star recruit by Rivals.com.

== College career ==
Larsen attended Utah State University and played for the Aggies from 2009 to 2013. As a freshman, he played in the first two games of the season before sustaining a season-ending knee injury and was granted a medical redshirt season. Returning in 2010, Larsen would go on to start 52 consecutive games at center for the Aggies, earning himself first-team All-Western Athletic Conference honors twice (2011, 2012) and first-team All-Mountain West in his final season. Larsen also made the watch lists for each the Rimington Trophy and the Outland Trophy his final 2 years (2012, 2013), and was nominated as a finalist for the Rimington Trophy in 2013.

== Professional career ==
=== Pre-draft ===
A three-time all-conference selection, Larsen was regarded as one of the best interior lineman prospects in the 2014 NFL draft. He was projected a late round draft selection.

Pre-draft measurables
| Height | Weight | Arm length | Hand span | 20-yard shuttle | Three-cone drill | Vertical jump | Broad jump | Bench press |
|---|---|---|---|---|---|---|---|---|
| 6 ft 3 5/8 in (1.92 m) | 313 lb (142 kg) | 31 1/2 in (0.80 m) | 9 1/4 in (0.23 m) | 4.70 s | 8.22 s | 23 1/2 in (0.60 m) | 8 ft 6 in (2.59 m) | 36 reps |
All values from NFL Combine

=== Miami Dolphins ===
Larsen signed with the Miami Dolphins after going undrafted in 2014. He was released on August 26, 2014.

=== Washington Redskins (first stint) ===
On February 10, 2015, Larsen signed with the Washington Redskins. He was waived for final roster cuts before the start of the regular season on September 5.

=== Carolina Panthers ===
The Carolina Panthers signed Larsen to a future deal on January 12, 2016. He was released on October 8, 2016, and re-signed to the practice squad on October 11. He was promoted back to the active roster on November 4, 2016. On November 4, 2016, Larsen had his first career start at center against the Seattle Seahawks after Ryan Kalil and Gino Gradkowski both suffered injuries. He finished the 2016 season as the Panthers' starting center.

In 2017, Larsen played in 14 games with 10 starts at center in place of the injured Ryan Kalil. On August 8, 2018, Larsen signed a two-year contract extension. Larsen was placed on the reserve/COVID-19 list by the team on October 16, 2020, and activated on November 4.

=== Washington Football Team / Commanders (second stint) ===
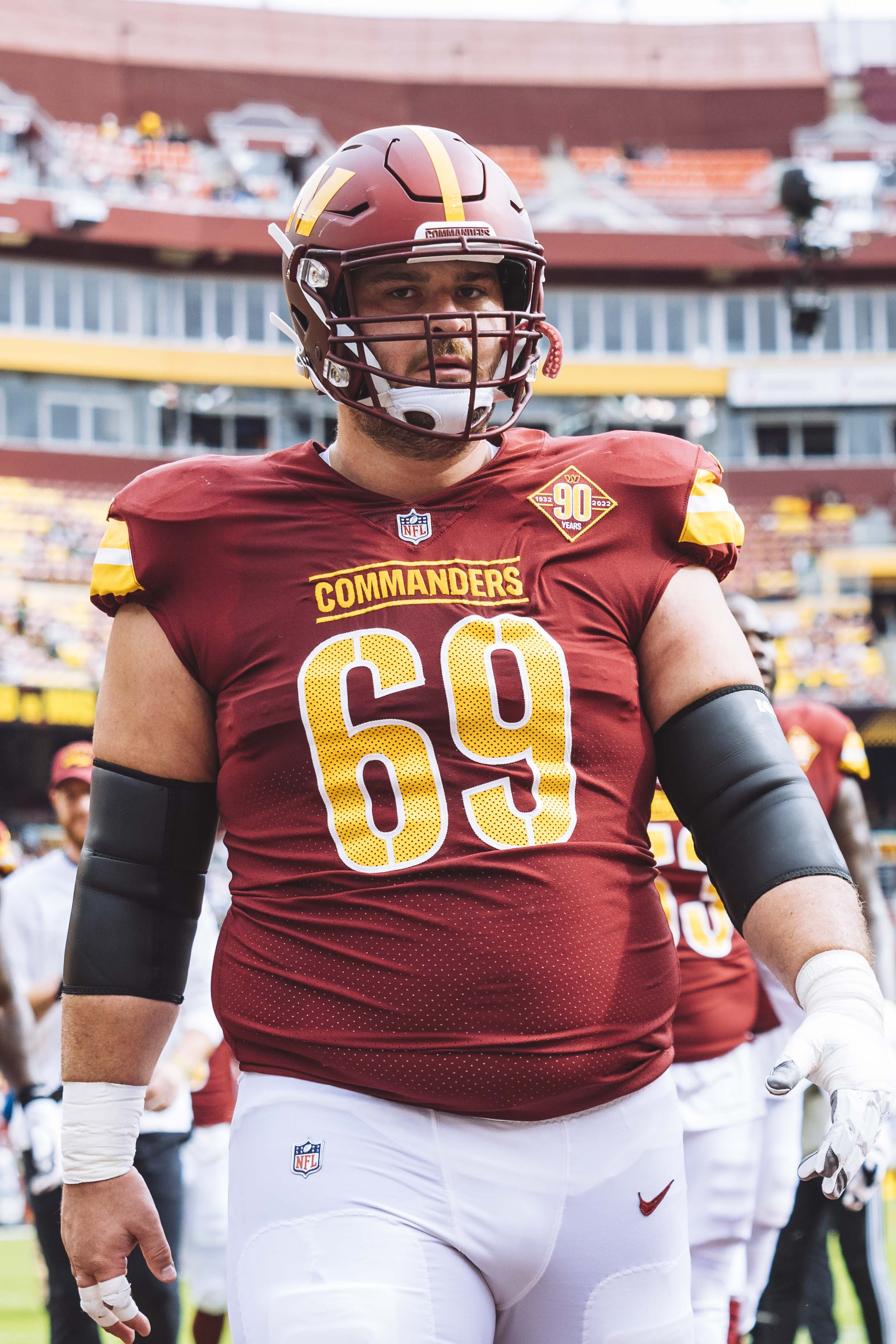
Larsen with the Washington Commanders in 2022

Larsen signed with the Washington Football Team on March 18, 2021. Larsen took over as the starting center in Week 10 after Chase Roullier was placed on injured reserve. In the Week 11 game against the Carolina Panthers, he left the game early due to injury. He missed the following two games. Larsen returned in the Week 14 loss against the Dallas Cowboys, but left the game in the fourth quarter after defensive tackle Neville Gallimore tackled both Larsen and quarterback Taylor Heinicke and Larsen was carted off the field. He was placed on injured reserve on December 27.

Larsen re-signed with the team on March 17, 2022. He was placed on the physically unable to perform list at the start of training camp in 2022 and returned to the active roster on October 8, 2022. In Week 6, Larsen took over as the starting center, replacing Nick Martin. In the Week 13 game against the New York Giants, Larsen was carted off the field with a dislocated kneecap in the fourth quarter. On December 12, he was placed on injured reserve.

On March 16, 2023, Larsen re-signed with the Commanders on another one-year contract. He was released on August 29, 2023, but re-signed two days later. In Week 8, Larsen was elevated to the starting center position, replacing Nick Gates. On December 30, the Commanders placed Larsen on injured reserve for the third consecutive season due to a knee injury.

== Personal ==
His brother, Cody Larsen, also played in the NFL.
