= Spring City, Utah =

City in Utah, United States

- City
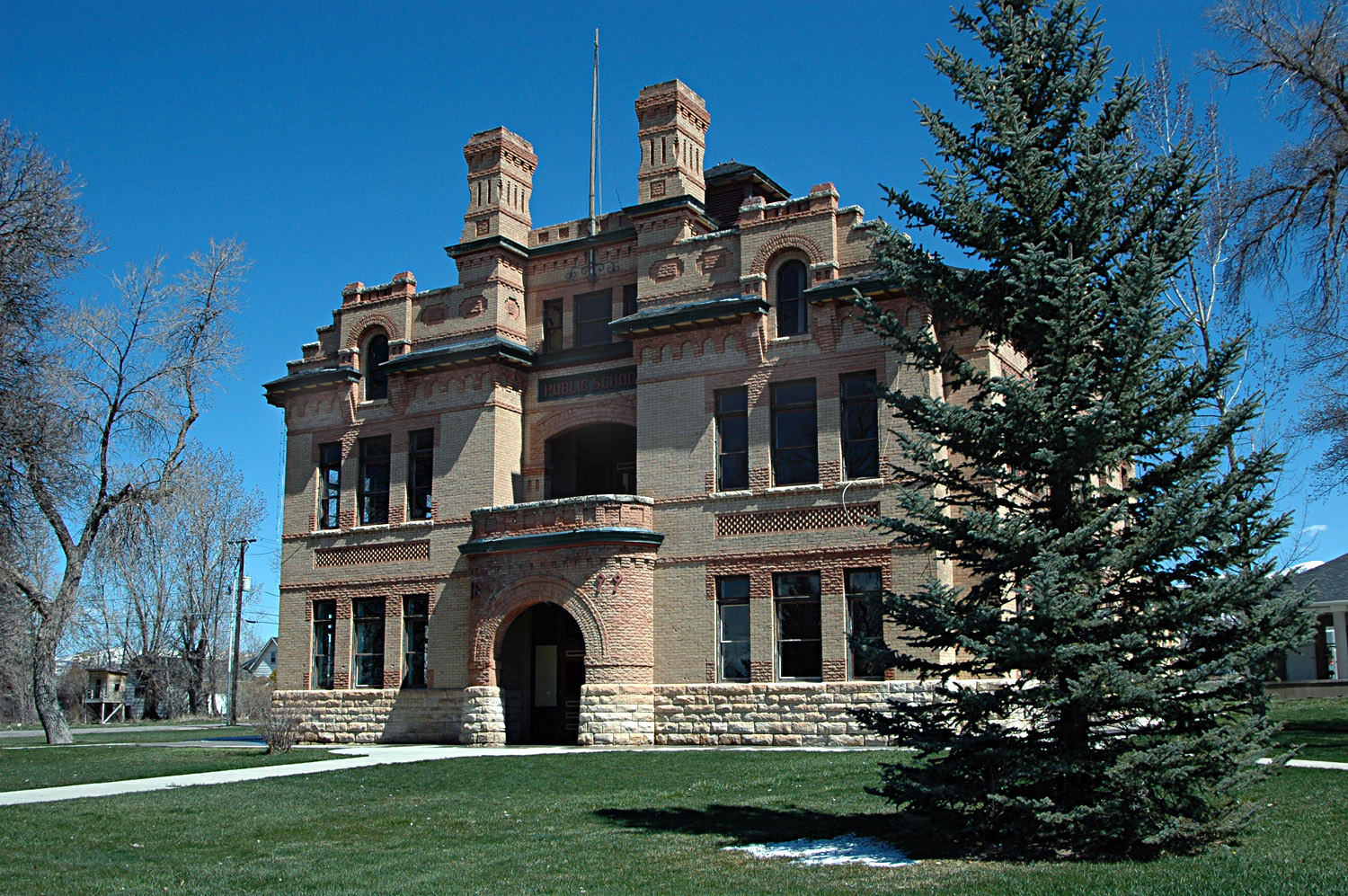
- Spring City School

- Location in Sanpete County and Utah
- Coordinates: 39.479889°N 111.491758°W
- Country: United States
- State: Utah
- County: Sanpete
- Settled: 1852
- Incorporated: February 11, 1870

Government
  - Type: Mayor and city council
  - Mayor: Paul Penrod (as of October 2026)

Area
  - Total: 1.41 sq mi (3.66 km^{2})
  - Land: 1.41 sq mi (3.66 km^{2})
  - Water: 0 sq mi (0 km^{2})

Population (2020)
  - Total: 949
  - Density: 672/sq mi (259/km^{2})
- Time zone: UTC−7 (Mountain)
  - Summer (DST): UTC−6 (MDT)
- ZIP Code: 84662
- Area code: 435
- FIPS code: 49-71730
- GNIS feature ID: 2411959
- Website: springcityutah.gov

Spring City is a city in Sanpete County, Utah, United States. Its population was 949 at the 2020 census. Most of the city is included in the Spring City Historic District, which is listed on the National Register of Historic Places as an example of the settlement planning and vernacular architecture of nineteenth-century Latter-day Saint communities. Since the late twentieth century, the city has also developed a community of visual artists and craftspeople.

== History ==
=== Indigenous history ===
The Sanpete Valley was inhabited by the San Pitch band of the Ute people. The Sanpitch Utes used the area around present-day Spring City for hunting and fishing before Latter-day Saint settlement.

=== Settlement and development ===
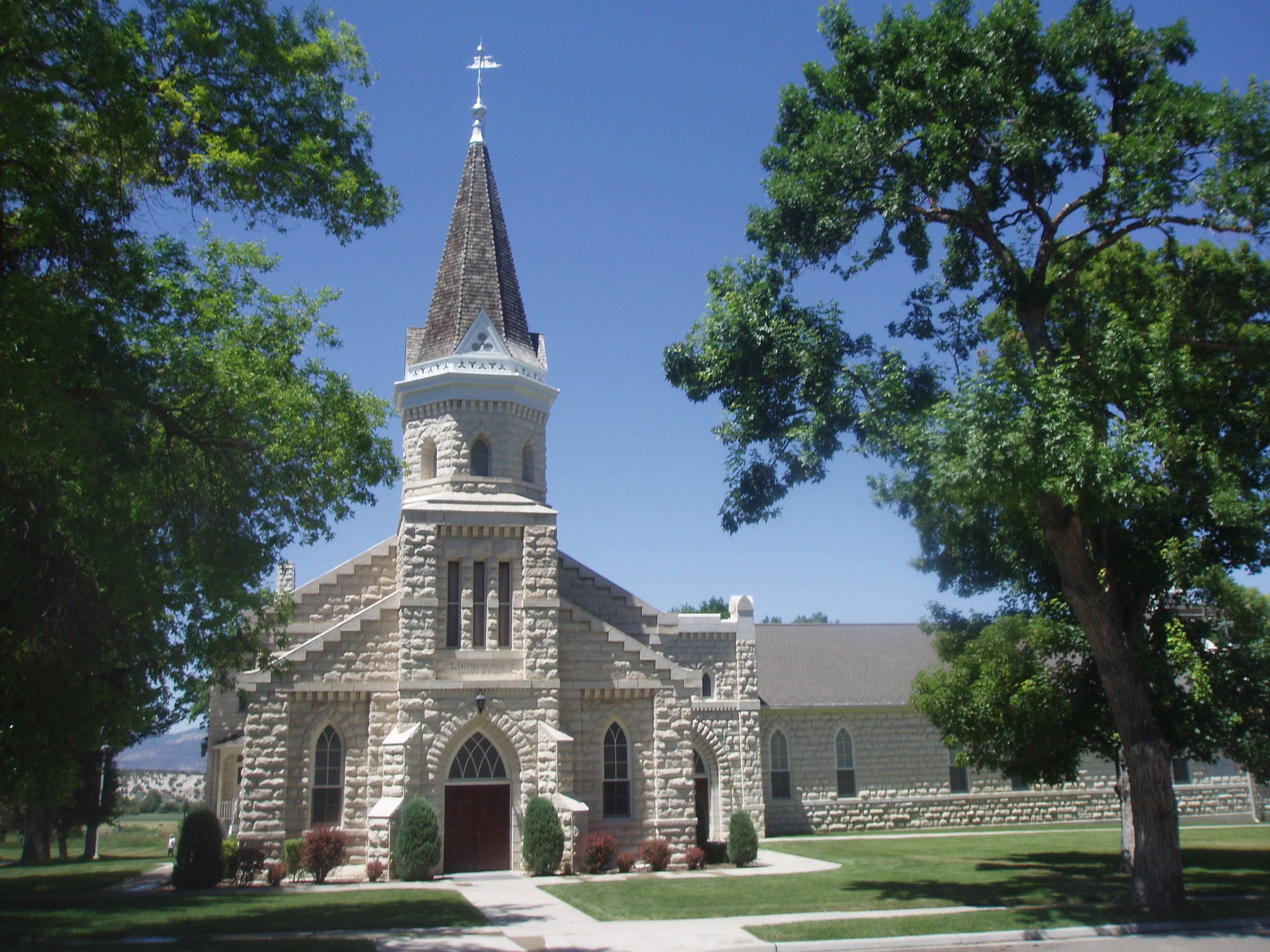
The Spring City meetinghouse, built in the early twentieth century and included in the historic district

Latter-day Saint settlers led by James Allred established a community along Canal Creek in 1852. Initially known as the Allred Settlement, it was abandoned during the 1850s amid conflict with Ute people and shortages of food. Settlers returned in 1859, and the community became known as Springtown and later Spring City.

Danish converts to the Church of Jesus Christ of Latter-day Saints formed a substantial part of the population. Their presence led to the informal names "Little Denmark" and "Little Copenhagen". Scandinavian and North American settlers worked as farmers and tradespeople and constructed buildings from locally available logs, adobe, and oolitic limestone. The town was laid out on a grid of broad streets and approximately one-acre lots, following the settlement pattern used by many Latter-day Saint communities in Utah.

Spring City was incorporated on February 11, 1870. Agriculture, stock raising, wool production, and lumbering formed the local economy. A railroad reached the Sanpete Valley in 1891, improving access to outside markets. The population exceeded 1,100 in 1900 but declined during much of the twentieth century. U.S. Route 89 was rerouted west of Spring City in 1957, reducing through traffic and commercial development. By 1970 the population had fallen to 456. The reduced development helped preserve the town plan and older building stock.

== Geography ==
Spring City viewed from the east in 1968, photographed for the Historic American Buildings Survey

Spring City lies in the northern Sanpete Valley beneath the Wasatch Plateau. Oak Creek and Canal Creek cross the community from canyons to the east. According to the Census Bureau's 2019 gazetteer, the city covers 1.411 square miles (3.65 km^{2}), all land.

=== Climate ===
The National Oceanic and Atmospheric Administration publishes 1991–2020 climate normals for a weather station at nearby Moroni. At that station, average daily maximum temperatures range from 38.1 °F (3.4 °C) in January to 89.0 °F (31.7 °C) in July, while average daily minimum temperatures range from 12.9 °F (−10.6 °C) in January to 52.0 °F (11.1 °C) in July. Normal annual precipitation is 12.55 inches (319 mm).

Climate data for Moroni, Utah (station USC00425837), 1991–2020 normals
Month	Jan	Feb	Mar	Apr	May	Jun	Jul	Aug	Sep	Oct	Nov	Dec	Year
Mean daily maximum °F (°C)	38.1 (3.4)	43.4 (6.3)	54.6 (12.6)	62.0 (16.7)	71.1 (21.7)	82.1 (27.8)	89.0 (31.7)	87.0 (30.6)	79.1 (26.2)	66.2 (19.0)	51.7 (10.9)	38.2 (3.4)	63.5 (17.5)
Daily mean °F (°C)	25.5 (−3.6)	30.6 (−0.8)	39.8 (4.3)	45.8 (7.7)	54.2 (12.3)	63.2 (17.3)	70.5 (21.4)	68.9 (20.5)	60.5 (15.8)	49.0 (9.4)	36.7 (2.6)	25.7 (−3.5)	47.5 (8.6)
Mean daily minimum °F (°C)	12.9 (−10.6)	17.7 (−7.9)	25.1 (−3.8)	29.6 (−1.3)	37.2 (2.9)	44.3 (6.8)	52.0 (11.1)	50.7 (10.4)	41.9 (5.5)	31.8 (−0.1)	21.7 (−5.7)	13.2 (−10.4)	31.5 (−0.3)
Average precipitation inches (mm)	1.10 (28)	1.14 (29)	1.01 (26)	1.19 (30)	1.26 (32)	0.71 (18)	0.86 (22)	0.91 (23)	1.02 (26)	1.24 (31)	0.95 (24)	1.16 (29)	12.55 (319)
Source: NOAA

== Demographics ==
Historical population
Census	Pop.	Note	%±
1860	243		—
1870	623		156.4%
1880	989		58.7%
1890	1,044		5.6%
1900	1,135		8.7%
1910	1,100		−3.1%
1920	1,106		0.5%
1930	902		−18.4%
1940	839		−7.0%
1950	703		−16.2%
1960	463		−34.1%
1970	456		−1.5%
1980	671		47.1%
1990	715		6.6%
2000	956		33.7%
2010	988		3.3%
2020	949		−3.9%
Spring City general plan; historic district documentation; U.S. Census Bureau

The 2020 census counted 949 residents and 414 housing units.

== Historic district and preservation ==
- Spring City Historic District
- U.S. National Register of Historic Places
- U.S. Historic district
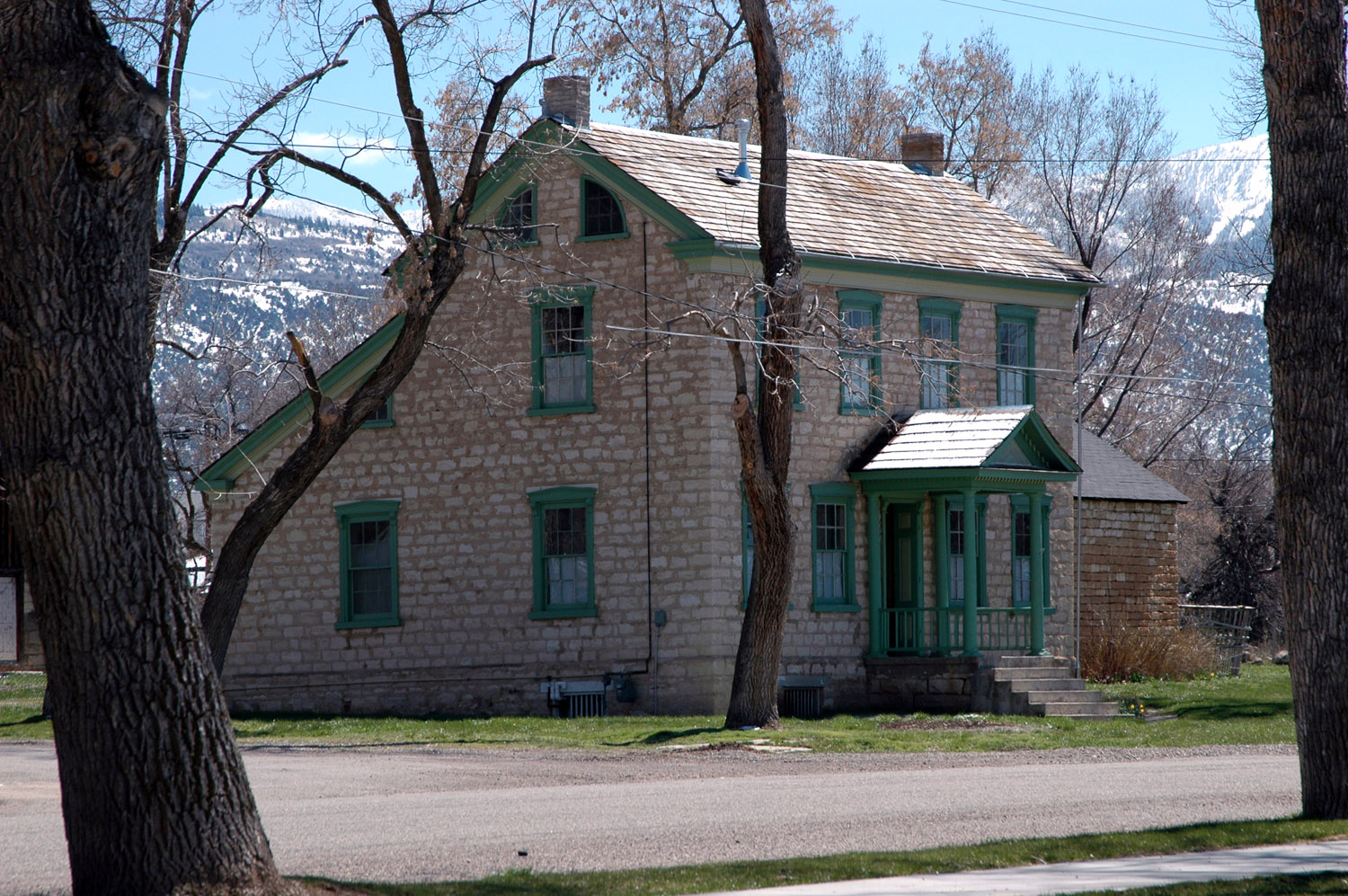
- A stone house in Spring City
- Location: Spring City, Sanpete County, Utah
- Area: 1,366 acres (553 ha) (2022 documentation)
- Architectural style: Vernacular, Greek Revival, Gothic Revival, Italianate, Victorian Eclectic
- NRHP reference No.: 80003957
- Added to NRHP: October 22, 1980

The Spring City Historic District was added to the National Register on October 22, 1980. Its significance includes settlement, agriculture, community planning, and architecture. The 2022 additional documentation describes a 1,366-acre (553 ha) district and a period of significance from 1859 to 1972. The survey recorded 496 buildings, structures, sites, and outbuildings, of which 290 contributed to the district's historic character.

The district contains log cabins and adobe buildings as well as numerous houses constructed from local oolitic limestone. Its architecture includes vernacular house forms brought by settlers and later examples influenced by pattern books, including Greek Revival, Gothic Revival, Victorian, and bungalow forms. The broad streets, large lots, houses, barns, granaries, and agricultural land preserve the relationship between the residential settlement and surrounding farms.

Friends of Historic Spring City formed in 1983 to support preservation within the district. Painter Lee Udall Bennion, potter Joseph Bennion, and other residents participated in the organization and its effort to preserve the former school. The group's projects have included grants for historic houses and outbuildings and restoration of the 1899 Spring City School and adjoining junior-high building for community use. Restoration of the school took about four decades and combined volunteer work, private fundraising, grants, and public financing.

== Arts and culture ==
Artists began moving to Spring City in the 1970s. The married artists Lee Udall Bennion and Joseph Bennion settled there in 1976; Joseph later established Horseshoe Mountain Pottery on Main Street. They were among the early professional artists in the community, and other painters, craftspeople, architects, and preservation specialists followed. Joseph Bennion helped organize Spring City Arts, an artists' membership nonprofit. In 2008, the organization operated a gallery and organized a plein-air painting competition and studio tour.

Heritage Day, held on Memorial Day weekend, includes tours of historic houses and art events. Proceeds have supported local preservation projects.

== Government ==
Spring City's elected officials consist of a mayor and five city council members. As of October 2026, the mayor is Paul Penrod.

== Education and infrastructure ==
Spring City Elementary is part of the North Sanpete School District.

Utah State Route 117 runs from Wales through Chester and Spring City to U.S. Route 89. In Spring City, the route follows northern Main Street and turns west to reach US 89.

The city operates an electric utility and a small hydroelectric plant at the mouth of Oak Creek Canyon.

== Notable people ==
- Joseph Bennion, potter
- Lee Udall Bennion, painter
- Orson Hyde, Latter-day Saint leader
- Jacob Johnson, judge

== See also ==
- National Register of Historic Places listings in Sanpete County, Utah
