= Utah State Route 132 =

State highway in Utah, United States

State Route 132
- SR-132 highlighted in red

Route information
- Maintained by UDOT
- Length: 63.132 mi (101.601 km)
- Existed: 1933–present

Major junctions
- West end: US 6 in Lynndyl
- SR-28 in Nephi; I-15 in Nephi
- East end: US 89 at Pigeon Hollow Junction

Location
- Country: United States
- State: Utah

Highway system
- Utah State Highway System; Interstate; US; State; Minor; Scenic
← SR-131	→ SR-133

State Route 132 (SR-132) is a 63.132-mile-long (101.601 km) state highway in the U.S. state of Utah. It connects U.S. Route 6 (US-6) in Lynndyl to US-89 at Pigeon Hollow Junction, crossing Interstate 15 (I-15) in Nephi.

== Route description ==
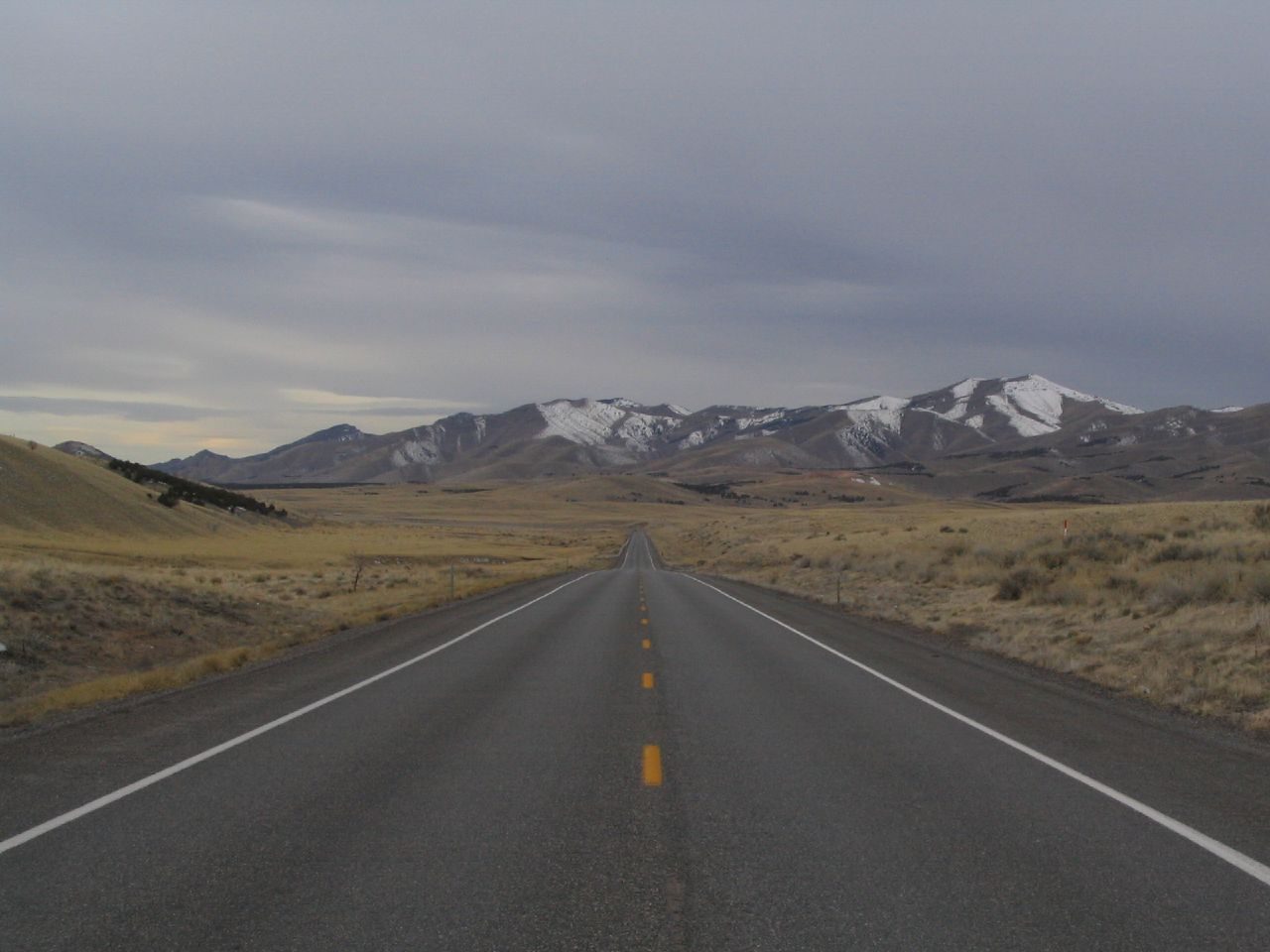
SR-132 between Lynndyl and Nephi

The route starts in Millard County at US-6 in Lynndyl, north of Delta and south of Little Sahara Recreation Area, and travels east through Leamington before turning northeast and entering Juab County. The route continues northeast, crossing the Sevier River, gradually turning east before entering Nephi and crossing I-15. Leaving Nephi, the route enters Salt Creek Canyon, where it intersects the Nebo Loop Scenic Byway, before turning southeast, entering Sanpete County. From here, the route turns south-southeast, passing through Fountain Green and Moroni, after which the route turns south through Chester before ending at the intersection with US-89. The stretch of the route from Nephi to the US-89 junction is also used as the primary route connecting Snow College in Ephraim as well as Manti to the Wasatch Front.

== History ==
The route was formally established in 1933 with the purpose of connecting Nephi to US-50, which is now US-6. In 1945, the route was swapped with SR-148, forming the present route west of Nephi. In 1969, the route was extended east to Pigeon Hollow Junction along a roadway that had been signed as U.S. Route 189 in the 1930s.

The road from US-91 (now SR-28) in Nephi to and beyond Pigeon Hollow Junction was added to the state highway system in 1910, and became part of State Route 11 in the 1920s. As the part south of Pigeon Hollow Junction was (and still is) marked as US-89, the Nephi-Pigeon Hollow Junction connection was marked as a branch, US-189, from about 1930 until 1938 (when a new US-189 was created).

West of Nephi, State Route 132 was formed in 1933 to connect Nephi to US-50 (now US-6) near Jericho. State Route 148 was also formed at that time, connecting US-50 in Lynndyl to Leamington, and two years later it was extended to meet SR-132 west of Nephi. SR-132 and SR-148 were swapped in 1945, giving SR-132 its current route west of Nephi. SR-148 was removed from the state highway system in 1969, and at the same time, SR-132 was extended east to Pigeon Hollow Junction, replacing part of SR-11. (The next piece to the south became part of SR-32.)

== Major intersections ==
County	Location	mi	km	Destinations	Notes
Millard	Lynndyl	0.000	0.000	US 6 – Delta	Western terminus
Millard	Leamington	5.358	8.623	SR-125 south (300 West) – Oak City	
Juab	Nephi	33.223	53.467	SR-28 (Main Street) – Mona	
Juab	Nephi	34.207– 34.318	55.051– 55.229	I-15 – St. George, Provo	
Sanpete	Moroni	55.843	89.871	SR-116 west	
Sanpete	Chester	59.309	95.449	SR-117 west (14000 North) – Wales	
Sanpete	Pigeon Hollow Junction	63.132	101.601	US 89 – Manti, Mount Pleasant	Eastern terminus
1.000 mi = 1.609 km; 1.000 km = 0.621 mi
