= Moroni, Utah =

City in Utah, United States

- City
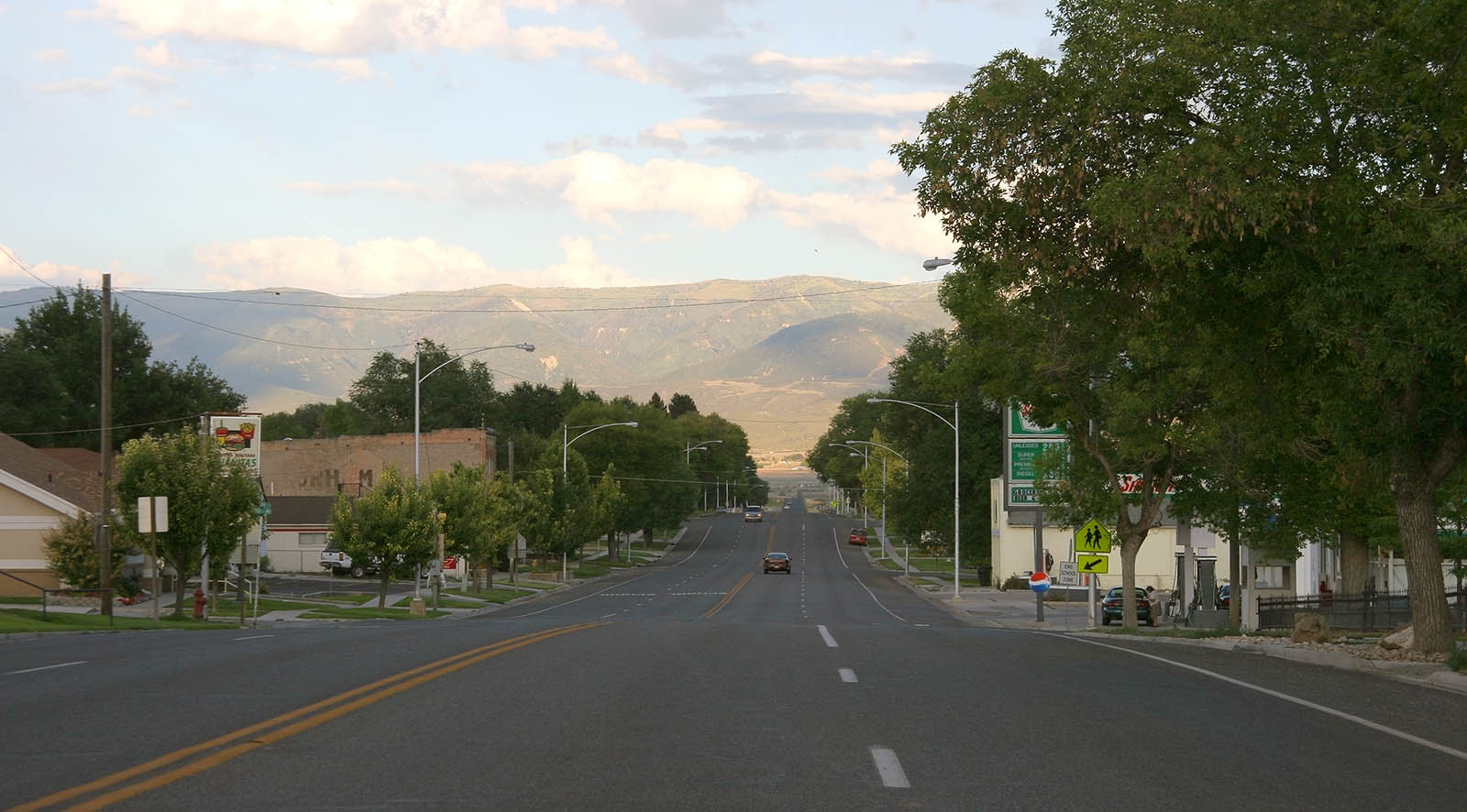
- View looking east on Main Street (State Route 116/132)

- Location in Sanpete County and the state of Utah.
- Coordinates: 39°31′41″N 111°34′59″W
- Country: United States
- State: Utah
- County: Sanpete
- Named for: Moroni

Area
  - Total: 1.07 sq mi (2.76 km^{2})
  - Land: 1.07 sq mi (2.76 km^{2})
  - Water: 0 sq mi (0.00 km^{2})
- Elevation: 5,532 ft (1,686 m)

Population (2020)
  - Total: 1,544
  - Density: 1,448.9/sq mi (559.42/km^{2})
- Time zone: UTC-7 (Mountain (MST))
  - Summer (DST): UTC-6 (MDT)
- ZIP code: 84646
- Area code: 435
- FIPS code: 49-52130
- GNIS feature ID: 1430498
- Website: moronicity.gov

Moroni (/məˈroʊnaɪ/ mə-ROH-ny) is a city in Sanpete County, Utah, United States. The population was 1,544 at the 2020 census.

== Name ==
The city is named after Moroni, a prophet in the beliefs of the Church of Jesus Christ of Latter-day Saints (Mormons).

== History ==
Moroni, Utah was founded by George Washington Bradley in 1859. That same year George Washington Bradley became the bishop of Moroni and held that position for 18 years.

== Geography ==
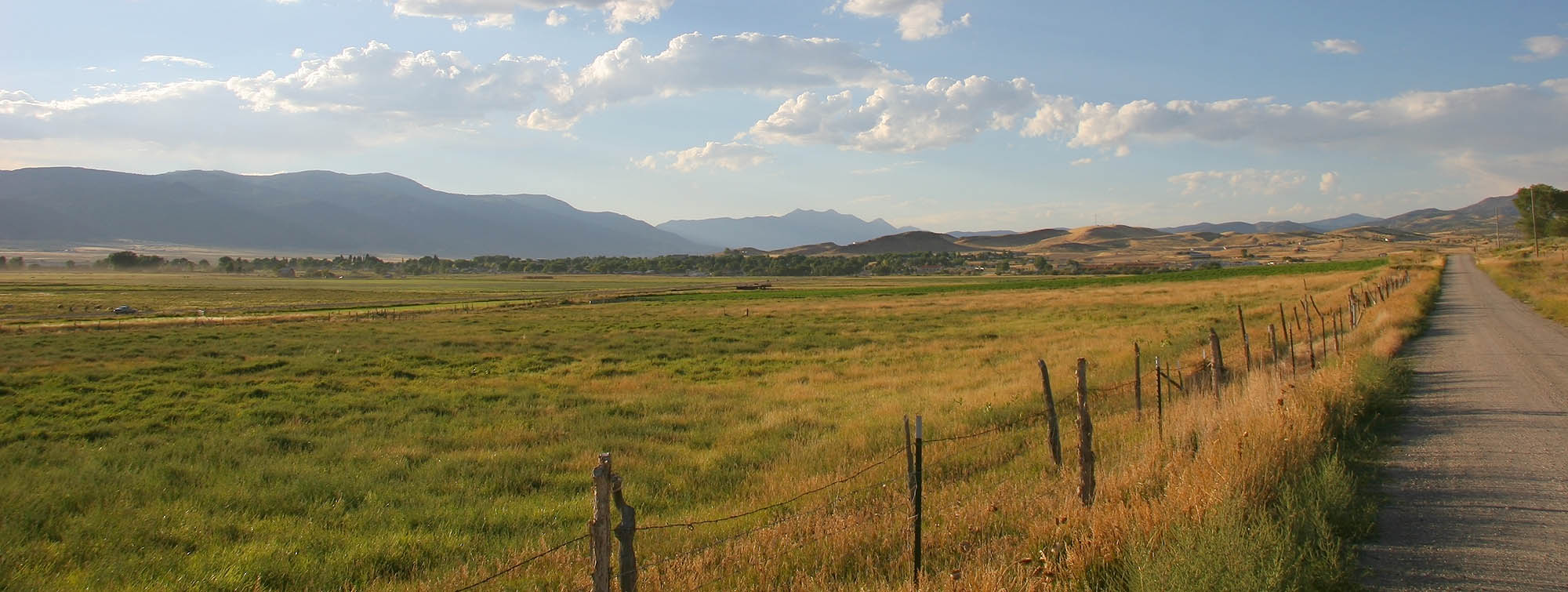
Panoramic view of Moroni, Utah, from the southeast

According to the United States Census Bureau, the city has a total area of 1.1 square miles (2.8 km^{2}), all land.

=== Climate ===
This climatic region is typified by large seasonal temperature differences, with warm to hot summers and cold (sometimes severely cold) winters. In addition, the diurnal temperature variation is very large year-round. According to the Köppen climate classification system, Moroni has a humid continental climate, Dfb on climate maps, bordering a cold semi-arid climate (BSk).

Climate data for Moroni, Utah, 1991–2020 normals, extremes 1910–present
| Month | Jan | Feb | Mar | Apr | May | Jun | Jul | Aug | Sep | Oct | Nov | Dec | Year |
|---|---|---|---|---|---|---|---|---|---|---|---|---|---|
| Record high °F (°C) | 66 (19) | 69 (21) | 80 (27) | 89 (32) | 94 (34) | 102 (39) | 107 (42) | 103 (39) | 99 (37) | 89 (32) | 79 (26) | 66 (19) | 107 (42) |
| Mean maximum °F (°C) | 50.7 (10.4) | 56.0 (13.3) | 69.3 (20.7) | 77.0 (25.0) | 84.2 (29.0) | 91.7 (33.2) | 96.3 (35.7) | 93.9 (34.4) | 89.3 (31.8) | 80.2 (26.8) | 66.9 (19.4) | 53.3 (11.8) | 96.8 (36.0) |
| Mean daily maximum °F (°C) | 38.1 (3.4) | 43.4 (6.3) | 54.6 (12.6) | 62.0 (16.7) | 71.1 (21.7) | 82.1 (27.8) | 89.0 (31.7) | 87.0 (30.6) | 79.1 (26.2) | 66.2 (19.0) | 51.7 (10.9) | 38.2 (3.4) | 63.5 (17.5) |
| Daily mean °F (°C) | 25.5 (−3.6) | 30.6 (−0.8) | 39.8 (4.3) | 45.8 (7.7) | 54.2 (12.3) | 63.2 (17.3) | 70.5 (21.4) | 68.9 (20.5) | 60.5 (15.8) | 49.0 (9.4) | 36.7 (2.6) | 25.7 (−3.5) | 47.5 (8.6) |
| Mean daily minimum °F (°C) | 12.9 (−10.6) | 17.7 (−7.9) | 25.1 (−3.8) | 29.6 (−1.3) | 37.2 (2.9) | 44.3 (6.8) | 52.0 (11.1) | 50.7 (10.4) | 41.9 (5.5) | 31.8 (−0.1) | 21.7 (−5.7) | 13.2 (−10.4) | 31.5 (−0.3) |
| Mean minimum °F (°C) | −5.2 (−20.7) | 1.4 (−17.0) | 11.3 (−11.5) | 18.9 (−7.3) | 25.5 (−3.6) | 33.6 (0.9) | 42.0 (5.6) | 41.6 (5.3) | 29.4 (−1.4) | 18.1 (−7.7) | 7.0 (−13.9) | −5.6 (−20.9) | −9.5 (−23.1) |
| Record low °F (°C) | −30 (−34) | −30 (−34) | −8 (−22) | 9 (−13) | 15 (−9) | 24 (−4) | 30 (−1) | 28 (−2) | 15 (−9) | −1 (−18) | −13 (−25) | −27 (−33) | −30 (−34) |
| Average precipitation inches (mm) | 1.10 (28) | 1.14 (29) | 1.01 (26) | 1.19 (30) | 1.26 (32) | 0.71 (18) | 0.86 (22) | 0.91 (23) | 1.02 (26) | 1.24 (31) | 0.95 (24) | 1.16 (29) | 12.55 (319) |
Source: NOAA

== Demographics ==
=== 2020 census ===
As of the 2020 census, Moroni had a population of 1,544. The median age was 29.6 years. 33.5% of residents were under the age of 18 and 15.2% of residents were 65 years of age or older. For every 100 females there were 105.9 males, and for every 100 females age 18 and over there were 104.4 males age 18 and over.

0.0% of residents lived in urban areas, while 100.0% lived in rural areas.

There were 472 households in Moroni, of which 47.5% had children under the age of 18 living in them. Of all households, 66.5% were married-couple households, 14.0% were households with a male householder and no spouse or partner present, and 16.1% were households with a female householder and no spouse or partner present. About 15.3% of all households were made up of individuals and 9.7% had someone living alone who was 65 years of age or older.

There were 497 housing units, of which 5.0% were vacant. The homeowner vacancy rate was 0.0% and the rental vacancy rate was 1.0%.

Racial composition as of the 2020 census
| Race | Number | Percent |
|---|---|---|
| White | 1,090 | 70.6% |
| Black or African American | 0 | 0.0% |
| American Indian and Alaska Native | 6 | 0.4% |
| Asian | 2 | 0.1% |
| Native Hawaiian and Other Pacific Islander | 39 | 2.5% |
| Some other race | 283 | 18.3% |
| Two or more races | 124 | 8.0% |
| Hispanic or Latino (of any race) | 475 | 30.8% |

=== 2000 census ===
As of the census of 2000, there were 1,280 people, 399 households, and 316 families residing in the city. The population density was 1,194.1 people per square mile (461.9/km^{2}). There were 430 housing units at an average density of 401.1 per square mile (155.2/km^{2}). The racial makeup of the city was 82.58% White, 0.23% African American, 0.31% Native American, 0.08% Asian, 0.62% Pacific Islander, 12.03% from other races, and 4.14% from two or more races. Hispanic or Latino of any race were 20.55% of the population.

There were 399 households, out of which 46.4% had children under the age of 18 living with them, 68.2% were married couples living together, 8.0% had a female householder with no husband present, and 20.6% were non-families. 19.3% of all households were made up of individuals, and 14.3% had someone living alone who was 65 years of age or older. The average household size was 3.21 and the average family size was 3.70.

In the city, the population was spread out, with 35.5% under the age of 18, 10.2% from 18 to 24, 21.1% from 25 to 44, 20.2% from 45 to 64, and 13.0% who were 65 years of age or older. The median age was 28 years. For every 100 females, there were 100.3 males. For every 100 females age 18 and over, there were 93.9 males.

The median income for a household in the city was $32,375, and the median income for a family was $39,583. Males had a median income of $30,739 versus $21,875 for females. The per capita income for the city was $12,527. About 8.8% of families and 12.5% of the population were below the poverty line, including 14.2% of those under age 18 and 13.6% of those age 65 or over.

== Education ==
Moroni is in the North Sanpete School District, and has an elementary school and North Sanpete Middle School. Students attend North Sanpete High School in Mount Pleasant.
