= John Boyden House =

- U.S. National Register of Historic Places
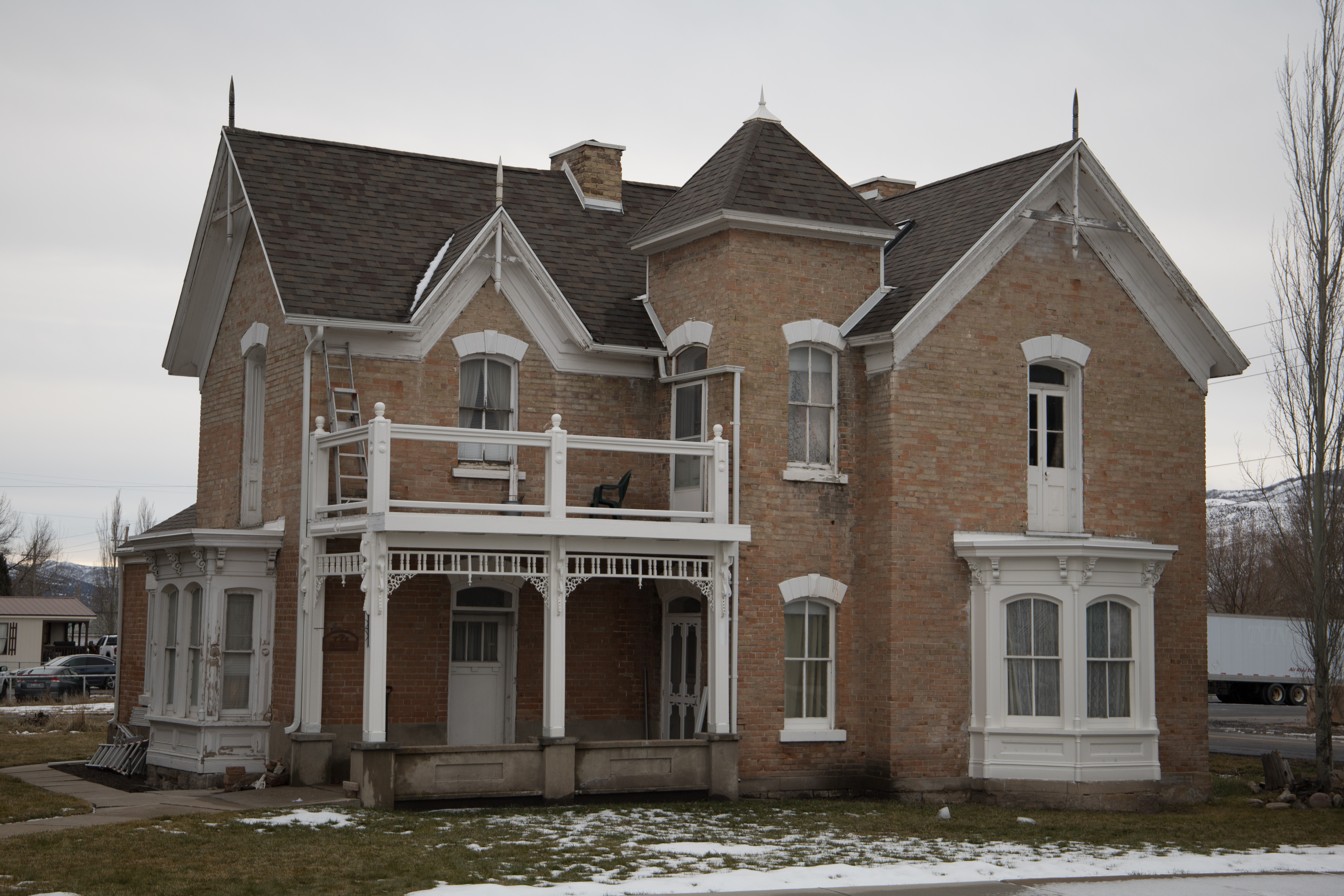

- Location within Utah Location within the United States
- Location: 47 W. Center St., Coalville, Utah
- Coordinates: 40°54′53″N 111°23′53″W
- Area: less than one acre
- Built: 1860
- Architectural style: Gothic Revival, Victorian
- NRHP reference No.: 82004162
- Added to NRHP: February 11, 1982

The John Boyden House, at 47 W. Center St. in Coalville, Utah, was built in 1860. It was listed on the National Register of Historic Places in 1982.

It includes Gothic Revival and Victorian architecture.

== See also ==
- Boyden Block, also NRHP-listed in Coalville
