= Boyden Block =

- U.S. National Register of Historic Places
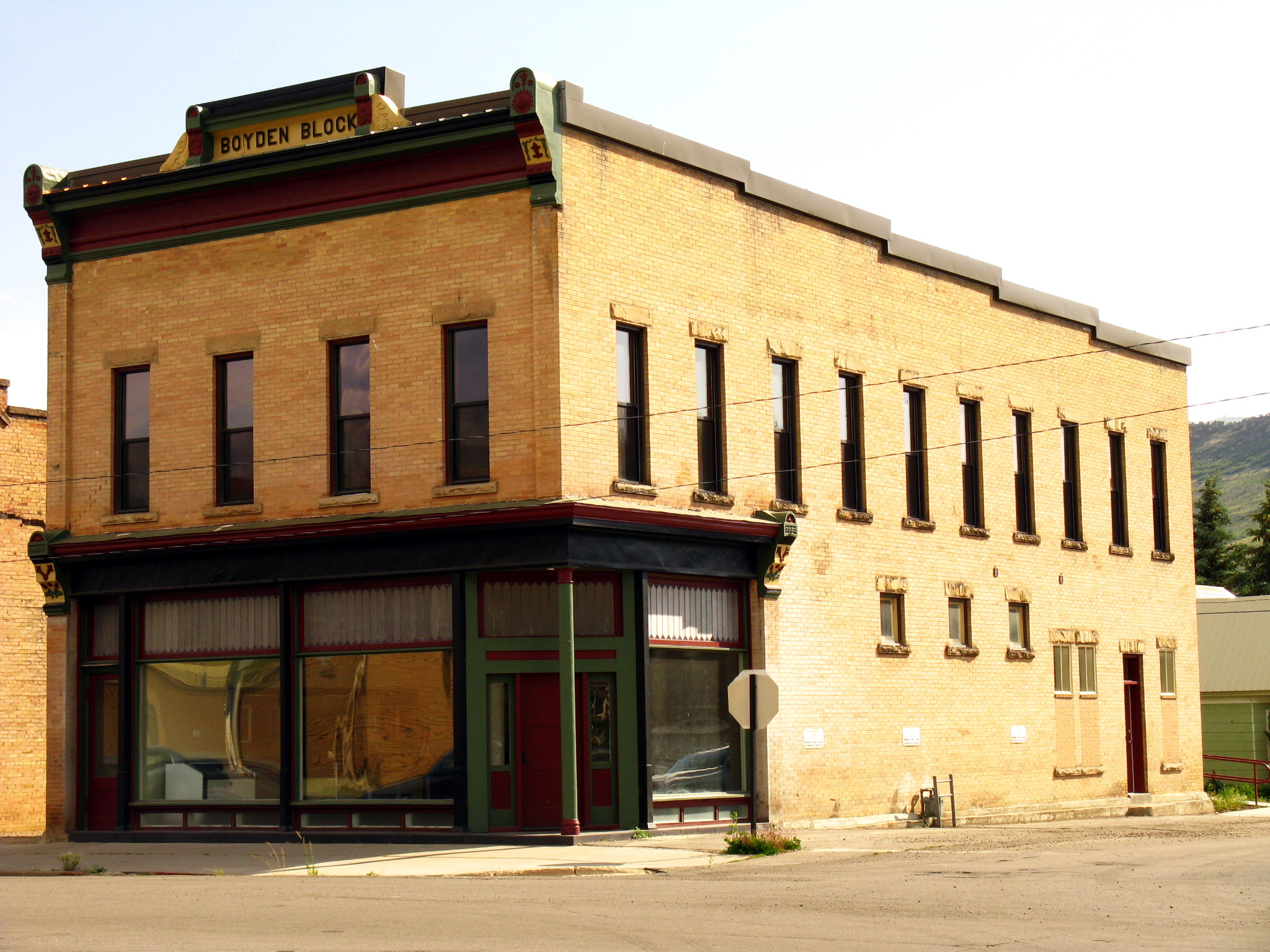

- Location within Utah Location within the United States
- Location: 2 S. Main St., Coalville, Utah
- Coordinates: 40°55′05″N 111°23′56″W
- Area: 0.4 acres (0.16 ha)
- Built: 1906
- Architectural style: Late Victorian, Early Commercial
- NRHP reference No.: 09000019
- Added to NRHP: February 6, 2009

The Boyden Block, at 2 S. Main St. in Coalville, Utah, was built in 1906. It has also been known as Boyden Drugstore, The Hat Box, and Boyden Law Office. The building features Late Victorian and Early Commercial architecture. It was listed on the National Register of Historic Places in 2009.

John Boyden, a lawyer in Coalville, was involved in land negotiations with Native Americans. Well after his death, he has been criticized for his performance, involving "Boyden's betrayal of the Hopi through a blatant conflict of interest".

== See also ==
- John Boyden House, also NRHP-listed in Coalville
