= Treaty of Limits (Mexico–United States) =

1828 treaty between Mexico and the United States

Original Mexico-US border

The Treaty of Limits between the United Mexican States and the United States of America is an 1828 treaty between Mexico and the United States that confirmed the borders between the two states. The Treaty of Limits was the first treaty concluded between the two countries.

The Treaty of Limits was concluded on 12 January 1828 at Mexico City. Joel Roberts Poinsett signed the treaty for the United States and Sebastián Camacho and José Ignacio Esteva for Mexico. The treaty recognized the Mexico–U.S. boundary that had been established by the 1819 Adams–Onís Treaty between Spain and the U.S.

The Treaty of Limits was ratified by Mexico and the U.S. and it entered into force on 5 April 1832. The treaty was amended in 1831 and again in 1835. After the Republic of Texas became independent from Mexico, the U.S. and Texas signed an 1838 treaty confirming the boundary from the Treaty of Limits.

However, when the U.S. recognized the independence of the Republic of Texas in 1836, Mexico regarded it as a violation of the Treaty of Limits; this sentiment was made worse by the 1845 annexation of Texas, which led to the Mexican–American War. After the war, the Treaty of Guadalupe Hidalgo established a new boundary between the two countries and thereby replaced the Treaty of Limits.

In United States v. Texas (162 U.S. 1 (1896)), a case involving a dispute between Texas and the United States over Greer County, the United States Supreme Court held that the Adams–Onís Treaty and the Treaty of Limits, as accepted by the Republic of Texas, definitively set the boundary between Texas and the Oklahoma Territory of the United States.

== Bibliography ==
- Gayarré, Charles (1854). "History of Louisiana" [The French Domination Vol. I]. Internet Archive. New York: Redfield. OCLC 680287472.
- Gayarré, Charles (1854). "History of Louisiana" [The French Domination Vol. II]. Internet Archive. New York: Redfield. OCLC 680287472.
- Gayarré, Charles (1866). History of Louisiana [The American Domination]. CIHM/ICMH Microfiche. New York: William J. Widdleton. hdl:2027/aeu.ark:/13960/t1jh4d231. ISBN 9780665450952. OCLC 890744434. ;
- Gayarré, Charles (1867). "History of Louisiana" [The Spanish Domination]. Internet Archive. New York: William J. Widdleton. OCLC 894823693.
- Bancroft, Hubert Howe (January 1, 1884). "History of North Mexican States and Texas Vol. I 1531-1800". Internet Archive. A. L. Bancroft & Company.
- Bancroft, Hubert Howe (January 1, 1889). "History of the North Mexican States and Texas Vol. II 1801-1889". Internet Archive. The History Company.
- Green, Thomas Marshall (1891). "The Spanish Conspiracy: A Review of Early Spanish Movements in the South-west". Internet Archive. Robert Clark & Company. OCLC 1157704371.
- Cox, Isaac Joslin (1906). "The Louisiana-Texas Frontier" [The Southwestern Historical Quarterly 1906-07: Volume 10, Issue 1.]. The Quarterly of the Texas State Historical Association. 10 (1). Texas State Historical Association: 1–75. JSTOR 30242910.
- Manning, William R. (1914). "Texas and The Boundary Issue, 1822-1829" [The Southwestern Historical Quarterly 1914-01: Volume 17, Issue 3.]. The Southwestern Historical Quarterly. 17 (3). Texas State Historical Association: 217–261. JSTOR 30234600.
