= Seuvarits Utes =

Band of the Northern Ute Native American tribe

The Seuvarits Utes (also known as Shai-var-its, Sheberetch, Sayhehpeech, Squawbush Water People, Elk Mountain Utes, or Green River Utes) are a band of the Northern Ute tribe of Native Americans that traditionally inhabited the area surrounding present-day Moab, Utah, near the Grand River (present-day Colorado River) and the Green River. The Seuvarits were among the Ute bands that were involved in the Black Hawk War. The Seuvarits and other Ute bands were eventually relocated onto reservations by the United States government after their population severely declined after exposure to disease and war during the latter half of the 19th century.

== Overview ==
The Seuvarits lived in dry, arid, and desert-like biomes, which greatly influenced their traditions and culture. They roamed the areas east and west of the La Sal Mountains, drawing upon the resources of the nearby Grand River (present-day Colorado River) and its tributary, the Green River. Contact with Mormons, otherwise known as Latter-day Saints (LDS) or members of the Church of Jesus Christ of Latter-day Saints, exposed the Seuvarits people to disease. Due to this disease and the effects of war, the Seuvarits band decreased in population and eventually combined with other Native American tribes (Moanunt, San Pitch, Timpanogos, Koosharem, and others) to become known as Uintah Utes by government officials after 1873. These combined peoples were relocated to the Uintah and Ouray Indian Reservation in Eastern Utah, where they reside to the present day. Because the Seuvarits lived on dry, arid lands, they did not use horses or rear them to any notable number until after the 1860s. The Seuvarits band of Utes is classified as part of the Northern Ute people.

== Lifestyle and culture ==
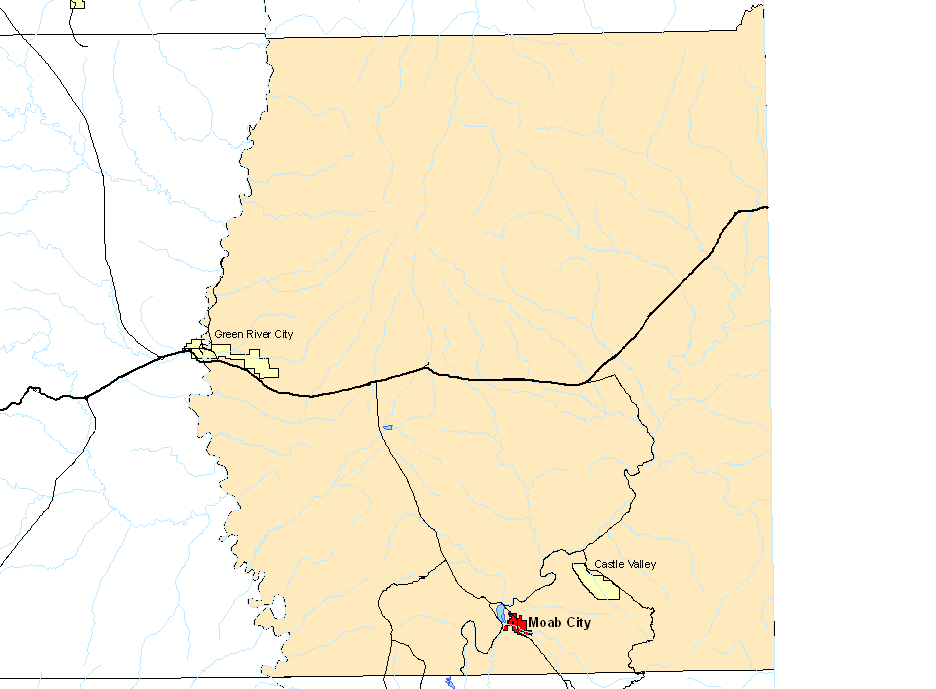
Present-day Grand County, Utah, historic homeland of the Seuvarits Utes.

The shared language between the Seuvarits and the rest of the Ute Indian tribe is Shoshonean. Shoshonean is a dialect of Uto-Aztecan. The peoples who speak Shoshonean previously separated from tribes who speak Uto-Aztecan.

To more easily travel the broad region of the Great Basin, larger bands would break into smaller family units in order to move more quickly and efficiently. Food, being an essential component for survival, was broken up into hunting and gathering sites by the Ute bands. After a period of time, the bands would move on to the next site, giving the environment time to naturally replenish its resources. The men of the band hunted elk, deer, and antelope. All parts of the animal were used, for example hides for clothing and tipi covers and antlers and bones for tools or beads. Specifically, the Seuvarits Utes would hunt antelope during the fall and winter months. The Seuvarits people tended to avoid the nearby Book Cliffs due to their desolate nature and relied on the Green River and Grand River (present-day Colorado River) for food and resources.

Women took on the role of trapping smaller game and gathering plant life such as amaranth, wild onion, and ricegrass native to the Great Basin. It is unknown what plant life the Seuvarits band picked specifically due to their more desert-oriented lifestyle. The women's beautiful quillwork-decorated clothing and cradleboards became well known.

Prior to the introduction of the horse and contact with white settlers, Ute bands including the Seuvarits used tools made of wood and stone. These included bows and arrows, baskets, throwing sticks, etc. The Seuvarits people traded with surrounding tribes and bands for various other items like pottery.

In the winter, the Seuvarits and other Ute bands gathered around campfires and told stories. During this time, members of the tribe also repaired tools and created new clothes for the coming spring and summer. Additionally, around these campfires, chiefs announced major events such as the Bear Dance, a traditional dance that took place in the springtime meant to represent new life and rejuvenation. The Seuvarits people strived to live in harmony with their surroundings and the environment.

== History ==
=== Elk Mountain Mission ===
During the April 1855 General Conference of the Church of Jesus Christ of Latter-day Saints, about 40 men were called to carry out the Elk Mountain Mission to the area of present-day Moab, Utah. The mission was led by the Alfred N. Billings, who was appointed as the mission president by Latter-day Saint prophet Brigham Young. Billings appointed Oliver B. Huntington as mission clerk and Joseph Rawlins as wagon master and later first counselor to Billings. William R. Holden was appointed as second counselor. On June 10, 1855, the missionaries reached the valley of the Grand River and made first contact with the Seuvarits people there.

Initial relations with the Seuvarits people and their chief, St. John, were peaceful, and the missionaries felt a sense of security around the native people. Tensions began to grow as the missionaries began to construct a stone fort. The Seuvarits people began to steal from the missionaries. Complaints of the Seuvarits Utes arose that claimed the natives were collecting and hoarding supplies. By this time, animosity and tension had built up between the local Mormons and the Seuvarits. On September 3, 1855, a member of the Seuvarits band named Charles, the son of Chief St. John, shot one of the missionaries. In following weeks, the Seuvarits in Grass Valley raided settlements, killing Mormon settlers in the process. The Seuvarits, led by Charles, burned the missionaries' stockpiles of hay and corn and turned water away from their fort. In October of 1855, the missionaries made the decision to abandon the Elk Mountain Mission and return to northern Utah.

Though the Seuvarits people were described as being unmounted according to historical documents during the time of the Elk Mountain Mission in the 1850s, later reports in the 1860s later described the Seuvarits people as mounted and "well-armed."

=== Black Hawk War ===
Seuvarits Utes were involved in the 1865–1872 Black Hawk War (not to be confused with the 1832 Black Hawk War in Illinois and Wisconsin). They were considered to be a major force in Timpanogos Chief Antonga Black Hawk's bands of raiders. Their allies during the war included Timpanogos and San Pitch raiders, as well as members of the Yampa and White River bands. The relationship between Mormon settlers and Seuvarits Utes started peacefully, but tensions arose when Black Hawk lead both Seuvarits and San Pitch raiders in a bid to resist expanding Mormon settlements, which were encroaching on their western lands. The raiders targeted livestock, crops, and mills in an attempt to force settlers to flee from impoverishment. Oppositely, Paiute bands would often ally themselves with white settlers as they were considered to bring a reprieve from Ute dominion over the area.

=== Population decline ===
The Seuvarits people declined in population by the 1870s, as war and disease brought by Mormon missionaries greatly affected the band, which had not had much contact with white people in the past. Many Ute bands suffered from measles. The survivors joined with the Northern Ute groups of the Uncompahgre and the Weeminuche, as well as the Uintah Tribe. Remaining members of the Seuvarits band currently reside on the Uintah and Ouray Reservation in eastern Utah.

== Geography ==
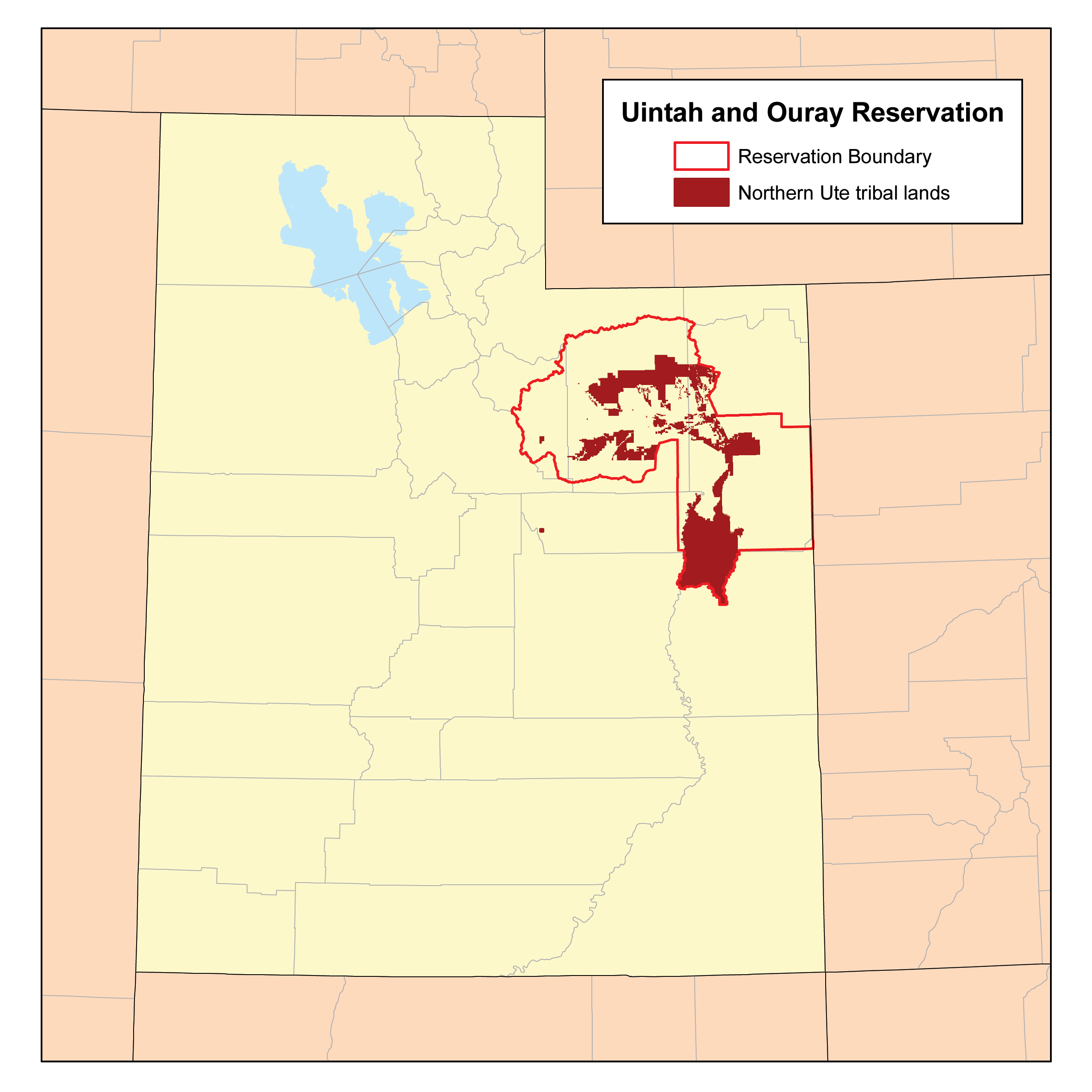
The Uintah and Ouray Indian Reservation, present home of the Seuvarits band of Utes.

=== Historic territories ===
The Seuvarits band of Utes traditionally inhabited the area of present-day Grand County in eastern Utah, east and west of the La Sal Mountains and along the Colorado River and the Green River. The Elk Mountain Mission was established in this area. The territories of the Seuvarits people also included the area of the Book Cliffs in western Colorado and eastern Utah, but the Seuvarits people tended to avoid these lands because of the lack of resources and the ruggedness of the terrain. Historically, the geography of their territories did not require the Seuvarits people to use horses, and they were described as unmounted, per reports as late as the 1850s, the time of the Elk Mountain Mission. After contact with white settlers from the time of the Elk Mountain Mission and beyond, the Seuvarits began to breed and make use of horses in their lifestyle.

=== Removal to reservations ===
Through United States federal intervention and involvement through the Bureau of Indian Affairs (an agency of the Department of the Interior), the remnants of the Seuvarits Ute band were relocated from their ancestral lands onto reservations. A number of members of the Seuvarits band refused to move. The main reservation that the Seuvarits were relocated to was the Uintah and Ouray Reservation located in the Uintah Basin. The Seuvarits were relocated there along with various other Ute bands and tribes such as the Timpanogos, Santaquin-Goshen, Moanunt, San Pitch, Koosharem, and Piede. Some individual bands of Ute Native Americans were destroyed by disease and war, and Ute populations shrank by as much as 20%. The tribes and bands relocated to the Uintah and Ouray Reservation were grouped into one band under federal direction known as the Uintah Utes. One of the effects of being relocated onto reservations included a loss of traditional tribal language and traditions as tribal elders passed away.

== Notable Seuvarits individuals ==
- Chief St. John, the Seuvarits chief during the time of the Elk Mountain Mission.
- Charles, son of St. John and key agitator in the conflict between the Seuvarits and Mormon settlers of the Elk Mountain Mission in 1855.
- Chu-ar Ru-um Peak, Seuvarits chief.
- U-Wa, wife of chief Chu-ar Ru-um Peak.
