= Ute people =

Indigenous people of the Great Basin in the United States

Utes
Núuchi
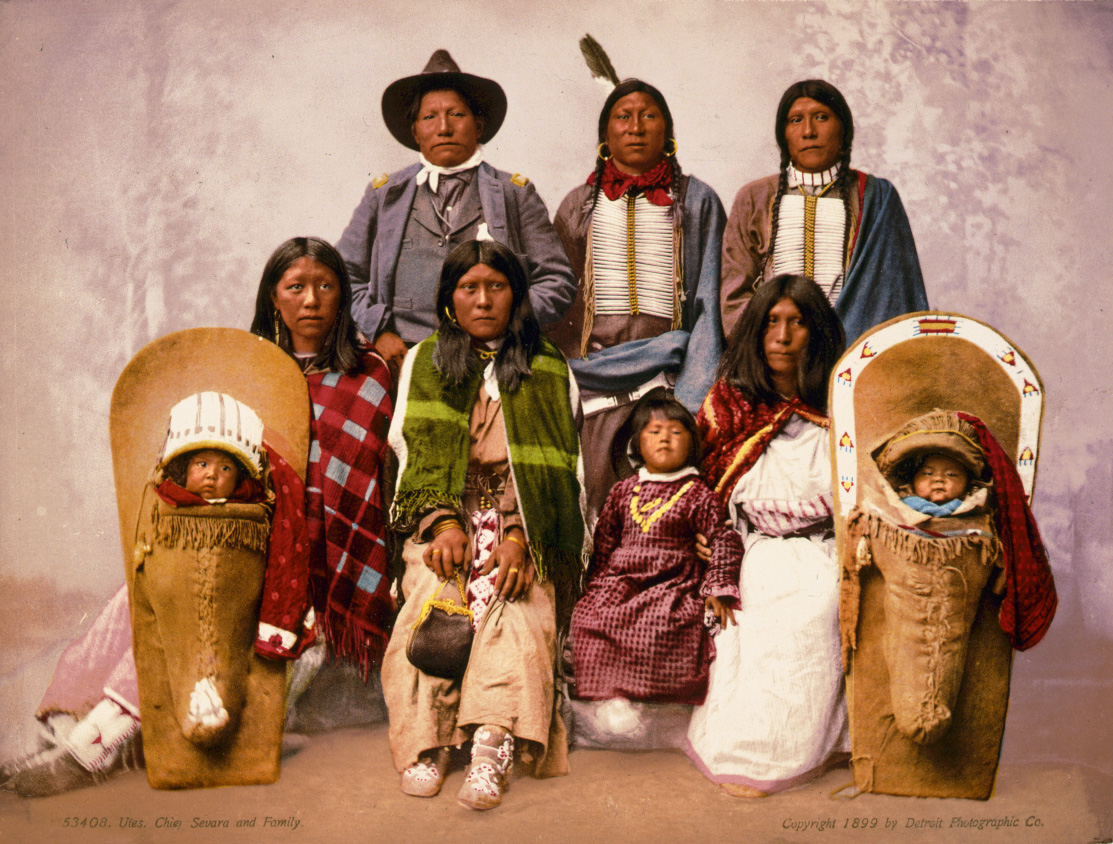
- Chief Severo and family, c. 1899

Total population
- 4,800–10,000

Regions with significant populations
- United States (Colorado, Utah)

Languages
- English, Spanish, Ute (Núuchi-u)

Religion
- Native American Church, Indigenous religion, and Christianity

Related ethnic groups
- Shoshone, Southern Paiute, and Chemehuevi

- People: Núuchi-u
- Language: Núu-'apaghapi; Wanawmanik
- Country: Núuchi Tuvupu

The Utes (/ˈjuːt/) are an Indigenous people of the Great Basin and Colorado Plateau in present-day Utah, western Colorado, and northern New Mexico. Historically, their territory also included parts of Wyoming, Nevada, and Arizona.

Their Ute dialect is a Colorado River Numic language, part of the Uto-Aztecan language family.

Historically, the Utes belonged to almost a dozen nomadic bands, who came together for ceremonies and trade. They also traded with neighboring tribes, including Pueblo peoples. The Utes had settled in the Four Corners region by 1500 CE.

The Utes' first contact with Europeans was with the Spanish in the 18th century. The Utes had already acquired horses from neighboring tribes by the late 17th century. They had limited direct contact with the Spanish but participated in regional trade.

Sustained contact with Euro-Americans began in 1847 with the arrival of the Mormons to the American West and the gold rushes of the 1850s. Utes fought to protect their homelands from invaders, and Brigham Young convinced U.S. President Abraham Lincoln to forcibly remove Utes in Utah to an Indian Reservation in 1864. Colorado Utes were forced onto a reservation in 1881.

Today, there are three federally recognized tribes of Ute people:

- Southern Ute Indian Tribe of the Southern Ute Reservation, Colorado
- Ute Indian Tribe of the Uintah and Ouray Reservation, Utah
- Ute Mountain Ute Tribe, Colorado

== Name ==
The origin of the word Ute is unknown; it is first attested as Yuta in Spanish documents. The Utes' self-designation is Núuchi-u, meaning 'the people'.

== Language ==
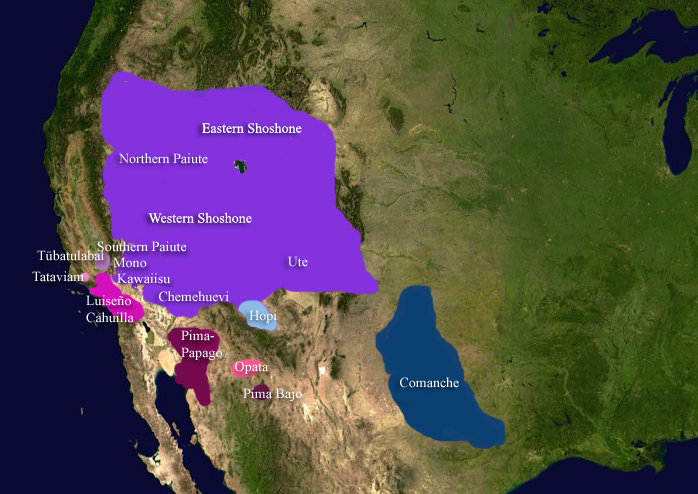
Distribution of Uto-Aztecan languages in present-day Western United States at the time of first European contact

Ute people speak the Ute dialect of the Colorado River Numic language, which is closely related to the Shoshone language.

Their language is from the Southern subdivision of the Numic language branch of the Uto-Aztecan language family. This language family is found almost entirely in the Western United States and Mexico, stretching from southeastern California, along the Colorado River to Colorado and extending south the Nahuan languages in central Mexico.

The Numic language group likely originated near the present-day border of Nevada and California, then spread north and east. By about 1000 CE, hunters and gatherers in the Great Basin spoke Uto-Aztecan. They are the likely ancestors of the Ute, Shoshone, Paiute, and Chemehuevi peoples. Linguists believe that the Southern Numic speakers (Ute and Southern Paiute), left the Numic homeland first and that the Central and then the Western subgroups later migrated east and north. The Southern Numic-speaking tribes, the Ute, Shoshone, Southern Paiute, and Chemehuevi, all share many cultural, genetic, and linguistic characteristics.

== Territory ==
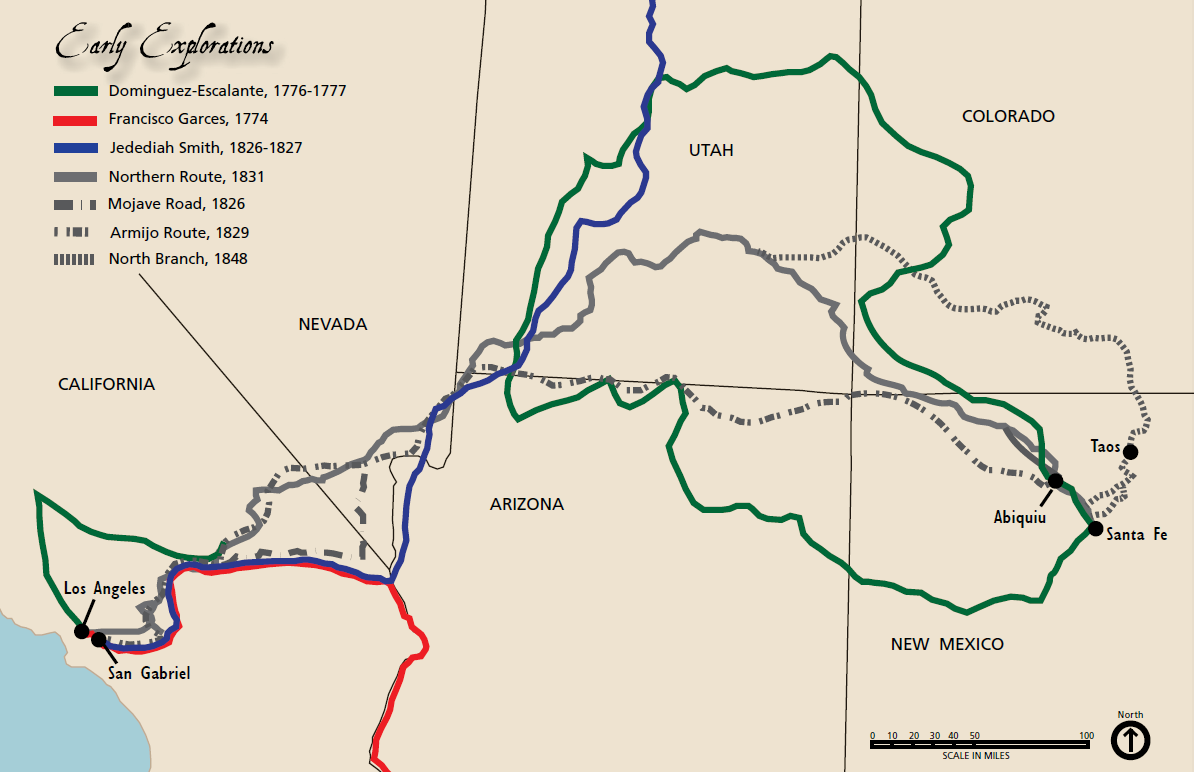
The Ute Trail, later called the Old Spanish Trail, was a trade route between Santa Fe and California, through Colorado and Utah. It was later used by European explorers of the west.

There were ancestral Utes in southwestern Colorado and southeastern Utah by 1300, living a hunter-gatherer lifestyle. The Utes occupied much of the present state of Colorado by the 1600s. The Comanches from the north joined them in eastern Colorado in the early 1700s. In the 19th century, the Arapaho and Cheyenne invaded southward into eastern Colorado.

The Utes came to inhabit a large area including most of Utah, western and central Colorado, and south into the San Juan River watershed of New Mexico. Some Ute bands stayed near their home domains, while others ranged further away seasonally. Hunting grounds extended further into Utah and Colorado, as well as into Wyoming, Oklahoma, Texas, and New Mexico. Winter camps were established along rivers near the present-day cities of Provo and Fort Duchesne in Utah and Pueblo, Fort Collins, Colorado Springs of Colorado.

=== Colorado ===
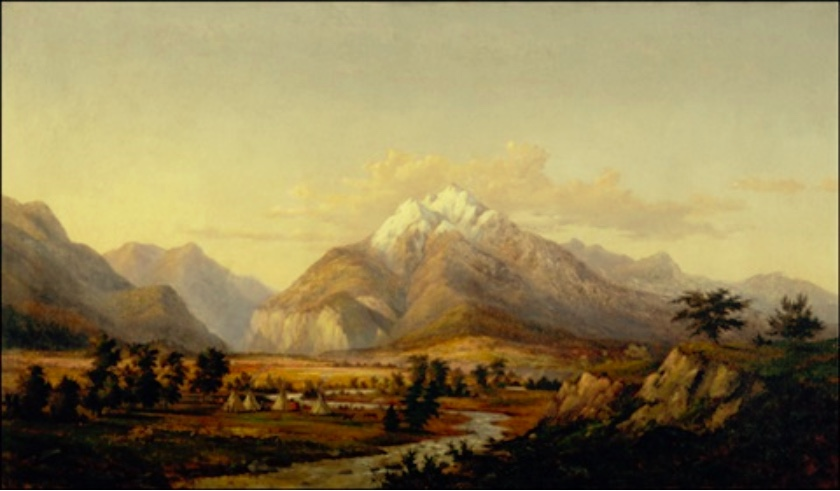
Henry Chapman Ford, Ute camp, by 1894

Aside from their home domain, there were sacred places in present-day Colorado. The Tabeguache Ute's name for Pikes Peak is Tavakiev, meaning sun mountain. Living a nomadic hunter-gatherer lifestyle, summers were spent in the Pikes Peak area mountains, which was considered by other tribes to be the domain of the Utes. Pikes Peak was a sacred ceremonial area for the band. The mineral springs at Manitou Springs were also sacred and Utes and other tribes came to the area, spent winters there, and "share[d] in the gifts of the waters without worry of conflict." Artifacts found from the nearby Garden of the Gods, such as grinding stones, "suggest the groups would gather together after their hunt to complete the tanning of hides and processing of meat."

The old Ute Pass Trail went eastward from Monument Creek (near Roswell) to Garden of the Gods and Manitou Springs to the Rocky Mountains. From Ute Pass, Utes journeyed eastward to hunt buffalo. They spent winters in mountain valleys where they were protected from the weather. The North and Middle Parks of present-day Colorado were among favored hunting grounds, due to the abundance of game.

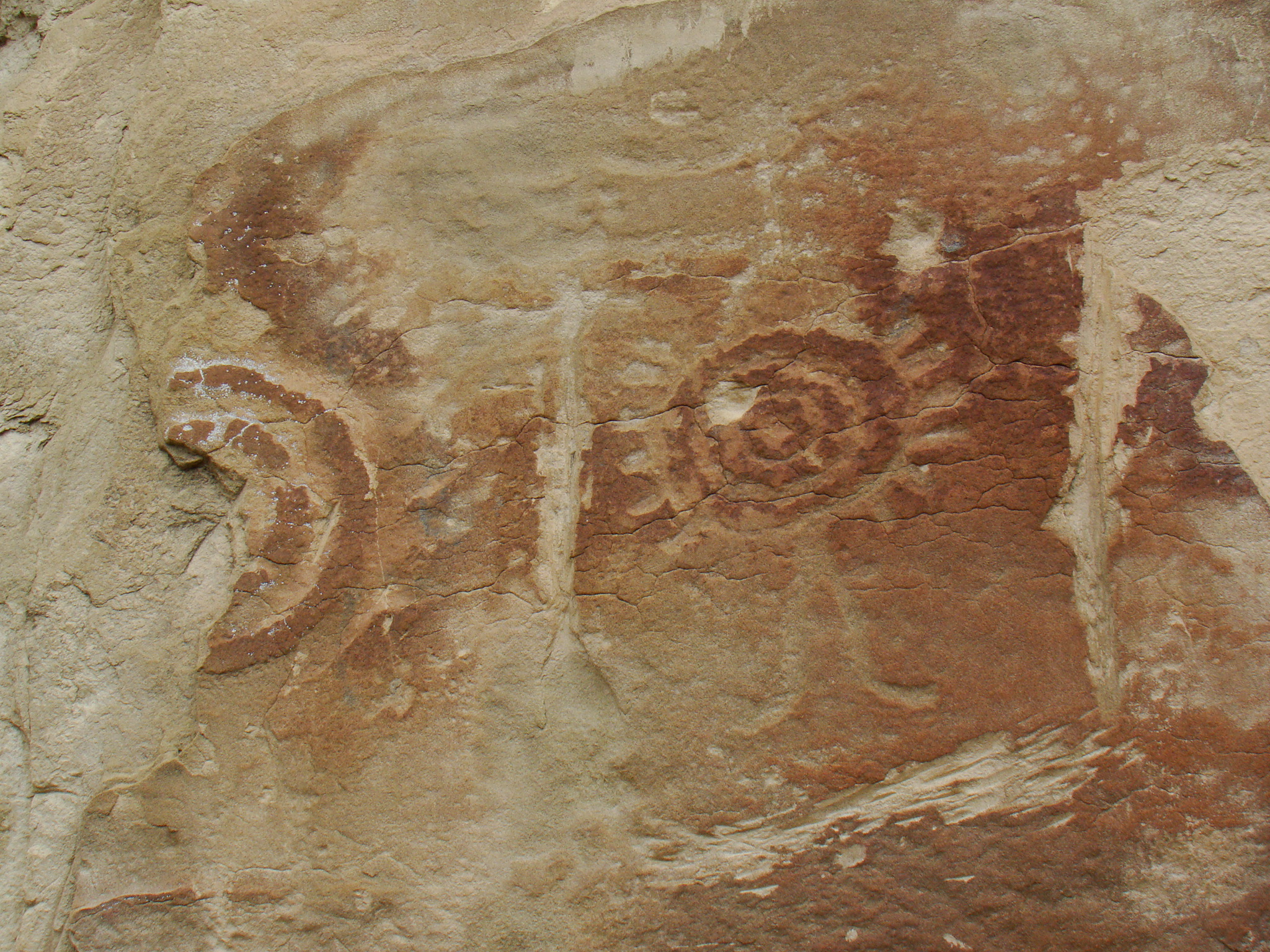
Cañon Pintado, south of Rangely in Rio Blanco County, Colorado

Cañon Pintado, or painted canyon, is a prehistoric site with rock art from Fremont people (650 to 1200) and Utes. The Fremont art reflect an interest in agriculture, including corn stalks and use of light at different times of the year to show a planting calendar. Then there are images of figures holding shields, what appear to be battle victims, and spears. These were seen by the Domínguez–Escalante expedition (1776). Utes left images of firearms and horses in the 1800s. The Crook's Brand Site depicts a horse with a brand from George Crook's regiment during the Indian Wars of the 1870s.

=== Utah ===
Public land surrounding the Bears Ears buttes in southeastern Utah became the Bears Ears National Monument in 2016 in recognition for its ancestral and cultural significance to several Native American tribes, including the Utes. Members of the Ute Mountain Ute and Uintah and Ouray Reservations sit on a five-tribe coalition to help co-manage the monument with the Bureau of Land Management and United States Forest Service.

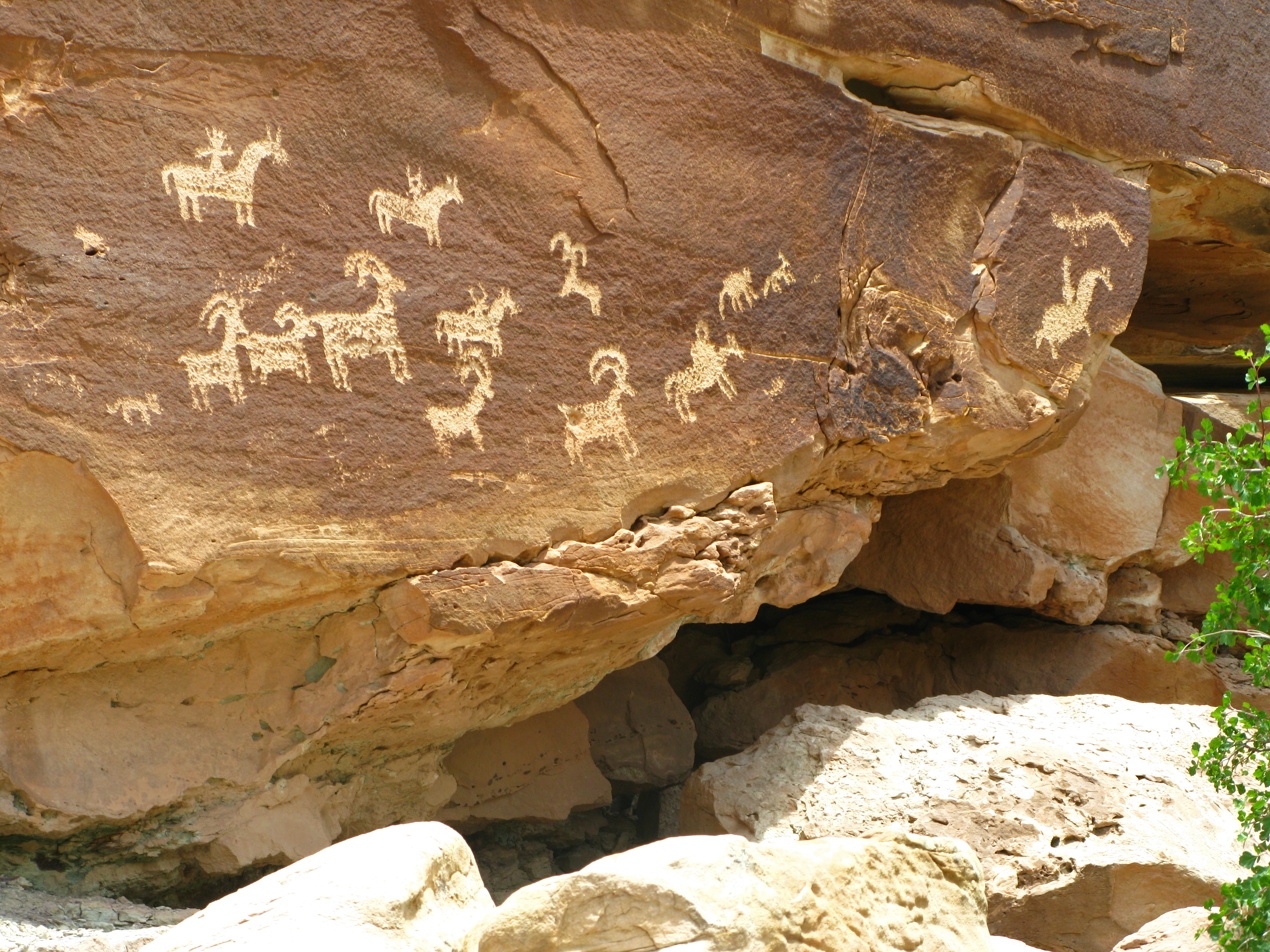
Ute petroglyphs at Arches National Park

The Ute appeared to have hunted and camped in an ancient Ancestral Puebloans and Fremont people campsite in near what is now Arches National Park. At a site near natural springs, which may have held spiritual significance, the Ute left petroglyphs in rock along with rock art by the earlier peoples. Some of the images are estimated to be more than 900 years old. The Utes petroglyphs were made after the Utes acquired horses, because they show men hunting while on horseback.

== Historic Ute bands ==
Distribution of Ute Indian bands: 1. Pahvant, 2. Moanunt, 3. Sanpits, 4. Timpanogots, 5. Uintah, 6. Seuvarits (Sheberetch), 7. Yampa, 8. Parianuche, 8a. Sabuagana, 9. Tabeguache, 10. Weeminuche, 11. Capote, 12. Muache. University Press of Colorado.

The Ute were divided into several nomadic and closely associated bands, which today mostly are organized as the Northern, Southern, and Ute Mountain Ute Tribes.

Hunting and gathering groups of extended families were led by older members by the mid-17th century. Activities, like hunting buffalo and trading, may have been organized by band members. Chiefs led bands when structure was required with the introduction of horses to plan for defense, buffalo hunting, and raiding. Bands came together for tribal activities by the 18th century.

Multiple bands of Utes that were classified as Uintahs by the U.S. government when they were relocated to the Ute Indian Tribe of the Uintah and Ouray Reservation. The bands included the San Pitch, Pahvant, Seuvartis, Timpanogos and Cumumba Utes. The Southern Ute Tribes include the Muache, Capote, and the Weeminuche, the latter of which are at Ute Mountain.

| # | Tribe | Ute Name | Home state | Home locale | Current name | Tribe Grouping | Reservation |
|---|---|---|---|---|---|---|---|
| 1 | Pahvant | | Utah | West of the Wasatch Range in the Pavant Range towards the Nevada border along the Sevier River in the desert around Sevier Lake and Fish Lake | Paiute | Northern | Paiute |
| 2 | Moanunt | | Utah | Upper Sevier River Valley in central Utah, in the Otter Creek region south of Salina and in the vicinity of Fish Lake | Paiute | Northern | Paiute |
| 3 | Sanpits | | Utah | Sanpete Valley and Sevier River Valley and along the San Pitch River | San Pitch | Northern | Uintah and Ouray |
| 4 | Timpanogots | Timpanogots Núuchi | Utah | Wasatch Range around Mount Timpanogos, along the southern and eastern shores of Utah Lake of the Utah Valley, and in Heber Valley, Uinta Basin and Sanpete Valley | Timpanogots | Northern | Uintah and Ouray |
| 5 | Uintah | Uintah Núuchi | Utah | Utah Lake to the Uintah Basin of the Tavaputs Plateau near the Grand-Colorado River-system | Uintah | Northern | Uintah and Ouray |
| 6 | Seuvarits (Sahyehpeech / Sheberetch) | Seuvarits Núuchi | Utah | Moab area | | Northern | Uintah and Ouray |
| 7 | Yampa | 'Iya-paa Núuchi | Colorado | Yampa River Valley area | White River Utes | Northern | Uintah and Ouray |
| 8 | Parianuche | Pariyʉ Núuchi | Colorado and Utah | Colorado River (previously called the Grand River) in western Colorado and eastern Utah | White River Ute | Northern | Uintah and Ouray |
| 8a | Sabuagana (Saguaguana / Akanaquint) | | Colorado | Colorado River in western and central Colorado | | Northern | |
| 9 | Tabeguache | Tavi'wachi Núuchi | Colorado and Utah | Gunnison and Uncompahgre River valleys | Uncompahgre | Northern | Uintah and Ouray |
| 10 | Weeminuche | Wʉgama Núuchi | Colorado and Utah | In the Abajo Mountains, in the Valley of the San Juan River and its northern tributaries and in the San Juan Mountains including eastern Utah. | Weeminuche | Ute Mountain | Ute Mountain |
| 11 | Capote | Kapuuta Núuchi | Colorado | East of the Great Divide, south of the Conejos River, and east of the Rio Grande towards the west site of the Sangre de Cristo Mountains, they were also living in the San Luis Valley, along the headwaters of the Rio Grande and along the Animas River | Capote | Southern | Southern |
| 12 | Muache | Moghwachi Núuchi | Colorado | Eastern foothills of the Rocky Mountains from Denver, Colorado in the north to Las Vegas, New Mexico in the south | Muache | Southern | Southern |

This is also a half-Shoshone, half-Ute band of Cumumbas who lived above Great Salt Lake, near what is now Ogden, Utah. There are also other half-Ute bands, some of whom migrated seasonally far from their home domain.

== History ==
=== Relationships with neighboring tribes ===
The Utes traded with Rio Grande River Pueblo people at annual trade fairs or rescates held in at the Taos, Santa Clara, Pecos and other pueblos. The Ute also traded with Navajo, Havasupai, and Hopi people for woven blankets.

The Utes were closely allied with the Jicarilla Apache who shared much of the same territory and intermarried. They also intermarried with Paiute, Bannock and Western Shoshone peoples. There was so much intermarriage with the Paiute, that territorial borders of the Utes and the Southern Paiutes are difficult to ascertain in southeast Utah. Until the Ute acquired horses, any conflict with other tribes was usually defensive. They had generally poor relations with Northern and Eastern Shoshone.

=== Contact with the Spanish ===
In 1637, the Spanish fought with the Utes, 80 of whom were captured and enslaved. Their lifestyle changed with the acquisition of horses at larger scale by 1680. They became more mobile, more able to trade, and better able to hunt large game. Ute culture changed dramatically in ways that paralleled the Plains Indian cultures of the Great Plains. They also became involved in the horse and slave trades and respected warriors. Horse ownership and warrior skills developed while riding became the primary status symbol within the tribe and horse racing became common. With greater mobility, there was increased need for political leadership.

The Utes had direct trade with the Spanish at least by 1765 and possibly earlier. The Utes had already acquired horses from neighboring tribes by the late 17th century.

During this time, few Europeans entered Ute territory. Exceptions to this include the Spanish Domínguez–Escalante expedition of 1776.

The Utes traded with other tribes who were part of the deerskin and fur trade with the Spanish in New Mexico in the 18th century. The Utes, the main trading partners of the Spanish residents of New Mexico, were known for their soft, high-quality tanned deerskins, or chamois, and they also traded meat, buffalo robes, and Indian and Spanish captives taken by the Comanche. The Utes traded their goods for cloth, blankets, guns, horses, maize, flour, and ornaments. Several Ute learned Spanish through trading. The Spanish "seriously guarded" trade with the Utes, limiting it to annual caravans, but by 1750 they were reliant on the trade with the Utes, their deerskin being a highly sought commodity. The Utes also traded in enslaved women and children captives from Apache, Comanche, Paiute and Navajo tribes.

French trappers passed through Ute territory and established trading posts beginning in the 1810s. The French expedition recorded meeting members of the Moanunts and Pahvant bands.

=== Horse culture ===
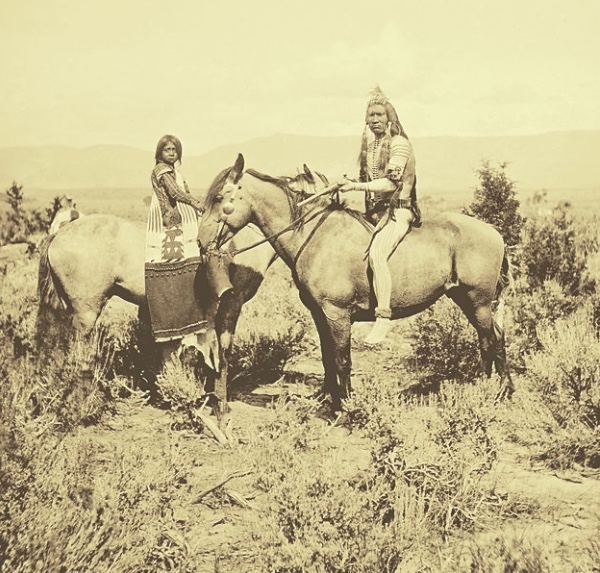
John Wesley Powell first became acquainted with the Utes along the White River in northwestern Colorado in the fall of 1868. During his expedition five years later, his photographer, Jack Hillers, captured this photograph of a young girl accompanied by a warrior, whose body, painted with yellow and black stripes, is marked for battle.

After the Utes acquired horses, they started to raid other Native American tribes. While their close relatives, the Comanches, moved out from the mountains and became Plains Indians as did others including the Cheyenne, Arapaho, Kiowa, and Plains Apache, the Utes remained close to their ancestral homeland. The south and eastern Utes also raided Native Americans in New Mexico, Southern Paiutes and Western Shoshones, capturing women and children and selling them as slaves in exchange for Spanish goods. They fought with Plains Indians, including the Comanche, who had previously been allies. The name "Comanche" is from the Ute word for them, kɨmantsi, meaning enemy. The Pawnee, Osage and Navajo also became enemies of the Plains Indians by about 1840. Some Ute bands fought against the Spanish and Pueblos with the Jicarilla Apache and the Comanche. The Ute were sometimes friendly but sometimes hostile to the Navajo.

The Utes were skilled warriors who specialized in horse mounted combat. War with neighboring tribes was mostly fought for gaining prestige, stealing horses, and revenge. Men would organize themselves into war parties made up of warriors, medicine men, and a war chief who led the party. To prepare themselves for battle Ute warriors would often fast, participate in sweat lodge ceremonies, and paint their faces and horses for special symbolic meanings. The Utes were master horsemen and could execute daring maneuvers on horseback while in battle. Most plains Indians had warrior societies, but the Ute generally did not – the Southern Utes developed such societies late, and soon lost them in reservation life. Warriors were exclusively men but women often followed behind war parties to help gather loot and sing songs. Women also performed the Lame Dance to symbolize having to pull or carry heavy loads of loot after a raid. The Utes used a variety of weapons including bows, spears and buffalo-skin shields, as well as rifles, shotguns and pistols which were obtained through raiding or trading.

=== Contact with other European settlers ===
The Ute people traded with Europeans by the early 19th century including at encampments in the San Luis Valley, Wet Mountains, and the Upper Arkansas Valley and at the annual Rocky Mountain Rendezvous. Native Americans also traded at annual trade fairs in New Mexico, which were also ceremonial and social events lasting up to ten days or more. They involved the trading of skins, furs, foods, pottery, horses, clothing, and blankets.

In Utah, Utes began to be impacted by European-American contact with the 1847 arrival of Mormon settlers. After initial settlement by the Mormons, as they moved south to the Wasatch Front, Utes were pushed off their land.

Wars with settlers began about the 1850s when Ute children were captured in New Mexico and Utah by Anglo-American traders and sold in New Mexico and California. The rush of Euro-American settlers and prospectors into Ute country began with an 1858 gold strike. The Ute allied with the United States and Mexico in its war with the Navajo during the same period.

Mormons continued to push the Utah Utes off their homelands, which escalated into the Walker War (1853–54). By the mid-1870s, the U.S. federal government forced Utes in Utah onto a reservation, less than 9% of their former land. The Utes found it to be very inhospitable and tried to continue hunting and gathering off the reservation. In the meantime, the Black Hawk War (1865–72) occurred in Utah.

In 1868, the U.S. federal government established reservation in Colorado. Indian agents tried to get the Utes to farm, a dramatic lifestyle change which lead to starvation due to crop failures. Their lands were whittled away until only the modern reservations were left. A large cession of land in 1873 transferred the gold-rich San Juan area, which was followed in 1879 by the loss of most of the remaining land after the "Meeker Massacre". Utes were later put on a reservation in Utah, Uintah and Ouray Indian Reservation, as well as two reservations in Colorado, Ute Mountain Ute Tribe and Southern Ute Indian Reservation.

== Treaties with the United States ==
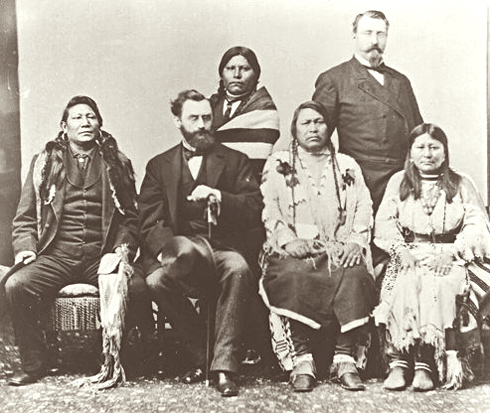
Delegation of Ute Indians in Washington, D.C., in 1880. Background: Woretsiz and general Charles Adams (Colorado Indian agent) are standing. Front from left to right: Chief Ignacio of the Southern Utes; Carl Schurz US Secretary of the Interior; Chief Ouray and his wife Chipeta.

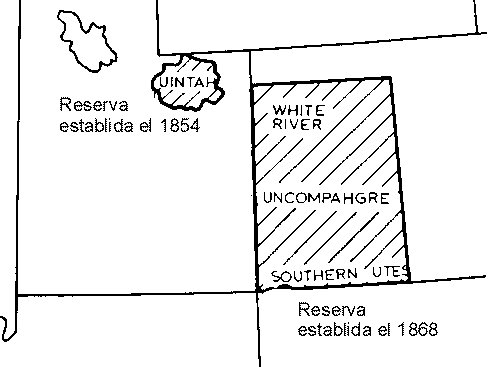
Territory from Treaty of 1868, relinquishing land east of the Continental Divide, including Pikes Peak and San Luis Valley sacred and hunting grounds

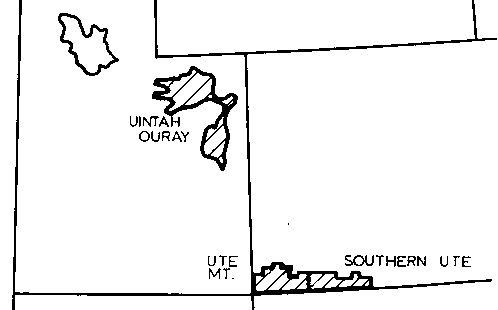
Map of present-day reservations

Following acquisition of Ute territory from Mexico by the Treaty of Guadalupe-Hidalgo 1848, the United States made a series of treaties with the Ute and executive orders that ultimately culminated with relocation to reservations:

- On December 30, 1849, Quixiachigiate and 27 other chiefs of the Capote and Mouache Utes and signed the Peace Treaty of Abiquiú at Abiquiú (New Mexico) with new U.S. Indian Commissioner James S. Calhoun.
- On October 3, 1861, U.S. President Abraham Lincoln signed an executive order reserving the Uinta River Valley in the Territory of Utah for American Indians.
- On October 7, 1863, leaders of the Tabeguache Utes signed the Tabeguache Treaty at the Tabaquache Agency at Conejos in San Luis Valley. The Tabeguache relinquished all land east of the Continental Divide and Middle Park. Unfortunately, this included land occupied by the Capote Utes.
- On May 5, 1864, President Lincoln signed "An Act to vacate and sell the present Indian Reservations in Utah Territory, and to settle the Indians of said Territory in the Uinta Valley", unilaterally removing all Indians in the Territory of Utah to the Uinta Valley Reservation. On February 23, 1865, President Lincoln signed "An Act to extinguish the Indian Title to Lands in the Territory of Utah suitable for agricultural and mineral Purposes", expropriating Indian lands in the Territory of Utah outside of the Uinta Valley Reservation.
- On March 2, 1868, leaders of the seven bands of the Ute Nation signed the Ute Treaty of 1868 in Washington, D.C. The Utes were removed to the Consolidated Ute Reservation in the western portion of the Territory of Colorado and the Uinta Valley Reservation in the Territory of Utah.
- On September 13, 1873, leaders of the seven bands of the Ute Nation signed the Brunot Treaty in Washington, D.C. The Utes relinquished land in the San Juan Mountains desired by miners.
- On November 9, 1878, leaders of the Capote, Mouache, and Weeminuche Utes signed an agreement at Pagosa Springs, Colorado, establishing the Southern Ute Indian Reservation and relinquishing all other land in Colorado.
- On March 6, 1880, leaders of the seven bands of the Ute Nation signed the Ute Agreement of 1880 at Washington, D.C. The Agreement called for the Tabeguache Utes to remove to the Grand Valley of Colorado and Parianuche and Yamparica Utes to remove to the Uintah Reservation in the Territory of Utah.
- On January 5, 1882, President Chester A. Arthur signed an executive order to remove the Tabeguache Utes to the new Uncompahgre Indian Reservation in the Territory of Utah.
- On July 28, 1882, President Arthur signed An act relating to lands in Colorado lately occupied by the Uncompahgre and White River Ute Indians, expropriating the lands of the Parianuche, Tabeguache, and Yamparica Utes in Colorado.
- On June 6, 1940, the Weeminuche Utes separated from the Southern Ute Indian Reservation as the Ute Mountain Tribe of the Ute Mountain Reservation.

== Reservations ==
=== Uinta and Ouray Indian Reservation ===
The Uinta and Ouray Indian Reservation is the second-largest Indian Reservation in the US – covering over 4,500,000 acres (18,000 km^{2}) of land. Tribal owned lands only cover approximately 1.2 million acres (4,855 km^{2}) of surface land and 40,000 acres (160 km^{2}) of mineral-owned land within the 4 million acres (16,185 km^{2}) reservation area. Founded in 1861, it is located in Carbon, Duchesne, Grand, Uintah, Utah, and Wasatch Counties in Utah. Raising stock and oil and gas leases are important revenue streams for the reservation. The tribe is a member of the Council of Energy Resource Tribes.

==== Northern Ute Tribe ====
The Ute Indian Tribe of the Uintah and Ouray Reservation (Northern Ute Tribe) consists of the following groups of people:

- Uintah tribe, which is larger than its historical band since the U.S. government classified the following bands as Uintah when they were relocated to the reservation: Sanpits (San Pitch), Pahvant that were not assimilated into the Paiute, Timpanogos, and Seuvarits.
- White River Utes consists of Yampa and Parianuche Utes.
- Uncompahgre, formerly called the Tabeguache Utes.

=== Southern Ute Indian Reservation ===
The Southern Ute Indian Reservation is located in southwestern Colorado, with its capital at Ignacio. The area around the Southern Ute Indian reservation are the hills of Bayfield and Ignacio, Colorado.

The Southern Utes are the wealthiest of the tribes. The Tribe holds a triple A credit rating with all three primary rating agencies. Oil & gas, and real estate leases, plus various off-reservation financial and business investments, have contributed to their success. The tribe owns the Red Cedar Gathering Company, which owns and operates natural gas pipelines in and near the reservation. The tribe also owns the Red Willow Production Company, which began as a natural gas production company on the reservation. It has expanded to explore for and produce oil and natural gas in Colorado, New Mexico, Texas and in the deep water in the Gulf of Mexico. Red Willow has offices in Ignacio, Colorado, and Houston, Texas. The Sky Ute Casino and its associated entertainment and tourist facilities, together with tribally operated Lake Capote, draw tourists. It hosts the Four Corners Motorcycle Rally each year. The Ute operate KSUT, the major public radio station serving southwestern Colorado and the Four Corners.

==== Southern Ute Tribe ====
The Southern Ute Tribes include the Muache, Capote, and the Weeminuche, the latter of which are at Ute Mountain.

=== Ute Mountain Reservation ===
The Ute Mountain Reservation is located near Towaoc, Colorado, in the Four Corners region. Twelve ranches are held by tribal land trusts rather than family allotments. The tribe holds fee patent on 40,922.24 acres in Utah and Colorado. The 553,008-acre reservation borders the Mesa Verde National Park, Navajo Reservation, and the Southern Ute Reservation. The Ute Mountain Tribal Park abuts Mesa Verde National Park and includes many Ancestral Puebloan ruins. Their land includes the sacred Ute Mountain. The White Mesa Community of Utah (near Blanding) is part of the Ute Mountain Ute Tribe but is largely autonomous.

The Ute Mountain Utes are descendants of the Weeminuche band, who moved to the western end of the Southern Ute Reservation in 1897. (They were led by Chief Ignacio, for whom the eastern capital is named).

=== Cultural and lifestyle changes on the reservations ===
Prior to living on reservations, Utes shared land with other tribal members according to a traditional societal property system. Instead of recognizing this lifestyle, the U.S. government provided allotments of land, which was larger for families than for single men. The Utes were intended to farm the land, which also was a forced vocational change. Some tribes, like the Uintah and Uncompahgre were given arable land, while others were allocated land that was not suited to farming and they resisted being forced to farm. The White River Utes were the most resentful and protested in Washington, D.C. The Weeminuches successfully implemented a shared property system from their allotted land. Utes were forced to perform manual labor, relinquish their horses, and send their children to American Indian boarding schools. Almost half of the children sent to boarding school in Albuquerque died in the mid-1880s, due to tuberculosis or other diseases.

There was a dramatic reduction in the Ute population, partly attributed to Utes moving off the reservation or resisting being counted. In the early 19th century, there were about 8,000 Utes, and there were only about 1,800 tribe members in 1920. Although there was a significant reduction in the number of Utes after they were relocated to reservations, in the mid-20th century the population began to increase. This is partly because many people have returned to reservations, including those who left to attain college educations and careers. By 1990, there were about 7,800 Utes, with 2,800 living in cities and towns and 5,000 on reservations.

Utes have self-governed since the Indian Reorganization Act of 1934. Elections are held to select tribal council members. The Northern, Southern, and Ute Mountain Utes received a total of $31 million in a land claims settlement. The Ute Mountain Tribe used their money, including what they earned from mineral leases, to invest in tourist related and other enterprises in the 1950s.

Under the 1954 Ute Partition and Termination Act, members of the Ute Indian Tribe classified as "mixed-blood" were separated from the federally recognized tribal structure. Following termination, they organized as the Affiliated Ute Citizens, a group formed to represent their collective interests despite the loss of federal recognition. As a result of termination, they were removed from federal trust responsibilities, lost access to tribal lands and federal benefits, and were no longer officially recognized as tribal members. This imposed separation caused lasting economic and cultural disruption, contributing to long-term hardship and intensifying pressures toward assimilation.

Since the Indian Self-Determination and Education Assistance Act of 1975, the Utes control the police, courts, credit management, and schools.

== Modern life ==
All Ute reservations are involved in oil and gas leases and are members of the Council of Energy Resource Tribes. The Southern Ute Tribe is financially successful, having a casino for revenue generation. The Ute Mountain Ute Tribe generates revenues through gas and oil, mineral sales, casinos, stock raising, and a pottery industry. The tribes make some money on tourism and timber sales. Artistic endeavors include basketry and beadwork. The annual household income is well below that of their non-Native neighbors. Unemployment is high on the reservation, in large part due to discrimination, and half of the tribal members work for the government of the United States or the tribe.

The Ute language is still spoken on the reservation. Housing is generally adequate and modern. There are annual performances of the Bear and Sun dances. All tribes have scholarship programs for college educations. Alcoholism is a significant problem at Ute Mountain, affecting nearly 80% of the population. The age expectancy there was 40 years of age as of 2000.

== Culture ==
The culture of the Utes was influenced by the invasion of neighboring Native American tribes. The eastern Utes had many traits of Plains Indians, and they lived in tepees after the 17th century. The western Utes were similar to Shoshones and Paiutes, and they lived year-round in domed willow houses. Weeminuches lived in willow houses during the summer. The Jicarilla Apache and Puebloans influenced the southeastern Utes. All groups also lived in structures 10–15 feet in diameter that were made of conical pole-frames and brush, and sweat lodges were similarly built. Lodging also included hide tepees and ramadas, depending upon the area.

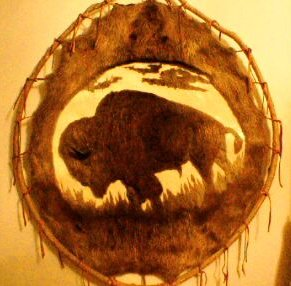
An Uncompahgre Ute shaved beaver hide painting, made by trapping beavers and shaving images into the stretched and cured hides. They have used these paintings to decorate their personal and ceremonial dwellings.

People lived in extended family groups of about 20 to 100 people. They traveled to seasonally-specific camps. In the spring and summer, family groups hunted and gathered food. The men hunted buffalo, antelope, elk, deer, bear, rabbit, sage hens, and beaver using arrows, spears and nets. They smoked and sun-dried the meat, and also ate it fresh. They also fished in fresh water sources, like Utah Lake. Women processed and stored the meat and gathered greens, berries, roots, yampa, pine nuts, yucca, and seeds. The Pahvant were the only Utes to cultivate food. Some western groups ate reptiles and lizards. Some southeastern groups planted corn and some encouraged the growth of wild tobacco. Implements were made of wood, stone, and bone. Skin bags and baskets were used to carry goods. There is evidence that pottery was made by the Utes as early as the 16th century.

Men and women wore woven and leather clothing and rabbit skin robes. They wore their hair long or in braids. Parents provided some input, but people decided who they would take as spouses. Men could have multiple wives, and divorce was common and easy. There were restrictions for menstruating women and couples who were pregnant. Children were encouraged to be industrious through several rituals. When someone died, that person was buried in their best clothes with their head facing east. Their possessions were generally destroyed, and their horses either had their hair cut or they were killed.

Occasionally members of Ute bands met up to trade, intermarry, and practice ceremonies, like the annual spring Bear Dance.

=== Spirituality and religion ===
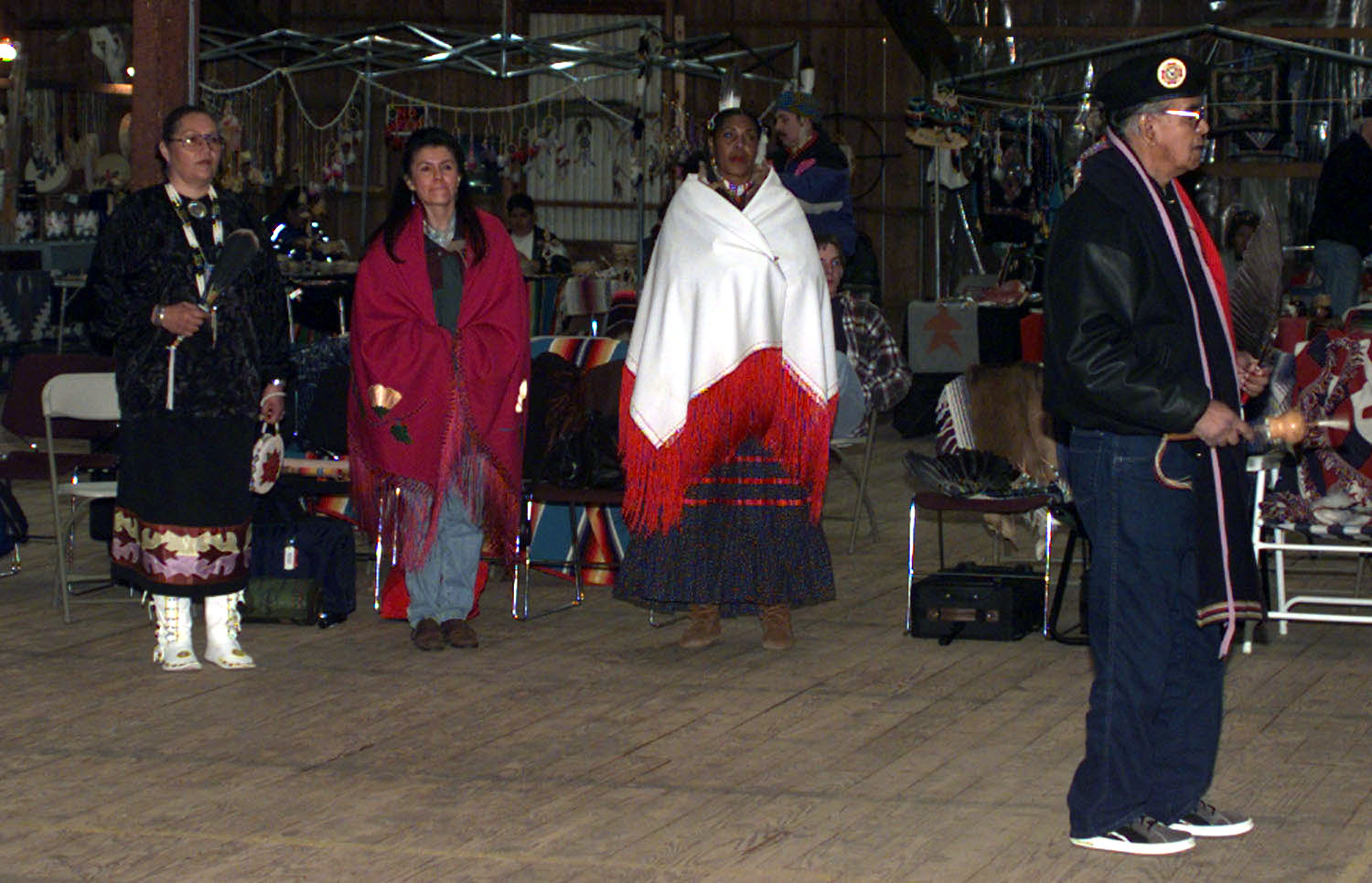
A Northern Ute dancer performs the Gourd Dance. The Gourd dance originates from the Kiowa Tribe of Oklahoma.

Utes have believed that all living things possess supernatural power. A medicine person, of any gender, receives power from dreams and some take vision quests. Traditionally, Utes relied on medicine men for their physical and spiritual health, but it has become a dying occupation. Spiritual leaders have emerged that perform ceremonies previously performed by medicine men, like sweat ceremonies, one of the oldest spiritual ceremonies of the Utes, performed in a sweat lodge. The annual fasting and purification ceremony Sun Dance is an important traditional spiritual event, feast, and means of asserting their Native American identity. It is held mid-summer. Each spring the Ute (Northern and Southern) hold their traditional Bear Dance, which was used to strengthen social ties and for courtship. It is one of the oldest Ute ceremonies.

The Native American Church is another source of spiritual life for some Ute, where followers believe that "God reveals Himself in Peyote." The church integrates Native American rituals with Christianity beliefs. One of the followers was Sapiah ("Buckskin Charley"), chief of the Southern Ute Tribe.

Christianity was picked up by some Ute from missionaries of the Presbyterian and Catholic churches. Some Northern Utes accepted Mormonism. It is common for people to see Christianity and Native American spirituality as complementary beliefs, rather than believing that they have to pick either Christianity or Native American spirituality.

==== Ceremonial items and artwork ====
Utes produced beadwork over centuries. They obtained glass beads and other trade items from early trading contact with Europeans and rapidly incorporated their use into their objects.

Native Americans have been using ceremonial pipes for thousands and years, and the traditional pipes have been used in sacred Ute ceremonies that are conducted by a medicine person or spiritual leader. The pipe symbolizes the Ute's connection to the creator and their existence on Earth. They conduct pipe ceremonies during events were different people come together. For instance, they conducted a pipe ceremony at an Interfaith event in Salt Lake City, Utah.

A Northern Ute ceremonial knife made from white quartz and Western cedar wood. These knives were used to cut the umbilical cord of a newborn infant or to harvest sweetgrass and other sacred herbs for ceremonies.

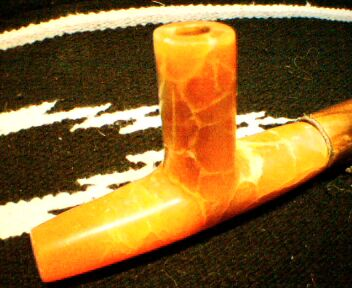
Uncompahgre Ute Salmon Alabaster Ceremonial Pipe. Ute pipe styles are similar to those of the Plains Indians, with notable differences. Ute pipes are thicker and use shorter pipestems than the Plains style, and more closely resemble the pipe styles of their Northern neighbors, the Shoshone.

=== Ethnobotany ===
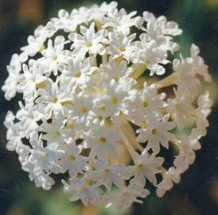
Abronia fragrans

Medicine women used up to 300 plants to treat ailments. Pine pitch or split cactus was used to treat sores or wounds. Sage leaves were used for colds. Sage tea and powdered obsidian for sore eyes. Teas were made from various plants to treat stomachaches. Grass was used to stop bleeding. The Ute use the roots and flowers of Abronia fragrans for stomach and bowel troubles. Cedar and sage were used in purification ceremonies conducted in sweat lodges. Yarrow was also used as a medicine by the Utes. There were many plants found in Provo Canyon that were used by Utes as medicine.

== Population history ==
The Ute were estimated at 6,000 in New Mexico in year 1846 (and also 6,000 in 1854), 7,000 in Colorado in year 1866 and 13,050 in Utah in 1867, for a total of around 26,050 in the mid-19th century. In 1868 it was reported that 5,000 Ute lived on the Colorado reservation. Later Ute population declined rapidly. The census of 1890 counted only 2,839 (1,854 in Utah and 985 in Colorado), Indian Affairs 1900 reported 2,694 (1,699 in Utah and 995 in Colorado) and in 1910 there were about 2,658 (1,472 in Utah, 815 in Colorado and 371 in South Dakota).

Ute population has increased in the 20th and 21st centuries, and 15,119 people identified as Ute on the 2020 census.

== Notable historic Utes ==
- Black Hawk, son of Chief San-Pitch and noted War leader during the Utah Black Hawk War (1865–72).
- Chipeta, Ouray's wife and Ute delegate to negotiations with federal government
- R. Carlos Nakai, Native American flutist
- Ouray, leader of the Uncompahgre band of the Ute tribe
- Polk, Ute-Paiute chief
- Posey, Ute-Paiute chief
- Joseph Rael, (b. 1935), dancer, author, and spiritualist
- Sanpitch, chief of the Sanpete tribe, and brother of Chief Walkara. Sanpete County is named for him.
- Raoul Trujillo, dancer, choreographer, and actor
- Chief Walkara, also called Chief Walker, the most prominent Chief in the Utah area when the Mormon Pioneers arrived and leader during the Walker War.

== See also ==
- Otto Mears
- Pinhook Draw fight
- Ute Indian Museum
- Ute music
- Ute mythology
