= Sanpitch =

Sanpitch may refer to:

== Places ==
- San Pitch River, a river in Sanpete County, Utah
- Sanpete County, Utah, US
  - Sanpete Valley or Valley of the Sanpitch or Sanpitch Valley, Utah, US
- San Pitch Mountains, a mountain range that runs along the west side of Sanpete County, Utah, US

== People ==
- San Pitch Utes, an American Indian tribe who lived in the Sanpete Valley
- Sanpitch (Ute chief) (killed 1866), chief of the Sanpits tribe who lived in the Sanpete Valley, Utah, US
- Sanpitch (Shoshone chief) (alive in 1870), associated with the Bear River Massacre, Idaho, US

== See also ==
- Sampit, a town on the Sampit River, Borneo, Indonesia
