= Tamra (disambiguation) =

Tamra is an Arab city in the Lower Galilee in Israel.

Tamra may also refer to:

- Tamra, Jezreel Valley, an Arab village in the Jezreel Valley in Israel
- Tamra, the Island, a 2009 South Korean television series
- Technical and Miscellaneous Revenue Act of 1988, an act of the U.S. Congress related to Social Security
- Carboxytetramethylrhodamine (TAMRA), a derivative of the dye rhodamine

Tamra is also an alternative spelling of the female given name Tamara. People with this given name include:

- Tamra Davis (born 1962), American film and television director
- Tamra Mercieca (born 1980), Australian author
- Tamra Borchardt-Slayton (born 1987), chairperson and leader of the Paiute Indian Tribe of Utah
- Tamra Keenan (fl. 2001–present), Irish singer-songwriter
- Tamra Judge (born 1967), American television personality, cast member of The Real Housewives of Orange County

== See also ==
- Tamna, an ancient kingdom located on modern day Jeju Island, South Korea
