= Cumumba =

Native American tribe

Cumumba (also called Weber Utes and Cumumba Utes) is a Native American tribe of mixed Shoshone and Ute heritage who lived above Great Salt Lake, near what is now Ogden, Utah. Cumumbas were classified as members of the Uintah tribe by the U.S. government when they were relocated to the Uintah and Ouray Indian Reservation.
