= Milburn, Utah =

Unincorporated community in the state of Utah, United States

Milburn
- Unincorporated community
- Location within the state of Utah
- Coordinates: 39°42′15″N 111°25′30″W
- Country: United States
- State: Utah
- County: Sanpete
- Named for: Sawmills
- Elevation: 6,365 ft (1,940 m)
- Time zone: UTC-7 (Mountain (MST))
  - Summer (DST): UTC-6 (MDT)
- ZIP code: 84629
- Area code: 435
- GNIS feature ID: 1443385

Milburn is an unincorporated community in Sanpete County, Utah, United States.

== Description ==
Historical population
Census	Pop.	Note	%±
1900	213		—
1910	103		−51.6%
1920	146		41.7%
1930	137		−6.2%
1940	101		−26.3%
1950	57		−43.6%
Source: U.S. Census Bureau

The settlement is mainly an outgrowth of Fairview on the San Pitch River. Milburn has had several names in the past such as Milborn and Millburn, all of which were related in some way to the early sawmills built at the mouth of nearby canyons. Today, Milburn is mostly an agricultural region.
