= Uncompahgre Ute =

Native American tribe located in Colorado and Utah

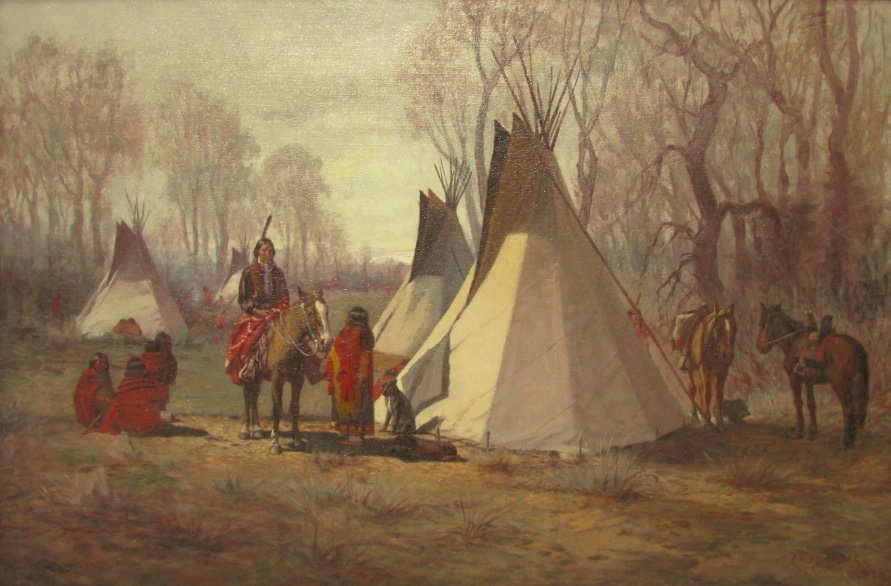
Charles Craig, Uncompahgre Ute Indian Camp, 1893, Denver Art Museum

The Uncompahgre Ute (/ˌʌŋkəmˈpɑːɡreɪ ˈjuːt/) or ꞌAkaꞌ-páa-gharʉrʉ Núuchi (also: Ahkawa Pahgaha Nooch) is a band of the Ute, a Native American tribe located in the US states of Colorado and Utah. In the Ute language, uncompahgre means "rocks that make water red." The band was formerly called the Tabeguache.

== Tabeguache ==
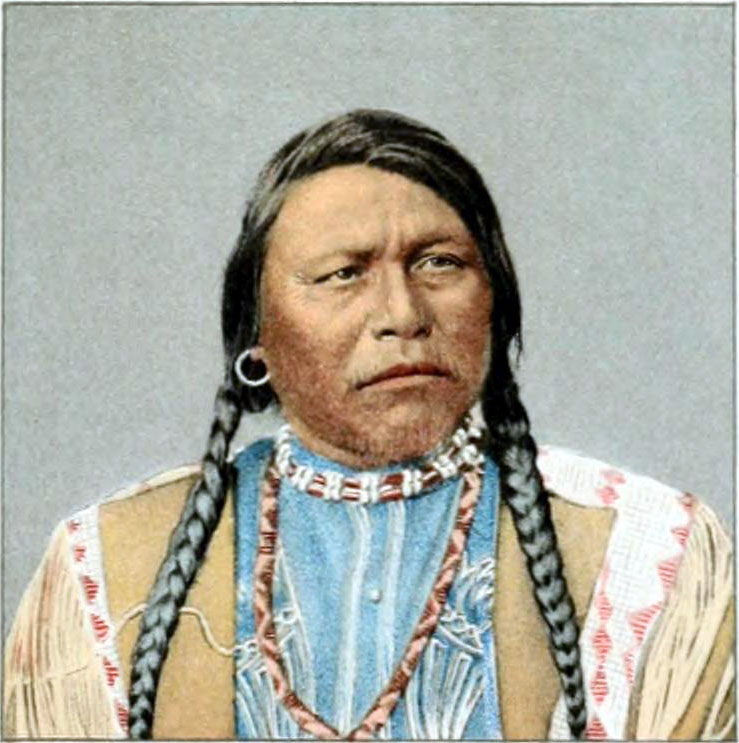
Chief Ouray

The Tabeguache (Ute language: Tavi'wachi Núuchi, Taveewach,Taviwach, and Taviwac), or “People of Sun Mountain,” was the largest of the ten nomadic bands of the Ute and part of the Northern Ute People. They lived in river valleys of the Gunnison River and Uncompahgre River between the Parianuche to the north and the Weeminuche to the south. They traveled seasonally. Like other Ute, they were hunters who followed and hunted buffalo, deer, and elk. They moved their camp about every month, and created a link to Mother Earth at each camp by constructing a medicine wheel at the center of camp.

The Tabeguache believed that the Pikes Peak region is their home. Their name for the mountain is Tavakiev, meaning "sun mountain." Living a nomadic hunter-gatherer lifestyle, summers were spent in the Pikes Peak area mountains, which was considered by other tribes to be the domain of the Utes. Pikes Peak was a sacred ceremonial area for the Tabeguache Utes, including their Sundance grounds and culturally scarred Ponderosa Pines that were used for different purposes, including prayer, burial, peeled-bark medicine, and arborglyphs or message trees. Some of the trees are 800 years old. An endowment was established by the Pikes Peak Historical Society in 2001 to help members of the Ute Nation to return to their homelands around Pikes Peak.

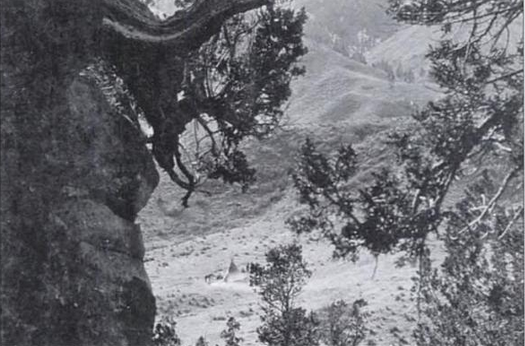
Valley of springs in present-day Manitou Springs, where Ute came to hunt and take the mineral springs. The center of the photograph shows a "lone encampment" of Ute Native Americans, between 1874 and 1879.

In the fall they would travel Ute Pass and visit the springs where they "made offerings to the spirits of the springs for good health and good hunting". There were about ten mineral springs, called manitou for the "breath of the Great Spirit Manitou" believed to have created the bubbles, or "effervescence", in the spring water. The springs were considered sacred grounds where Native Americans drank and soaked in the mineral water to replenish and heal themselves. Ute and other tribes came to the area, spent winters there, and "share[d] in the gifts of the waters without worry of conflict." Artifacts found from the nearby Garden of the Gods, such as grinding stones, "suggest the groups would gather together after their hunt to complete the tanning of hides and processing of meat."

The old Ute Passmotion Trail went westward from Monument Creek (near Roswell) to Garden of the Gods and Manitou Springs to the Rocky Mountains. From Ute Pass, Utes journeyed eastward to hunt buffalo. They spent winters in mountain valleys where they were protected from the weather. The North and Middle Parks of present-day Colorado were among favored hunting grounds, due to the abundance of game.

John Wesley Powell lived with the Northern Ute People in 1868–69 and he observed:

"[the Ute] will never ask to what nation or tribe or body of people another Indian belongs but to ‘what land do you belong and how are you land [sic] named?’ Thus the very name of the Indian is his title deed to his home and thus it is that these Indians have contended so fiercely for the possession of the soil...His national pride and patriotism, his peace with other tribes, his home and livelihood for his family, all his interests, everything that is dear to him is associated with his country."

== Notable people ==
- Chipeta, Ouray's wife, Tabeguache
- Ouray (Ute leader), Tabeguache
