= Tamra Borchardt-Slayton =

American politician (born 1987)

Former Chairperson of the Paiute Indian Tribe of Utah and Current Vice-Chairperson of the Paiute Indian Tribe of Utah and Current Indian Peaks Band of Paiutes Chairperson
- Incumbent
- Assumed office June 2017

Personal details
- Born: April 3, 1987 (age 39) Cedar City, Utah, United States
- Spouse: Michael Slayton
- Children: Chanel and Carver
- Education: Southern Utah University and University of Minnesota, Duluth
- Occupation: Politician

Tamra Borchardt-Slayton (born 3 April 1987) is a Paiute politician and the chairperson and leader of the Paiute Indian Tribe of Utah.

== Tenure ==
During her tenure as chairperson, the tribe launched the Paiute Educational Access Camp Experience, a summer camp at Southern Utah University that engages tribal youth around STEM. The program was launched with a grant from the Church of Jesus Christ of Latter-day Saints. She was an advocate for the Bigham Young University Arts Partnership that teaches history for elementary school children through art.

Borchardt-Slayton was a supporter of the Missing Murdered Indigenous Women and Girls Legislation for Utah and was named as a member of the affiliated task force. Her work was included in the inaugural report of the U.S. Department of Justice's Operation Lady Justice initiative. The report quotes Borchardt-Slayton stating:

For far too long, our communities and nations have grieved and mourned for our brothers, sisters, mothers, fathers, grandfathers, grandmothers, aunties, uncles, nieces and nephews. It's time for a clear federal commitment to fund tribal law enforcement, shelters, domestic violence and sexual assault organizations, and to enact policy change that will bring justice to victims, families of victims, survivors, and families of survivors.

— Tamra Borchardt-Slayton, Chairwoman for the Paiute Indian Tribe of Utah Listening Session, May 29, 2020

Borchardt-Slayton's support of MMIW/MMIP was sparked by her desire for justice for her aunt, Kris Jake-Moon and the other families and communities.

There's just a gross injustice happening in the states just for this specific race classification and no one advocates. And I don't mind ever telling anybody this story, because everybody has a story like this in Indian Country.

— Tamra Borchardt-Slayton

Borchardt-Slayton supports the renaming of Utah landmarks and sports teams that are offensive to Native peoples, such as those that use the word squaw, including legislative efforts by state representative. Following the 2020 election of Joe Biden, she endorsed Deb Haaland for secretary of the Department of the Interior.

== See also ==
- List of Native American politicians
- Native American women in politics
