= Uintah tribe =

Native American tribe

The Uintah tribe (Uintah Núuchi, Yoowetum, Yoowetuh, Yoovwetuh, Uinta-at, later called Tavaputs), once a small band of the Ute people, and now is a tribe of multiple bands of Utes that were classified as Uintahs by the U.S. government when they were relocated to the Ute Indian Tribe of the Uintah and Ouray Reservation. The bands included the San Pitch, Pahvant, Seuvartis, Timpanogos and Cumumba Utes.

Uintahs lived between Utah Lake to the Uintah Basin of the Tavaputs Plateau near the Grand-Colorado River-system.
