= San Pitch Utes =

Native American tribe

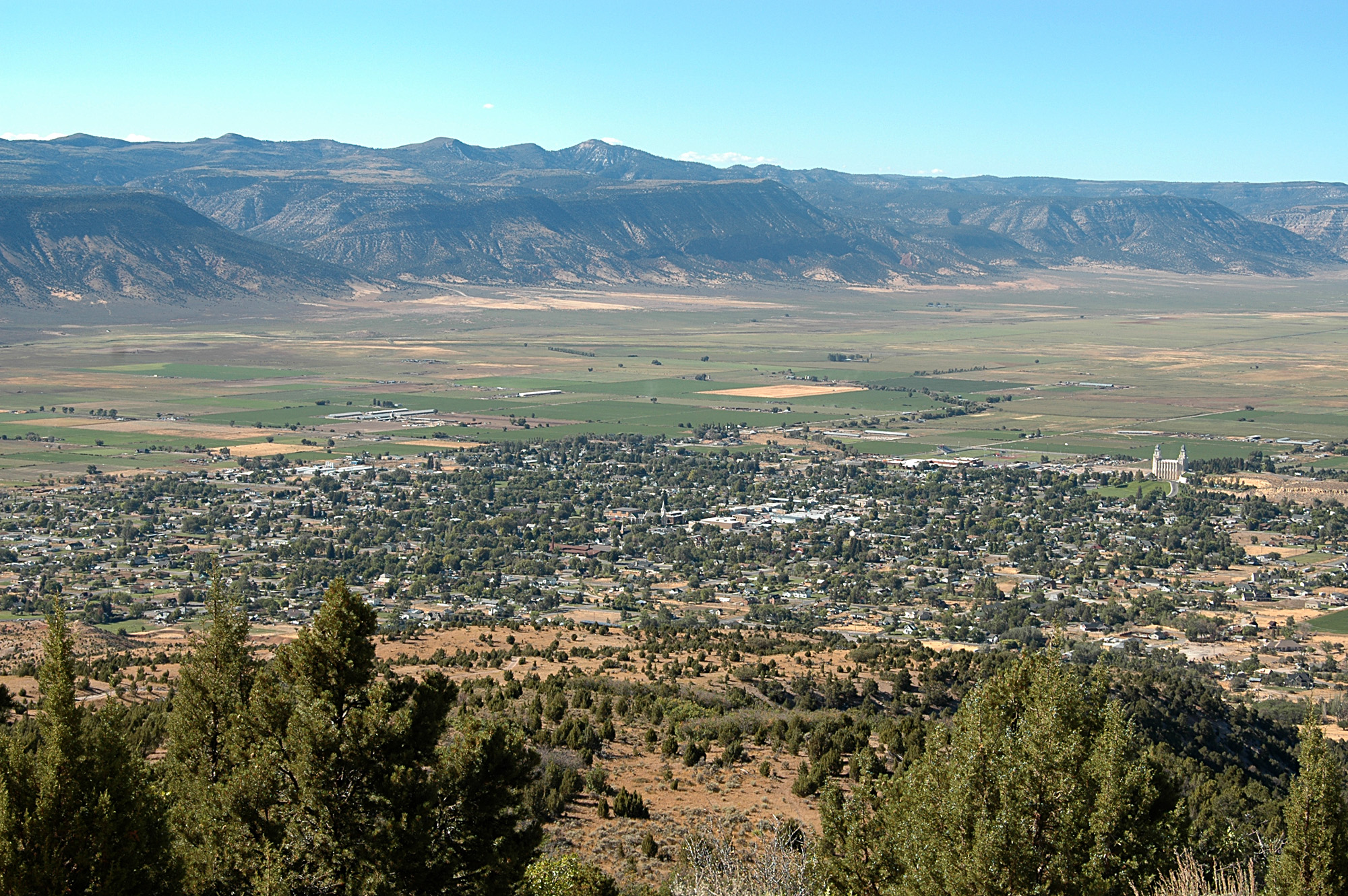
Birdseye view of the town of Manti and the Sanpete Valley

The San Pitch people (Sahpeech, Sanpeech, Sanpits, San-pitch) were members of a Timpanogos band that lived in the Sanpete Valley and Sevier River Valley and along the San Pitch River. They may have originally been Shoshonean, and were generally considered as part of the Timpanogos.

Mormons settled in the Sanpete Valley in the winter of 1849–1850, bringing measles and decimating the San Pitch. Mormons established the town of Manti and the San Pitch continued to camp, hunt, and fish near there. Those who had horses hunted traveled for hunting grounds. Generally, the band was having difficulty finding sufficient food and Chief Sanpitch and Walkara asked the Mormons to teach them how to farm. There were few band members who were interested in embracing agriculture. More than 100 members of the band were baptized in Manti Creek by the Mormons, but many of them made half-hearted conversions and the band continued their traditional ceremonies. They asked settlers for food, which was upsetting to some of the Mormons. Brigham Young assigned Indian Agents for the Pahvant and Uintah tribe districts.

The San Pitch were mistakenly classified as members of the Uintah tribe by the U.S. government when they were relocated to the Uintah and Ouray Indian Reservation.

== Notable people ==
- Chief Aropeen
- Chief Sanpitch, for whom Sanpete County, Utah is named.
