= Pahvant =

Extinct band of Ute people of modern Utah, US

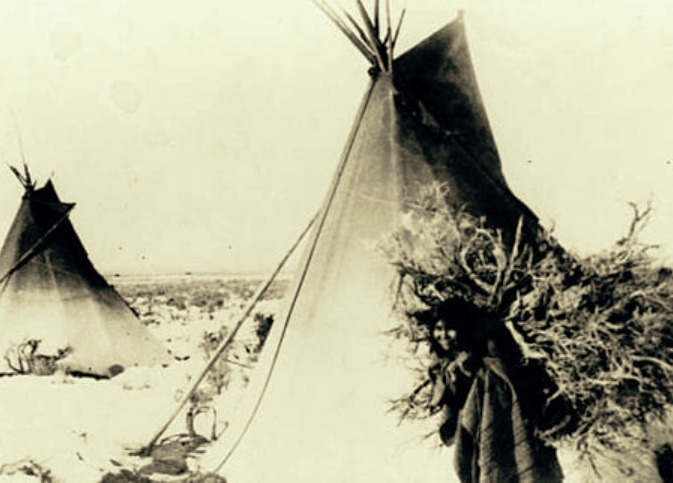
A Pahvant Ute at Kanosh, Utah in 1883

The Pahvant or Pahvants (Pavant, Parant, Pahva-nits) were a band of Ute people that lived in present-day Utah. Called the "Water People", they fished and hunted waterfowl. They were also farmers and hunter-gatherers. In the 18th century they were known to be friendly and attentive, but after a chief's father was killed by emigrating white settlers, a group of Pahvant Utes killed John Williams Gunnison and seven of his men during his exploration of the area. The bodies of water of their homeland were dried up after Mormons had diverted the water for irrigation. Having intermarried with the Paiutes, they were absorbed into the Paiute Indian Tribe of Utah and relocated to reservations.

== Ancestral domain and lifestyle ==
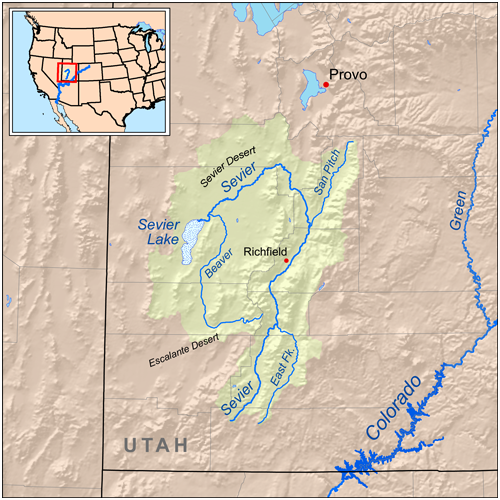
Map showing the Sevier Lake/ Sevier River drainage basin, where the Pahvants lived.

Pahvants lived west of the Wasatch Range in the Pavant Range towards the Nevada border along the Sevier River in the desert around Sevier Lake and Fish Lake, therefore they called themselves Pahvant, meaning "living near the water", or "water people". The Moanunts, another Ute band, lived on the other side of Sevier River. The two bands had the same dialect, but were two distinct groups of people. In their way of living they resembled their neighbors, the Kaibab Paiute, and intermarried with neighboring Goshute and Southern Paiute.

Their hunting and gathering grounds extended west to the present-day border of Utah and Nevada. They camped in six villages during the winter season. The hunted waterfowl and fished along the Sevier River and hunted deer in the mountains. They gathered roots, berries, and pine nuts. They also farmed for many years along Corn Creek. They had horses by the mid-19th century.

== Domínguez–Escalante expedition ==
The Pahvants and the Moanunts were visited in 1776 by the Domínguez–Escalante expedition. The Pahvants were called "Bearded Indians" and were considered friendly and attentive.

== Contact with European-Americans ==
About 1850, Mormons began to move into San Pete and Millard counties, taking the "most valuable lands" of the Pahvant and other tribes and plowing native plants, which resulted in periods of starvation and survival strategies that included begging for food and taking crops and livestock.

The Indians have been driven from their lands and their hunting grounds destroyed without compensation wherefore they are in many instances reduced to a state of suffering, bordering on starvation. In this situation some of the most daring and desperate approach the settlements and demand compensation for their lands, where upon the slightest pretexts, they are shot down or driven to the mountains."

— J. H. Holeman, a Utah Indian superintendent in 1851

Brigham Young's response to Holeman's charge was to deny it and advise Mormons that it was "cheaper to feed Indians than fight them." Young established three farm reserves for local tribes, which became more like feeding stations after the Utes worked the farms for disappointing harvests and because it kept them from hunting, which they needed to sustain themselves. In the fall of 1853, there were a number of conflicts between emigrants to the area and the Pahvant Utes. The Utes raided several towns, killed some settlers, and stole cattle. About October 1853, some pioneers had passed through Pahvant land and were having peaceful communication until they tried to take bows and arrows away from the Utes. A scuffle ensured and the settlers killed the father of Chief Moshoquop and wounded or killed other members of the band.

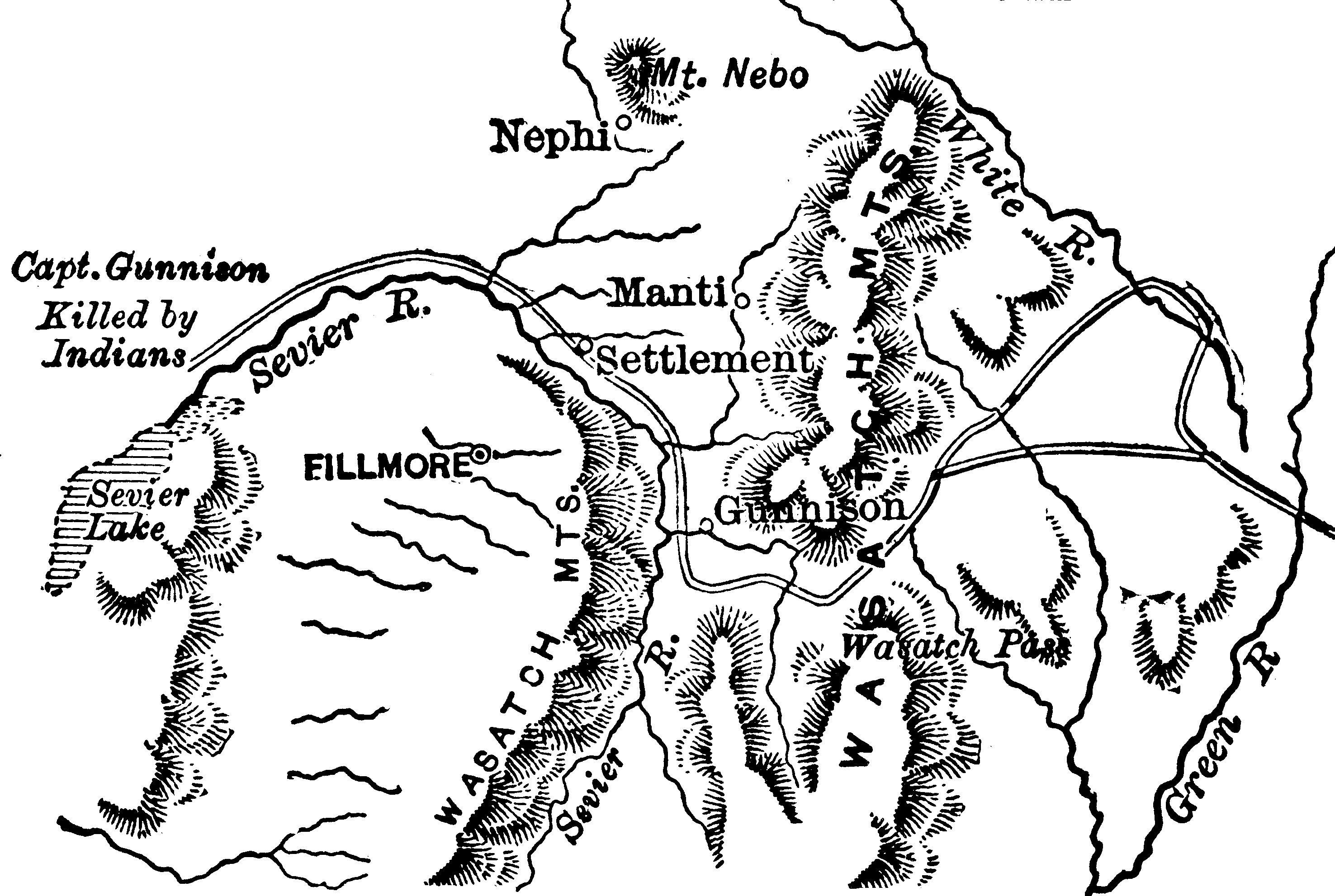
Site of Gunnison Massacre

Captain John Williams Gunnison had come to the area to survey the land for a transcontinental railroad. He heard of the conflict, but believed the issues had been resolved and set up camp on Sevier Lake to explore and survey the area. On the morning of October 26, 1853, a group of Pahvant Utes attacked the camp. They killed Gunnison and seven men with bows and arrows and rifles. Following negotiations with U.S. military and the Mormons, in February 1855 Kanosh arranged for one woman and six men to stand trial for the murder of Gunnison and his men. They were found guilt of Murder in the Second Degree, with three of the tried to be sentenced to three years hard labor and a fine. They were brought to a penitentiary near Salt Lake City, but escaped five days later. It was reported that Mormons played a part in their release.

== Effect of European-American settlement ==
Mormon settlement had reduced access to Ute hunting and gathering grounds. Fish, wildfowl, and native plants were reduced in number. The Mormons brought diseases to which Utes had no immunity and their population was significantly depleted. Grasshoppers and drought destroyed the Mormon's crops, so they did not have extra food to share. River water had been diverted for irrigation by the Mormons, resulting in reduced water levels at Lake Sevier and the rivers.

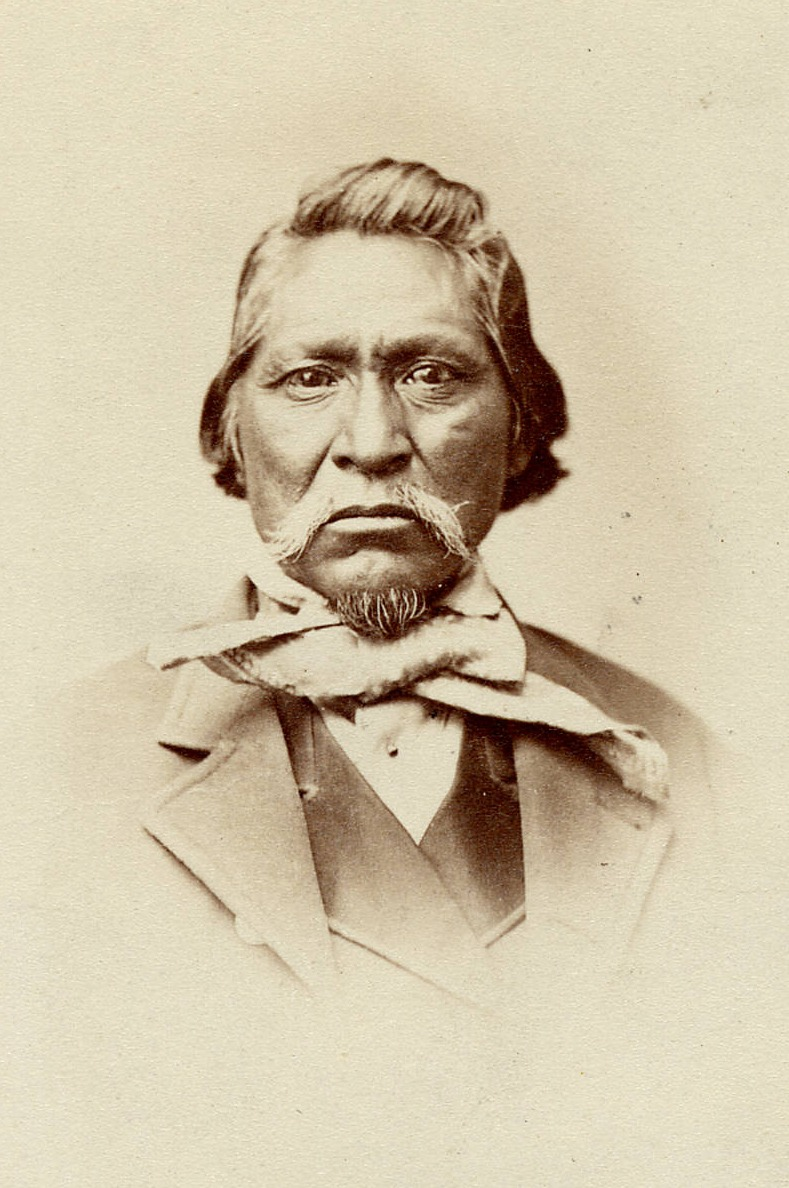
Kanosh, leader of the Pahvant band of the Ute tribe

The Pahvants and the Moanunts were absorbed into the Paiute Indian Tribe of Utah, some of whom lived at the Kanosh reservation, a community of a few houses located north of Kanosh, Utah, or lived off-reservation near Kanosh. Others relocated to the Uintah and Ouray Indian Reservation and were classified as members of the Uintah tribe by the U.S. government.

== Notable people ==
- Kanosh (chief), leader of the Pahvant band

== See also ==
- Walker War, resulting from tension between the Mormon settlers and the Ute Indians
