= Sanpitch (Ute chief) =

Native American tribal leader

Chief Sanpitch
- Born: Utah, United States
- Died: 18 April 1866; Birch Canyon, near Fountain Green, Utah
- Known for: Being the brother of Chief Walkara and fathering Black Hawk
- Children: Black Hawk

Sanpitch (killed April 18, 1866) was a leader of the Sanpits tribe of Native Americans who lived in what is now the Sanpete Valley, before and during settlement by Mormon immigrants. The Sanpits are generally considered to be part of the Timpanogos or Utah Indians

He was the brother of famed Chief Walkara and the father of Black Hawk, for whom the Black Hawk War in Utah (1865–72) is named. In 1850, after measles from newly arrived Mormon settlers decimated their tribes, Walkara and Chief Sanpitch asked the Mormons to come to the Sanpete Valley to teach the band to farm, though this was met with little enthusiasm.

In March 1866, as a ploy suggested by Brigham Young to bring Black Hawk to the bargaining table, the elderly Chief Sanpitch was taken into custody and incarcerated in the jail in Manti. A month later, while he and other jailed Indians were escaping, Sanpitch was shot and wounded. On April 18, 1866, he was found and killed in Birch Creek Canyon (in the San Pitch Mountains, between Fountain Green and Moroni). The two Mormon men responsible for the chief's death buried his body under a rock slide by shooting at the canyon wall overhead. Sanpitch's interactions with early Mormon settlers are chronicled in Gottfredson's History of Indian depredations in Utah.

Sanpitch is almost certainly not the same person as the Shoshone chief of the same name who was alive in 1870.

Some sources indicate that he, or his grandfather of the same name, is the namesake of Sanpete County, the Sanpete Valley, the San Pitch Mountains, and the Sanpitch River. However, all of them share the origin of their names: the Sanpits people. According to William Bright, their name comes from the Ute word saimpitsi, meaning "people of the tules".
