= Paiute Indian Tribe of Utah =

Federally recognized Native American tribe

Total population
- 928

Regions with significant populations
- United States ( Utah)

Languages
- English, Southern Paiute

Religion
- Christianity, Native American Church, traditional tribal religion, previously Ghost Dance

Related ethnic groups
- other Southern Paiute tribes, Chemehuevi, and Ute

The Paiute Indian Tribe of Utah is a federally recognized tribe of Southern Paiute and Ute Indians in southwestern Utah.

== Reservation ==
The Paiute Indian Tribe of Utah (PITU) has a reservation composed of ten separate parcels of land, located in four counties in southwestern Utah.

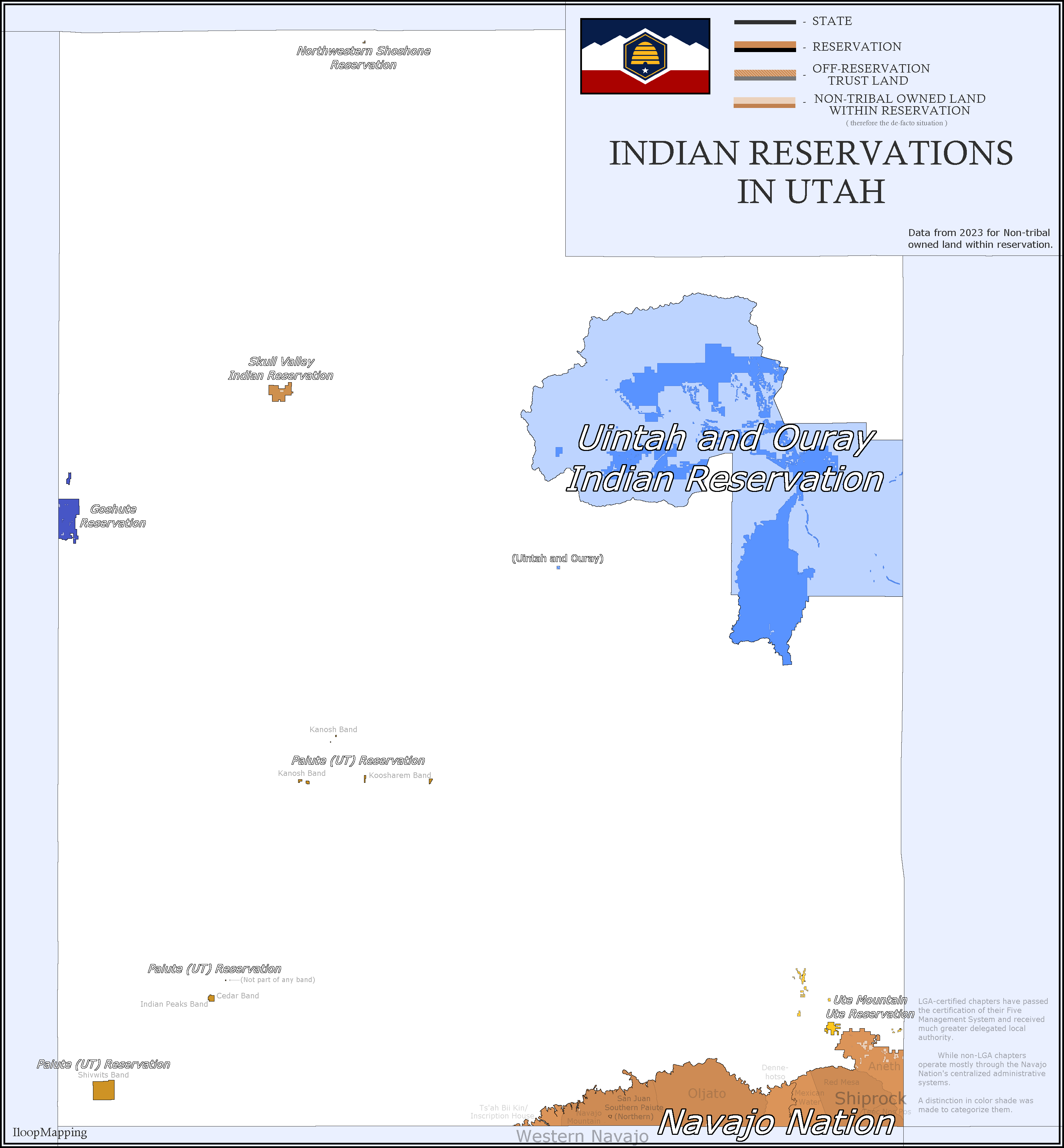
Map of the Paiute (UT) Reservation and neighboring reservations (In dark gold).

== History ==
Two Ute bands were absorbed into the Paiute Indian Tribe of Utah. The Pahvant band originally lived in the deserts near Sevier Lake, west of the Wasatch Mountains of western Utah. Many Pahvants were removed by the US government to the Uintah Reservation, but some joined the Kanosh, Koosharem, and other settlements in Utah. The second band was the Moanunts, who traditionally lived near Sevier River and Otter Creek, south of Salina, Utah.

=== Termination and restoration ===
During the period from the 1940s to 1960s, in which the Indian termination policy was enforced, The Paiute Indian Tribe was targeted for termination. On 1 September 1954 the US Congress passed Termination of Federal Supervision over the Paiute Indians of Utah U.S. Code, Title 25, Sections 741–60. The legislation at §742 specified that the included bands were the Shivwits, Kanosh, Koosharem, and Indian Peaks Bands of the Paiute Indian Tribe (omitting the Cedar Band). As with other termination agreements, the act provided for termination of federal trusts and distribution of tribal lands to individuals or a tribally organized entity. It had provisions to preserve the tribal water rights and a special education program to assist tribal members in learning how to earn a living, conduct affairs, and assume their responsibilities as citizens. The Bureau of Land management terminated tribal trusts on 1 March 1957 as did the Indian Health Service.

On 3 April 1980, Congress passed the Paiute Indian Tribe of Utah Restoration Act, Public Law 96-227 94 Stat. 317, which restored the federal trust relationship of the Shivwits, Kanosh, Koosharem, and Indian Peaks Bands of the Paiute Indian Tribe and restored and reaffirmed that the Cedar Band was part of the Tribe. The law acknowledged that the Kanosh, Koosharem, and Indian Peaks Bands had lost their lands as a result of termination and that the Cedar Band had never had any. It proposed to develop within two years of enactment a plan to secure reservation land for the tribe not to exceed 15,000 acres. The Bureau of Land management reinstituted the federal trust on 43,576.99 acres concurrent with the enactment of the statute.

== 21st century ==
The Paiute Indian Tribe of Utah's tribal headquarters is located in Cedar City, Utah. As of 2006, 840 people were enrolled in the tribe. The Utah Paiute's tribal chairperson is Tamra "Tami" Borchardt-Slayton and their vice-chairperson is Patrick Charles.

The Paiute Tribe made national news when former Chairperson Gari Pikyavit Lafferty was impeached in 2015. After accepting gifts from Washington Redskins owner Dan Snyder which were ostensibly made in an attempt to induce the tribe to publicly endorse the team's controversial name, the Tribal Council charged Gari Pikyavit Lafferty, then tribal chairperson, on March 26, 2015, with violating the tribe's Ethics Ordinance, Constitution and Standards of Conduct as well as ignoring the express directives of the Tribal Council, interfering with internal band matters and misusing her title.

The Paiute Indian Tribe of Utah operates its own programs for health, behavioral care, housing, education, and economic development. Proposed economic development enterprises include geothermal plants, agricultural projects, convenience stores, gift shops, restaurants, hotels, and cultural centers.

== Bands ==
The tribe is made up of five constituent bands, who have been independent communities for centuries.

=== Cedar Band of Paiutes ===
The "Cedar Band of Paiute Indians" or Suh’dutsing ("Cedar People") received federal recognition on April 3, 1980, under the Paiute Indian Tribe of Utah Restoration Act. Their band headquarters is located in Cedar City, Utah. Their band chairperson is Travis N. Parashonts.

=== Kanosh Band of Paiutes ===
The "Kanosh Band of Paiute Indians" or Kawnaw’os ("willow [water] jug") first received federal recognition on February 11, 1929. Their band headquarters is located in Cedar City, Utah. An additional tribal office is located in Kanosh, Utah, near their traditional ancestral home. Their Band Chairperson is Corrina Bow.

=== Koosharem Band of Paiutes ===
The "Koosharem Band of Paiute Indians" or Paw goosawd’uhmpuhtseng ("Water Clover People") first received federal recognition on March 3, 1928. Their band headquarters is located in Richfield, Utah. Their Band Chairperson is LaTosha Mayo.

=== Indian Peaks Band of Paiutes ===
The "Indian Peaks Band of Paiute Indians" or Kwee’choovunt ("Peak People") first received federal recognition on August 2, 1915, and have lands in Beaver County, Utah. Their band headquarters is located in Cedar City, Utah. Their Band Chairperson is Jeanine Borchardt.

=== Shivwits Band of Paiutes ===
The first reservation of the "Shivwits Band of Paiutes" or See’veetseng ("Whitish Earth People") was established in 1891. They received federal recognition on March 3, 1891. They have lands in Washington County, Utah. Their band headquarters is located in Ivins, Utah. Their Band Chairperson is Patrick Charles.

== Tribal flag ==
The Paiute Indian Tribe of Utah has a flag that was officially confirmed in 1997. Within it are several symbols for the tribe. First the colors, white symbolizes purity, the red and black are both for strength and power, and the yellow for healing and life. The biggest symbol is the eagle which represents their deity, then there are a series of images that relate to traditional songs and games the Southern Paiutes would play, the arrowheads that they were known for. Overall the image is supposed to represent a warrior's shield with the five eagle feathers hanging on the bottom representing the 5 modern-day bands that comprise the tribe.
