= Ute dialect =

Colorado River Numic dialect used in the US

Ute
- núu-'apaghapi̱ núuchi
- Native to: United States
- Region: Utah, Colorado
- Ethnicity: Ute
- Language family: Uto-Aztecan: Numic; Southern Numic; Colorado River; Ute

Language codes
- ISO 639-3: –
- Glottolog: utee1244
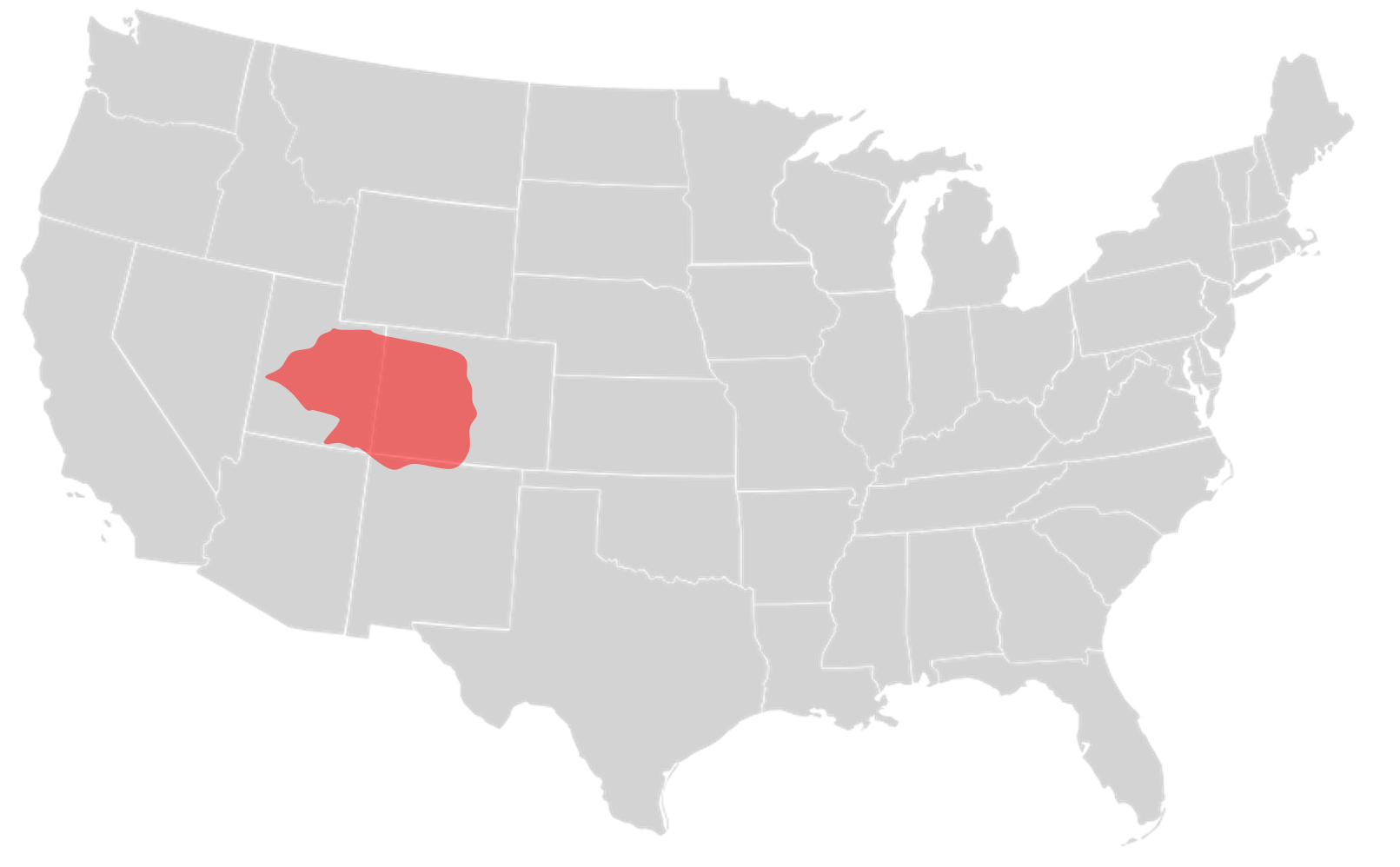
- Area where the Ute dialect is spoken

- People: Núuchi-u
- Language: Núu-'apaghapi; Wanawmanik
- Country: Núuchi Tuvupu

Ute (/ˈjuːt/ YOOT) is a dialect of the Colorado River Numic language, spoken by the Ute people. Speakers primarily live on three reservations: Uintah-Ouray (or Northern Ute) in northeastern Utah, Southern Ute in southwestern Colorado, and Ute Mountain in southwestern Colorado and southeastern Utah. Ute is part of the Numic branch of the Uto-Aztecan language family. Other dialects in this dialect chain are Chemehuevi and Southern Paiute. As of 2010, there were 1,640 speakers combined of all three dialects Colorado River Numic. Ute's parent language, Colorado River Numic, is classified as a threatened language, although there are tribally-sponsored language revitalization programs for the dialect.

Ute as a term was applied to the group by Spanish explorers, being derived from the term quasuatas, used by the Spanish at the time to refer to all tribes north of the Pueblo peoples and up to the Shoshone peoples. The Ute people refer to their own language as núu-'apaghapi̱ or núuchi, meaning 'the people's speech' and 'of the people', respectively.

== Phonology ==
=== Vowels ===
T. Givon (2011) gives the following orthography and phonetic information for Southern Ute. Northern Ute differs from Southern and Central in some lexical and phonological areas.

Southern Ute has five vowels, as well as several allophones, which are not shown in the orthography. Each vowel can be short or long, and vowel length is marked orthographically by doubling the vowel. In Ute, the length of a vowel is often phonemic, and relevant for determining meaning. For example, whca-y, meaning 'wrapping', versus whcáa-y, meaning 'swirling'. In some cases, however, the difference between a long and a short vowel is purely phonetic, and does not change word meaning. Ute devoices vowels in certain phonological or grammatical environments, as described in later sections. Devoiced vowels are marked in the orthography by underlining them, or, when the identity of the underlying vowel has been lost, with the letter [h].

Here, the angle brackets indicate a practical orthographic representation, while the IPA representation is included in square brackets.

	Front		Central	Back	
	unrounded	rounded	Central	unrounded	rounded
High	⟨i⟩ [i]			⟨ʉ⟩ [ɯ]	⟨u⟩ [u]
Mid		⟨ɵ⟩ [œ]			
Low			⟨a⟩ [ä]		

==== Allophones ====
- [ɨ] is an allophone of [ɯ] (written ⟨ʉ⟩).
- [e] and [æ] are both allophones of ⟨a⟩; the former is used more often by younger speakers, while older speakers use the latter.
- [o] is an allophone of [œ] (written ⟨ɵ⟩).

=== Consonants ===
Southern Ute consonants are given in the table below. As above, orthographic representations are bold and the IPA representations are in brackets. All stops in Ute are voiceless. Thus, g here does not indicate a voiced velar stop but rather a voiced velar fricative, similar to luego in Spanish. Also similar to Spanish is the voiced bilabial fricative v, as in the Spanish phrase la verdad, in contrast with the voiced labiodental fricative [v] which does not appear in Ute. The velar sounds k and g have uvular allophones: k becomes either a voiceless uvular stop [q] or a voiceless uvular fricative [χ] when either between two vowels or adjacent to the vowel [o]; likewise g becomes a voiced uvular fricative [ʁ] under the same conditions. Either k or g can become a voiceless velar fricative [x] when before a de-voiced word ending.

Note here that coronals are produced as dental sounds rather than the alveolar sounds used in English.

	Labial	Dental	Palatal	Velar	Glottal
Stop	⟨p⟩ [p]	⟨t⟩ [t]	⟨ch⟩ [tʃ]	⟨k⟩ [k]	⟨'⟩ [ʔ]
Fricative	⟨v⟩ [β]	⟨s⟩ [s]		⟨g⟩ [ɣ]	
Nasal	⟨m⟩ [m]	⟨n⟩ [n]			
Semivowel	⟨w⟩ [w]		⟨y⟩ [j]		
Flap		⟨r⟩ [ɾ]			

==== Allophones ====
- [x] (written ⟨kh⟩), is an allophone of [k] or [ɣ] (⟨k⟩ or ⟨g⟩ respectively).
- [q] and [χ] (written ⟨q⟩ and ⟨qh⟩), are allophones of [k].
- [ʁ] (written ⟨gh⟩), is an allophone of [ɣ].

=== Syllable structure ===
Syllables usually follow the CVCV pattern. All words must begin with a consonant, but other syllables may or may not include an onset. When an onset is present, it is usually composed of only one consonant. Words with suffixes like -'ni, -'na, and 'wa, can have a two-consonant onset, though they were historically -ni-'i, -na-'a, and -wa-'a respectively. These earlier suffix forms did have single-consonant onsets. Most syllables do not have codas, but some codas do appear at word-end, such as in pʉi-n, 'I'm sleeping'.

=== Stress ===
Each Southern Ute word must have one stressed vowel. Either the first or second vowel of a word in Ute may be stressed, with the latter situation being the most common. Stress is orthographically marked when it occurs on the first vowel. In compound words, the primary stress is applied to the first stem, and a secondary stress may also occur on a later stem.

Vowel stress is contrastive in pairs such as, suwá, meaning 'almost', and súwa, meaning 'straight out'. Note that the high back unrounded vowel ʉ often is pronounced as a high central [ɨ] when unstressed. Though this change produces some minimal pairs, it is the destressing, rather than the vowel change, that produces the change in meaning and thus [ɨ] is excluded from the orthography.

=== Phonological processes ===
Ute has several phonological processes that affect the realization of underlying phonemes. Below is a representative sample.

- a changes to [e] or [æ] (usually for younger and older speakers respectively) when near y, i, or ɵ, such as in ɵæ-qarʉ, 'yellow', or 'ura-'æy, 'is'. Although a often makes the alternation when directly preceding or following y, i, or ɵ, it does not have to be directly next to one of those phonemes, such as in sinaævi̱, 'wolf'
- ɵ becomes [o] when directly preceding or following [ʁ], [q], or [χ]—however, k becomes [q] and [qh] between two as or directly preceding or following [o], so the precise mechanism is unknown. qhoqh, 'bull-snake', is one word where this process occurs
- g becomes [ʁ] when between two as or directly preceding or following [o], such as in pagha-'ni, 'walking about'
- w is inserted after g and k if the g or k directly follow u, [o], or ɵ, such as in tagu-kwa, 's/he was thirsty'
  - y is also inserted if directly follow i, such as in ini-kya 's/he did'
- vowels are sometimes devoiced in unstressed word-initial or word-final syllables, or unstressed syllables that begin with a voiceless consonant, nasal consonant, or glide, such as in whcaay, 'swirl'. In marginal pairs, they may be considered distinct, such as in tʉkápi 'food (nominative)' and tʉkápi̱ 'food (accusative)'.

== Morphology ==
Ute is polysynthetic. Affixes are mostly suffixes, but there are three major types of prefixes for verbs and one for nouns.

=== Nouns ===
Most nouns in Ute obligatorily have suffixes. Inanimate nouns usually take the suffix -pʉ/-vʉ. However, this suffix can also sometimes denote animate nouns or body parts. Animate nouns usually take the -chi suffix, but can also take -vi/-pi or -tʉ/-rʉ. The consonant pairs p/v and t/r were once allophones, but are no longer predictable; this produces the suffixes separated by a slash. Some older animate nouns have a silent final vowel rather than an explicit suffix.

-pʉ is also used to derive inanimate nouns from verbs, such as piki-pʉ "rotten thing" from piki- "be rotten". -tʉ/-rʉ are used for animate nouns that derive from verbs or possession: thus, kaá-mi-tʉ "singer" derives from kaá-miy̱a̱ "sings" and piwa-gha-tʉ "married person, spouse" derives from piwa-n "my spouse".

There are three ways plurality can be marked, and only animate nouns are marked for plurality. -u is the most common plural suffix, and -mu is usually used for plural nouns that derive from verbs or possession. These suffixes are placed after the obligatory noun suffix. Finally, some nouns show plurality by reduplication of the first syllable in combination with the -u suffix, such as in táa-ta'wa-chi-u "men" from ta'wa-chi̱. In this case, -u without reduplication would create the dual form: "two men".

=== Verbs ===
Ute verbs can take many suffixes and several prefixes. Negation is marked with both the suffix -wa and prefix ka-. Alternatively, instead of the prefix, the full form kách- can appear as a separate word somewhere before the verb being negated.

First syllable reduplication in verbs denotes the distributive case. Thus, táa-pʉgay-'u "[s/he] kicked him (once)" becomes ta̱-táa-pʉgay-'u "[s/he] kicked him repeatedly".

Incorporation can take place at the leftmost prefix position to add the meanings of the incorporated word to the verb. For example, 'apagha-y "[s/he] is talking" and pia-'apagha-y "[s/he] is sweet-talking".

Verbs usually take the suffix-ka after the stem when the subject is plural. -ka can also be realized as -qa, -kwa, -kya, etc. according to the phonological processes above. Many suffixes are used to denote tense, aspect, and modality. Some of the more common of these suffixes include -y for the present tense, -vaa-ni for the future, and -miy̱a̱. for the habitual. Other suffixes include -ti, -kʉ, and -ta, which mark the causative, benefactive, and passive case respectively.

== Syntax ==
Word order in Ute is flexible and determined primarily by discourse pragmatics, although speakers will mostly use SOV order when producing isolated clauses.

=== Case marking ===
Ute marks nouns for nominative and oblique case. The former category contains subjects and predicates, and the latter contains objects and genitives. In most cases, the final vowel of the entire noun is devoiced in the nominative case and voiced in the oblique case. For example, "woman" in the nominative is mama-chi̱ and in the oblique is mama-chi. In some pronouns, the (voiced) suffix -y is added to mark the oblique case, as in singular "you", which is 'ʉ́mʉ in the nominative and 'ʉ́mʉ-y in the oblique.

=== Noun incorporation ===
As described above in morphology, nouns and other words can be incorporated as prefixes of verbs to specify the method of action: for example, wii-chi-m tʉka-y-aqh, "s/he eats it with a knife" can incorporate wii-chi-m, "knife", into the verb tʉka-y-aqh, "eats" to produce wii-tʉka-y-aqh, "s/he is knife-eating it".

=== Switch reference ===
Switch reference uses the independent pronoun 'uwas, "s/he", or 'umʉs, "they", to refer to a previously introduced subject when there are multiple previously introduced parties, to indicate that the subject of the current clause is different from the previously mentioned subject. For example, in 'áa-gha máy-kya-pʉgay-ku̱, 'ú-vwaa pagha'ni-pʉ̱ga 'uwas, "as they were whispering (amongst themselves), he paced around there", when the sentence begins, the subject is "they", and the independent pronoun is used when the subject changes to "he", a previously introduced character.
