= Council of Energy Resource Tribes =

Consortium of Native American tribes

The Council of Energy Resource Tribes (CERT) is a consortium of Native American tribes in the United States established to increase tribal control over natural resources. Americans for Indian Opportunity, led by LaDonna Harris (Comanche), convened the tribes originally and helped to facilitate the creation of CERT. It was founded in September 1975 by twenty-five tribes under the leadership of the Navajo Nation under chairman Peter MacDonald.

The tribes that make up CERT control 40 per cent of the mineable uranium deposits in the United States, four per cent of its oil and gas, and 30 per cent of the strippable Western coal. CERT's initial goal was to force renegotiation of contracts for natural resources, primarily coal, oil and gas, to increase royalties so as to reflect actual market prices. CERT also lobbied for new federal legislation that would give tribes a larger say in negotiations. While successful in some lawsuits to force renegotiation, CERT also supported popular demonstrations against the energy firms, as well as local and international boycotts, which were often successful where lawsuits had failed. On the legislative front, CERT was a major enabler of both the 1982 Indian Mineral Development Act and the 1982 Federal Oil and Gas Royalty Management Act.
