= San Pitch River =

Coordinates: 39°8′8.8596″N 111°52′31.7352″W

San Pitch River "SanPitch"
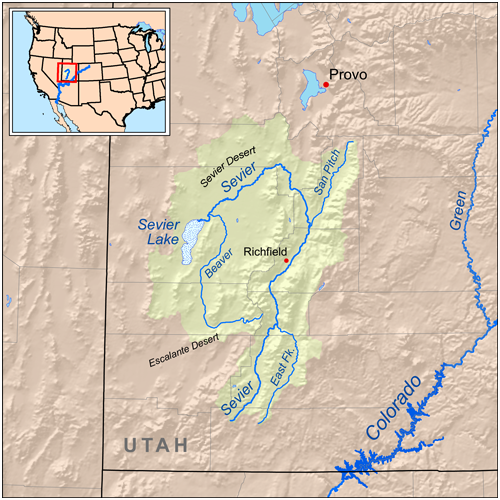
- The San Pitch is to the east of the Great Basin section but within the Great Basin (west of the Great Basin Divide).
- Native name: Sahpeech (Ute)

Location
- Country: United States
- State: Utah

Physical characteristics
- Length: 65 mi (105 km)
- Basin size: 480 sq mi (1,200 km^{2})

Basin features
- River system: Escalante-Sevier subregion

The San Pitch River, extending 65 miles (105 km), is the primary watercourse of the Sanpete Valley and drains into the Sevier River in southwestern Sanpete. The river is named for the Ute chief Sanpitch, who also gives his name to the San Pitch Mountains and Sanpete County.

== Course ==
The upper San Pitch River begins north of Milburn near Oak Creek Ridge on the northern Wasatch Plateau and flows south to Moroni. The middle San Pitch River runs from Moroni, where it crosses Utah State Route 132 (SR‑132). The middle San Pitch River runs from SR‑132 to Gunnison Reservoir. The lower San Pitch River flows from Gunnison Reservoir to where it meets the Sevier River, west of Gunnison.

== See also ==
- List of rivers of Utah
