= Antonga Black Hawk =

Ute war chief

- Born: c. 1830; Alta California, First Mexican Republic (near present-day Spring Lake, Utah)
- Died: September 26, 1870 (aged around 40); Spring Lake Villa, Utah Territory

Antonga, or Black Hawk (c. 1830 – September 26, 1870), was a nineteenth-century war chief of the Timpanogos tribe in what is the present-day state of Utah. He led the Timpanogos against Mormon settlers and gained alliances with Paiute and Navajo bands in the territory against them during what became known as the Black Hawk War in Utah (1865–1872). Although Black Hawk made peace in 1867, other bands continued raiding until the US intervened with about 200 troops in 1872. Black Hawk died in 1870 from a gunshot wound he received while trying to rescue a fallen warrior, White Horse, at Gravely Ford Richfield, Utah, June 10, 1866. The wound never healed and complications set in.

The names "Black Hawk" and "Antonga" by which he was known are not Ute Indian names. "Black Hawk" was a name that Brigham Young, in jest, called the Ute leader. Young's term became the name by which he is now most commonly known. There were some three or more Indians the whites referred to as Black Hawk in Utah history. It is reminiscent of Chief Black Hawk of the Sauk and Meskwaki peoples and the Black Hawk War of 1832 in Illinois, where the Mormons had migrated from.

To the Mexicans he was known as "Antonga", also not a Ute name. The Timpanogos had long established trade relations with the Mexicans. Utah's Black Hawk was the son of Chief Sanpitch; in the Dominguez Escalante Journal: Their Expedition Through Colorado Utah Arizona and New Mexico in 1776, Escalante describes having come in contact with aboriginal peoples who were Snake-Shoshoni who called themselves "Timpanogostzis", an Aztecan-Shoshonian word meaning "People of the Rock water carriers" (referring to rock salt), whose leader was Turunianchi. Turunianchi had a son named Munch.

Munch was the father of Sanpitch, Wakara, Arropeen, Tabby, Ammon, Sowiette, and Grospeen, who occupied a land that is now known as Utah. Dominguez named Mount Timpanogos, Timpanogos River (Provo River), Timpanogos Lake (Utah Lake) and Timpanogos Valley (Utah Valley) in honor of these people, an honor that remains to this day. Government maps that predate Mormon settlement support this fact. Then in 1824, explorer Etienne Provost entered what is now Utah and reported having come in contact with a Snake-Shoshone tribe (Timpanogos) living along the Timpanogos River (Provo River) and Timpanogos Lake. Provo City derives its name from this early explorer.

== History ==
In 1847 the first Mormon pioneers arrived in the territory, where indigenous peoples had lived for thousands of years. Historic tribes included the Timpanogos, Paiute and Navajo. In 1865 Black Hawk and the Timpanogos started raiding the livestock and goods of the steadily encroaching settlers. The white population had dramatically increased to about 50,000 at a time when the Timpanogos population is estimated to have been 15,000 to 20,000. Epidemics of measles and smallpox had caused many deaths among the Timpanogos, as they had no immunity to the new diseases; the rate of tuberculosis (TB) was high because of the weakened condition of the people. Mormon farming of domesticated crops and animals had altered the environment, driving off the game which was the Timpanogos' main source of food. By 1865 hundreds of Timpanogos were starving.

When Chief Wah-Kara died unexpectedly in 1855, his brother Arapeen succeeded him and, when Chief Arapeen too died in 1860, his son Jake Arropeen (also known as Yene-wood) became chief by succession. In 1865 the Mormons and Utes were negotiating to reach some sort of agreement at Manti; discussions ended when Arropeen was pulled from his horse by the settler John Lowry, who was believed to be drunk at the time. Dishonored before his people, Chief Arropeen considered the incident a grave insult in a 30-year history of encroachment and depredations against the Ute people. Retaliating for the insult, that day Black Hawk raided some settlers for cattle and soon his forces killed five men. He was then about 35 years old. This marked the start of what the Mormons later named "The Black Hawk War".

The Black Hawk War in Utah began in 1865 and ended in 1872. It was a three-part war, involving 16 tribes of the Timpanogos, and allied bands of Paiute and Navajo, who declared war against the Mormon settlers. For years the US government ignored requests for aid from the Mormons, as many Federal leaders wanted to displace the LDS Church from its dominance of settlers in Utah. Mormon settlers fought to maintain control of what they called "Zion", long the traditional territory of the Ute people.

The 21st-century Utah historian John Alton Peterson describes Black Hawk as having

remarkable vision and capacity. Given the circumstances under which he operated, he put together an imposing war machine and masterminded a sophisticated strategy that suggest he had a keen grasp of the economic, political, and geographic contexts in which he operated. Comparable to Cochise, Sitting Bull and Geronimo, Black Hawk fostered an extraordinary pan-regional movement that enabled him to operate in an enormous section of country and establish a three-faced war. Black Hawk worked to establish a barrier to white expansion and actually succeeded in collapsing the line of Mormon settlement, causing scores of villages in over a half dozen counties to be abandoned. For almost a decade the tide of white expansion in Utah came to a dead stop and in most of the territory actually receded. Like other defenders of Indian rights, though, Black Hawk found he could not hold his position, and his efforts eventually crumbled.

Ute history notes that Black Hawk made peace with the "pale-faces" in 1867. He visited every white village from Cedar City to Payson to plead with the settlers to try to make peace. Without his leadership, the conflict was reduced, but raids continued until US forces intervened in 1872. Black Hawk died in 1870, before the end of the war, of tuberculosis.

The Black Hawk War was not a single incident, but a series of raids and small-scale conflicts. More than 150 engagements took place over a seven-year period throughout Utah territory and the conflict spilled over into Colorado, Idaho, and Wyoming. Although migration had slowed during the war years, soon tens of thousands of Mormon pioneers entered the area again, at the rate of 3,000 a month. By contrast, in 1909 an official government census showed that the Ute population had declined to just 2,400.

== See also ==
- Utah War for more about Mormon and US government battles
