= White River Utes =

White River Utes are a Native American band, made of two earlier bands, the Yampa from the Yampa River Valley and the Parianuche Utes who lived along the Grand Valley in Colorado and Utah.

== Historic bands ==
=== Yampa ===
The Yampa (Yapudttka, Yampadttka, Yamparka, Yamparika) lived in the Yampa River Valley area and north of White River of the present-day state of Colorado near the Parianuche who lived to the south. They were called "root eaters". The tribe was relocated to the Uintah and Ouray Indian Reservation.

=== Parianuche ===
The Parianuche (Pahdteeahnooch, Pahdteechnooch, Parianuc) lived in the Colorado River valley (or Grand Valley) in western Colorado and eastern Utah. They are called "elk people" and Grand River Utes. The tribe was relocated to the Uintah and Ouray Indian Reservation.

== Meeker Battle ==
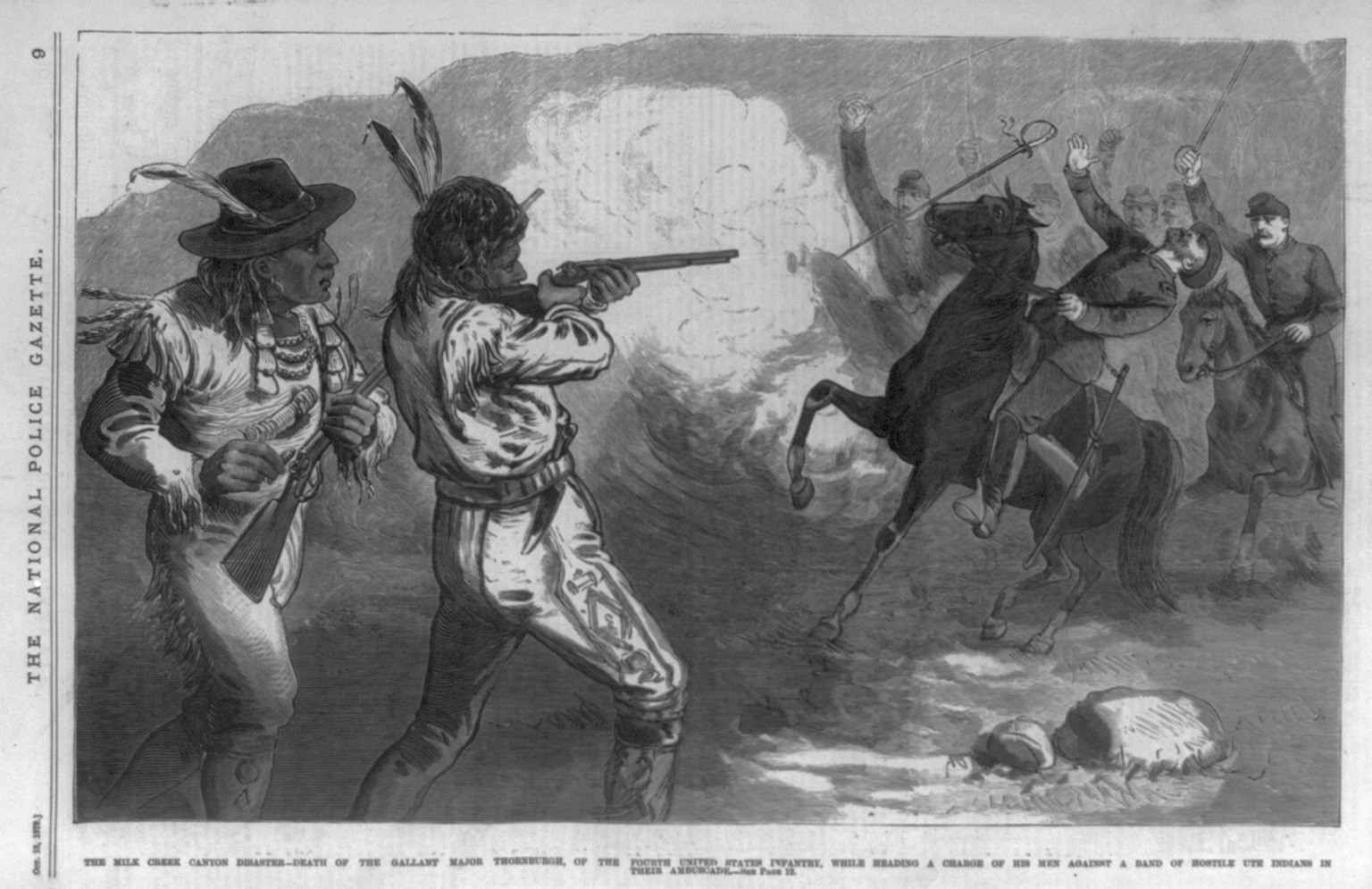
The Milk Creek Canyon disaster - death of the gallant Major Thornburgh, of the Fourth United States Infantry, while heading a charge of his men against a band of hostile Ute Indians in their ambuscade, 1879.

The White River Utes were pressured to give up their hunter-gatherer lifestyle and take up farming in 1879. This was pressed upon them by an Indian agent, Nathan Meeker, through a number of means, destruction of Ute ponies, starvation, and sending for the military. The Utes took a defensive stand against the military and the agent, killing the agent and U.S. Army Commander Thomas Thornburgh in two separate conflicts. There were also Utes and other whites killed in what was called the Meeker Massacre and the Thornburgh ambush. This ultimately led to the White River Utes being moved to the Uintah and Ouray Reservation in Utah.

== Resettlement in South Dakota ==
A small number of White River Utes were resettled on the Cheyenne River Reservation, South Dakota, in 1906 and 1907, being allocated 4 townships totalling 92,160 acres. That land remains in the former northern part of the Cheyenne River Reservation. Their communities are Iron Lightning and Thunder Butte.
