= Chief Peteetneet =

Native American clan leader and slave trader

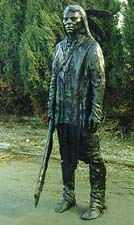
A statue of Peteetneet outside Peteetneet Museum and Cultural Arts Center

Chief Peteetneet, or more precisely Pah-ti't-ni't (pronounced Paw-tee't-nee't), was a clan leader of a band of Timpanogos who lived near Peteetneet Creek, which was named for him (or perhaps for which he was named), in what is now known as Payson, Utah, United States.

== Description ==
His band was semi-nomadic, living in semi-permanent, grass-thatched, wattle-and-daub houses, and roamed throughout the Utah Lake area as well as Sanpete and Sevier counties. Together with Chief Tabby-To-Kwanah, they led seasonal migrations through the canyon each spring and fall. His daughter Pomona (Pamamaci = "Water-woman") married the mountain man, Miles Goodyear. Peteetneet is the anglicized approximation of Pah-ti't-ni't, which in Timpanogos means "our water place".

In February 1850, the Mormon militia attacked his village as part of the Battle at Fort Utah. Although Peteetneet was not there at the time of the attack, he did confront the soldiers at Fort Utah after finding the bodies of several decapitated Timpanogo.

When the first Mormon pioneers arrived on Peteetneet Creek in late October 1850, they found that Chief Peteetneet was friendly, along with his band of about 200 Timpanogos. The Mormon pioneers settled on an uninhabited section of the creek about a mile southeast of Peteetneet's village. It is unlikely that the settlement on Peteetneet Creek would have survived the winter without the benevolence of Chief Peteetneet and his band.

Chief Peteetneet also enjoyed the support of Mormon leaders in the Native American slave trade. Apostle George A. Smith gave him talking papers that certified "it is my desire that they [Captain Walker and Peteetneet] should be treated as friends, and as they wish to Trade horses, Buckskins and Piede children, we hope them success and prosperity and good bargains."

Chief Peteetneet died on December 23, 1861, under somewhat mysterious circumstances in Cedar Valley, Utah, near recently abandoned Fort Crittenden (Camp Floyd). He was buried on the mountainside in Cedar Valley by members of his band. His wife, murdered by an axe-wielding woman in his band on express orders near his deathbed, was buried in the valley below his grave to accompany him into the afterlife. He was succeeded at the time of his death in 1862 by a near relative named Ponnewats, a corruption of Pa-ni-wa-tsi, meaning "Little Master of Our Water".

Utah Brian Bird sculpted a monument to Chief Peteetneet in 1993, which stands at the front of the Peteetneet Museum and Cultural Arts Center.

== See also ==
- Act for the relief of Indian Slaves and Prisoners
- Mormonism and slavery
