= Tabby-To-Kwanah =

Timpanog leader

Chief Tabby

Chief Tabby-To-Kwanah (or Tabby, Tabiona, or Tabiuna; c. 1789 – 1898) was the leader of Timpanogos group of Native Americans when they were displaced from their homeland near Utah Lake, to the Uintah and Ouray Indian Reservation several hundred miles to the east in modern-day Utah.

He rose to power as a young man and was sub-chief under his cousin Chief Walkara when the Mormon pioneers first arrived in Timpanogos territory in 1847. He was one of the principal clan leaders over a band in southern Utah Valley, along with Chief Peteetneet and Grospene. He was a grandson of Turunianchi, who was the leader when the Timpanogos first contacted the Europeans during the Dominguez–Escalante Expedition. Turunianchi's grandsons made up the royal line of "brothers" (even though they were cousins) referred to by Brigham Young. Tabby-To-Kwanah means "Child of the Sun." Tabiona, Utah is named after him.

After the Mormon pioneers established Fort Utah along the Provo River in the northern part of Utah Valley, there began to be significant conflict between the pioneers and the tribe that lived along the Provo River. In February 1850, Brigham Young reversed his earlier policy of friendship towards indigenous groups and issued an extermination order against male Timpanogos in all of Utah Valley When the Mormon militia attacked the Timpanogos along the Provo River, the main party fled to southern Utah Valley, where Chief Tabby-To-Kwanah's band was situated. The Mormon militia then came to the Timpanogos villages along the Spanish Fork River and the Peteetneet Creek. The Mormons promised to be friendly to the Timpanogos, but then lined up the men to be executed in front of their families. Some attempted to flee across the frozen lake, but the Mormons ran after them on horseback and shot them. At least eleven Timpanogos were killed. Altogether, 102 Timpanogos were killed in the Battle at Fort Utah. The Timpanogos who had died were decapitated and left unburied. When Chief Tabby-To-Kwanah returned with Chief Peteetneet and Grospene, they found the decapitated bodies of their band members and angrily confronted the settlers at Fort Utah.

Chief Tabby-To-Kwanah was instrumental in trying to establish peace between the Mormon pioneers and the Timpanogos. He was one of the main chiefs that sat in peace negotiations and signed the Shoshone Goship treaty of peace in 1863 and the Spanish Fork Treaty in 1865. When Antonga Black Hawk led the Black Hawk War in Utah, he led the Timpanogos who wanted peace on the Uintah and Ouray Indian Reservation. While he strove to have his people follow the terms of the Spanish Fork Treaty, the US government did not follow their side of the treaty, partially because Brigham Young did not have authority to speak for the US government. As a sign of protest, he led the Timpanogos into Thistle Valley in Sanpete County to hunt and dance in the spring of 1872. This made the Americans uneasy, and he was able to get the Americans to fulfill their obligations for that year.

Chief Tabby-To-Kwanah died at the age of 109, in the Skull Valley Indian Reservation where he had also been born.
