= Battle at Fort Utah =

1850 killing of over 40 Native Americans by Mormon settlers

Provo River Massacre
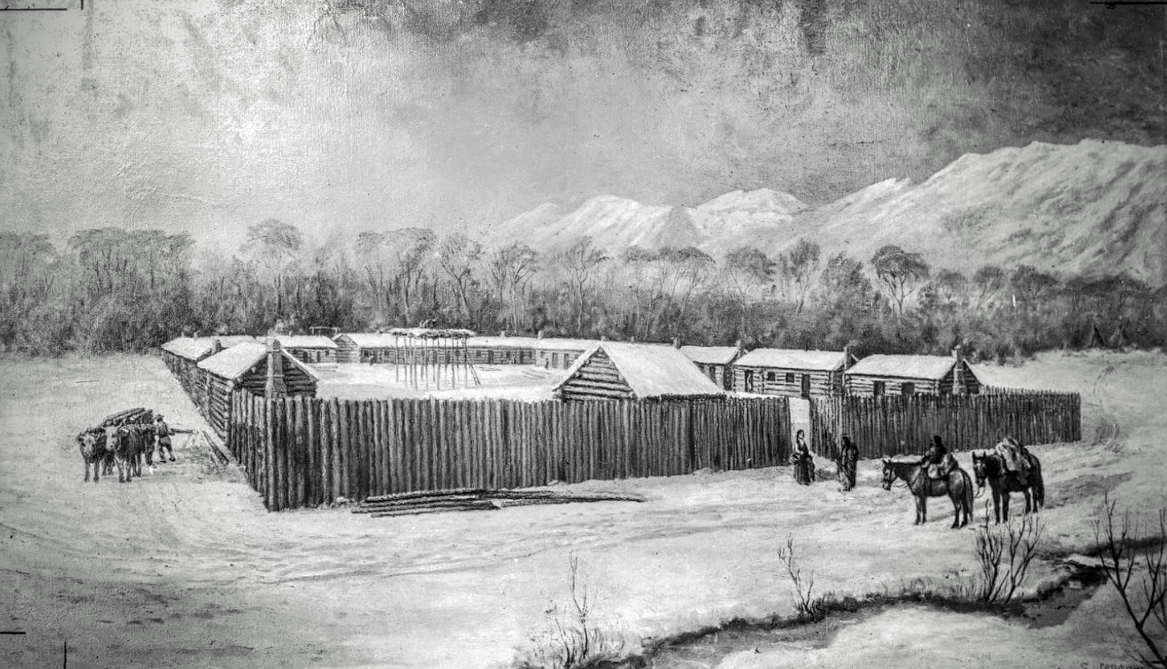
- Artist's depiction of Fort Utah in 1849
- Location: 40°15′18″N 111°39′58″W; Provo River, Rock Canyon, and Utah Lake near Provo, Utah
- Date: February 8–17, 1850
- Target: Timpanogos people
- Attack type: Punitive Expedition
- Weapons: Guns, cannon
- Deaths: 40–100 men and 1–2 woman; 1 militiaman killed
- Perpetrator: Orders of Brigham Young to the Mormon militia
- Motive: Retaliation for cattle theft

The Provo River Massacre (also known as the Battle at Fort Utah, or Fort Utah Massacre) was a violent attack and massacre in 1850 in which 90 Mormon militiamen surrounded an encampment of Timpanogos families on the Provo River, and laid siege for two days. They eventually shot between 40 and 100 Native American men and one woman with guns and a cannon during the siege and subsequent pursuit, capture, and execution of the two groups that fled during the last night. One militiaman died and eighteen were wounded from return fire during the siege.

Of the Timpanogos people who fled in the night, one group escaped southward, and the other ran east to Rock Canyon. Both groups were captured, however, and the men were executed. Over 40 Timpanogos children, women, and a few men were taken as prisoners to nearby Fort Utah. They were later taken northward to the Salt Lake Valley and sold as slaves to church members there. The bodies of up to 50 Timpanogos men were beheaded by some of the settlers and their heads put on display at the fort as a warning to the mostly women and children prisoners inside.

Before the massacre the Timpanogos people initially tolerated the new presence of the settlers from the Church of Jesus Christ of Latter-day Saints (LDS Church) who had only recently begun moving south into Utah Valley in the past year from the main settlement in the Salt Lake Valley. The two groups enjoyed some moments of mutual friendship.

Tensions rose, however, when, according to LDS settler accounts, in January 1850 a Timpanogos man (called Old Bishop) stole an item of clothing from an LDS person, and three LDS men retaliated by murdering him. A group of Timpanogos people responded to the murder by stealing around 50 cattle. Settlers in Fort Utah petitioned leaders in Salt Lake City to go to war with the group. Isaac Higbee, Parley P. Pratt and Willard Richards convinced Brigham Young to exterminate any Timpanogos hostile to the Mormon settlement. Young sent the Nauvoo Legion down with Captain George D. Grant and later sent General Daniel H. Wells to lead the army. After the Timpanogos defended themselves from within their village and an abandoned cabin, they fled their camp. The Mormons pursued the Timpanogos people from Chief Old Elk's tribe and killed any other Timpanogos people they found in the valley.

== Buildup ==
January 26, 1850 meeting minutes of Brigham Young and his council deciding whether to attack the Utah Valley Indians. The last line is Brigham Young's motion, "I say go and kill them," which was unanimously approved.

=== Mormon settlers massacre Timpanogos men at Battle Creek ===
Around February 1849, Dimick B. Huntington spoke with Timpanogos leader Little Chief about some of the settlers' missing cattle. Little Chief said that Roman Nose and Blue Shirt were great thieves who had decided to live off of the settlers' cattle all winter. Little Chief said that the Mormons should kill these renegades, perhaps out of fear that his tribe would be blamed and killed for the missing cattle. Captain John Scott took fifty men into Utah Valley to put a "final end" to the "depredations.".

The next month on March 3, Scott's men made their way down the Provo River and asked Little Chief and his camp about where the men accused of stealing cattle were. Little Chief's tribe was understandably worried about the fifty armed White men, and Little Chief agreed to show Scott where the accused group was. Little Chief's two sons led Scott's men to a camp near Battle Creek Canyon. Scott's men surrounded the camp of several men and their families. The surrounded group refused to talk and opened fire on the company, even though they were considerably weaker. Scott's men threw rocks at those fleeing in the creek, which caused the women and children to surrender. Pareyarts and Opecarry (aka Stick-in-the-Head), both leaders of local Timpanogos tribes, watched the settlers "relentlessly shoot down" the remaining Timpanogos. This contributed to their later mistrust of the settlers during the events preceding the Provo River Massacre.

=== Initial Mormon settlement ===
On March 10, 1849, Brigham Young assigned 30 families to settle Utah Valley, with John S. Higbee as president and translator Dimick B. Huntington and Isaac Higbee as counselors. They headed towards Timpanogos territory with 30 families or 150 people. It is likely that the settlers arrived on April 1 and began construction of the fort on April 3. The Timpanogos viewed this as an invasion of their territory and sacred land. As the settlers tried to move into the valley, they were actively blocked by a group of Timpanogos led by An-kar-tewets with warnings that trespassing would be met with death. D. Robert Carter suggests that An-kar-tewets was probably demanding a tribute for the travels of the caravan through their territory. Later, a Timpanogos chief met with Huntington, possibly Black Elk. Huntington said that the settlement would be beneficial for the Timpanogos and reported that the leader consented to the Mormons settling there after Huntington swore they would not drive the Timpanogos off their lands or take away their rights.

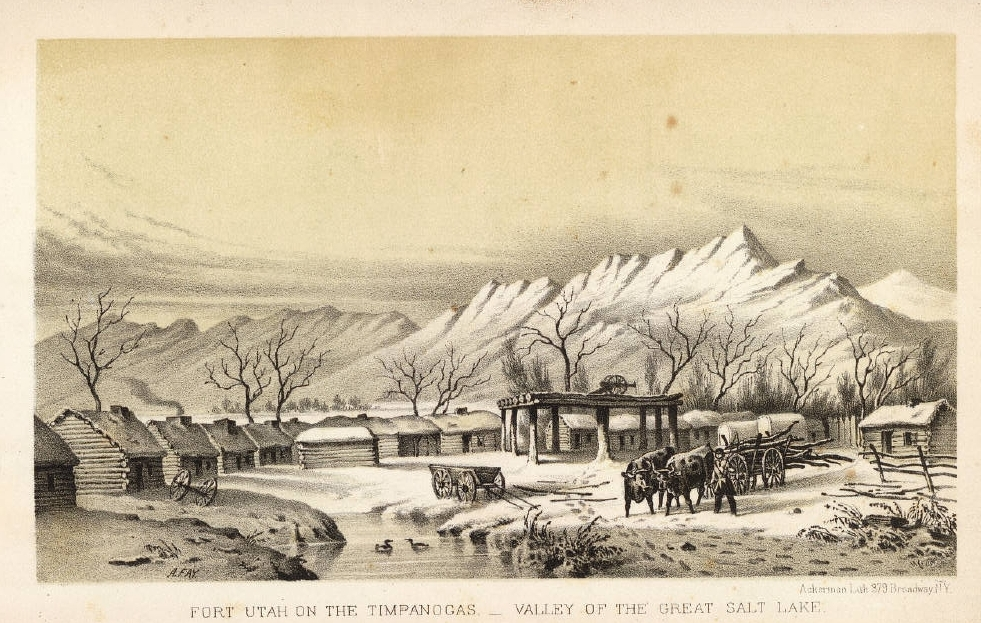
Illustration of the inside of Fort Utah in 1850 showing the cannon platform that would be used to shelter the surviving prisoners

The settlers built a stockade called Fort Utah and armed it with a twelve-pound cannon to intimidate the Timpanogos. They also built several log houses, surrounded by a tall 14-foot (4.3 m) palisade 330 by 165 feet [101 by 50 m], with gates in the east and west ends, and an elevated middle deck for the cannon. The surrounding land was divided into 58, 5-acre (2 ha) lots.

Relations between the two groups seemed to warm, with Mormons and Timpanogos fishing and gambling together. Brigham Young disapproved of their familiarity with one another and advised Huntington and Alexander Williams to be the sole traders. Parley P. Pratt visited and made rules against gambling with the Timpanogos and against shooting near the fort.

The fort was built on the sacred grounds for the annual fish festival and very close to the main Timpanogos village on the Provo River. The settlers fenced off pastures. Their cattle would eat and trample the seeds and berries that were an important part of the Timpanogos diet. They used gill nets to catch fish, which left little for the Timpanogos to eat. With traditional sources of food gone, they soon experienced massive starvation. The new presence of settlers also exposed the longtime residents of Utah Valley to measles, and they began dying in large numbers.

=== Old Bishop's murder ===
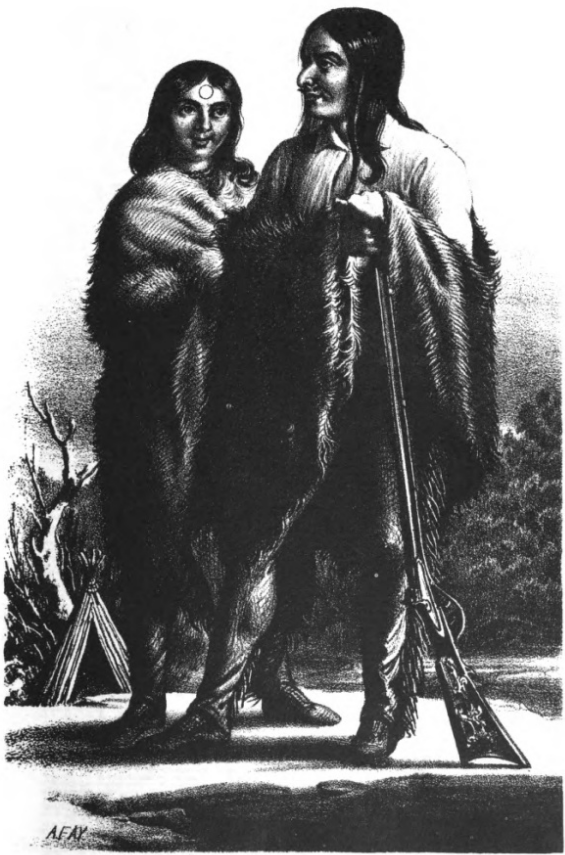
Drawing of Timpanogos leader Pareyarts (Old Elk) and his wife.

In August, a Timpanog named Old Bishop was murdered by Rufus Stoddard, Richard Ivie, and Gerome Zabrisky over a shirt they wanted from him. Another account from Thomas Orr states that the Timpanogos agreed not to take the settlers' cattle if they would not kill their wild game. Old Bishop discovered the men hunting deer, expressed his displeasure, and the men killed him. They filled his body with rocks and threw it in the Provo River. The men went back to Fort Utah and openly bragged about the murder. The Timpanogos found the body and discovered that Richard Ivie was involved in the murder. The Timpanogos were angry, and demanded that the murderers be handed over, to which the settlers refused. The Timpanogos asked for material compensation for Old Bishop's death according to Timpanogos custom, which the settlers also refused, which enraged the Timpanogos, given how they were sharing prime pasture and fishing land. Some Timpanogos shot at cattle that were trespassing on their land or took the settlers' corn in response.

In October, apostle Charles C. Rich negotiated a peace treaty, and Brigham Young again advised Fort Utah not to hold the Timpanogos as equals, but to "have dominion" over them. Winter was especially hard and Timpanogos took 50–60 cattle for food. California-bound forty-niners traded with Timpanogos groups, giving them more guns and ammunition. Williams kicked Pareyarts out of Mrs. Hunt's house after he asked for some medicine for measles, and later, three of Mrs. Hunt's cattle went missing. By January 1850, settlers of Fort Utah reported to officials in Salt Lake City that the situation was getting dangerous. They wanted a military party to attack the Timpanogos. Not knowing the story of Old Bishop's murder, Brigham Young noted that a white man wouldn't be murdered over stealing an item like a shirt or ox, and said that the Timpanogos shouldn't be killed over theft either.

=== Planning the attack ===
General Wells Special Order Number 1, instructing "exterminating such as do not separate themselves from their hostile clans".

On January 31, 1850, Isaac Higbee, who had replaced John Higbee as bishop of Fort Utah, met with Governor Brigham Young, militia leader General Daniel H. Wells and the First Presidency and the Quorum of the Twelve Apostles to petition Young for a war order. He stated that all the occupants of Fort Utah were in agreement that they should go to war. Apostles Parley P. Pratt and Willard Richards argued for the killing of the Timpanogos, since losing Fort Utah would cut off communication to the southern Utah colonies. Young was also concerned that losing Fort Utah would disrupt his plans to settle other fertile valleys and have a route to California. He ordered an extermination campaign against the Timpanogos, with orders to kill all the Timpanogos men, but to spare the women and children if they behaved. General Wells drafted the extermination order as Special Order No. 2 and sent them to Captain George D. Grant on January 31. In his letter, he told Grant "Take no hostile Indians as prisoners" and "let none escape but do the work up clean".

On February 1, Brigham Young met with Captain Howard Stansbury of the U.S. Topographical engineers who was in Utah mapping Utah Lake and the Great Salt Lake. Stansbury had also been a victim of cattle theft and supported Young's decision to go to war by providing supplies and the services of his physician. On February 2, Brigham Young announced his decision to the general assembly, and General Wells called for volunteers. On February 4, Captain Grant headed towards Fort Utah, followed shortly by Major Andrew Lytle.

== The attack ==
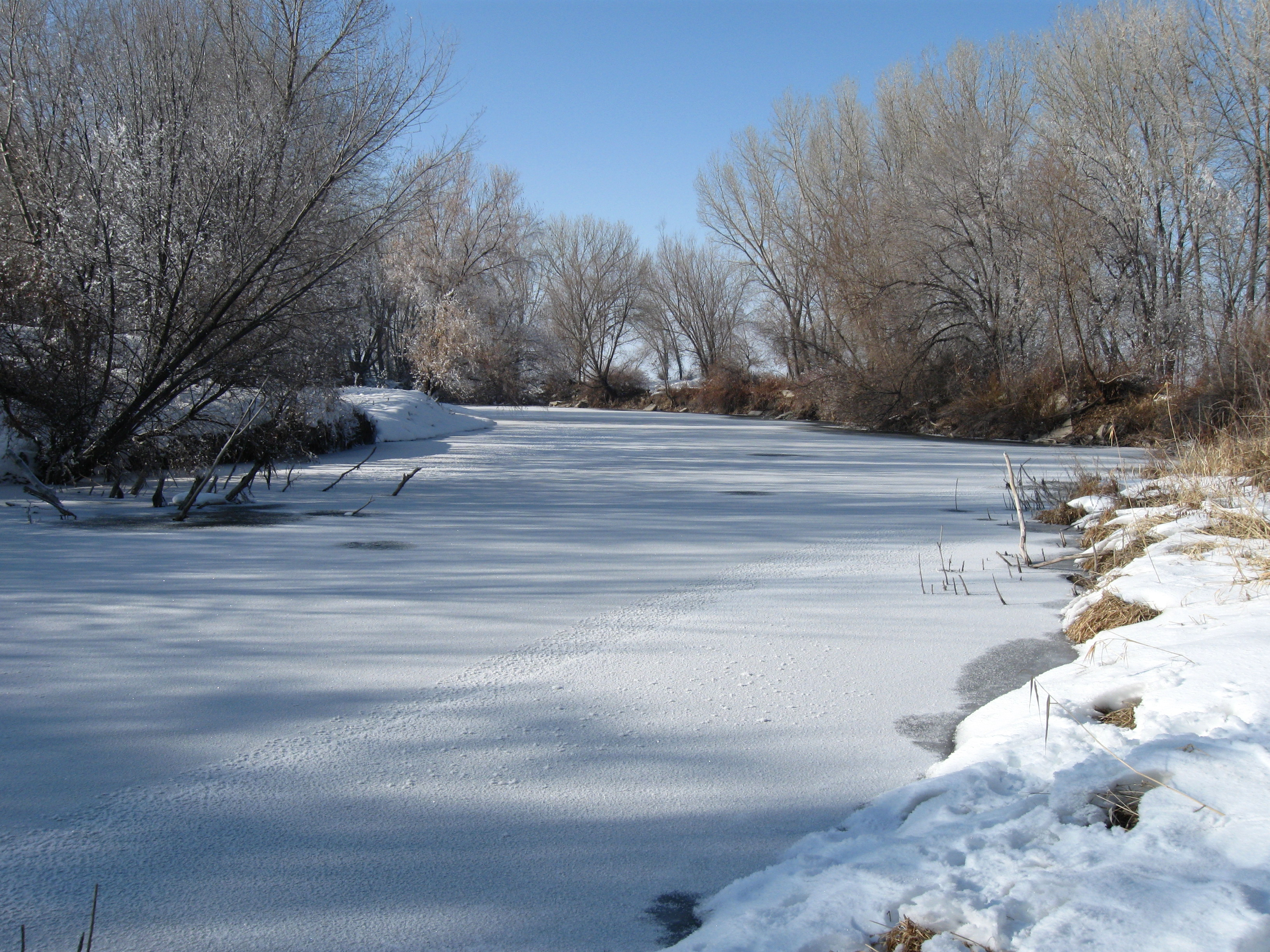
An area of the lower Provo River near Utah Lake in winter, similar to how the area around where the Native American encampment was would have looked in February 1850.

The Timpanogos had fortified their village with barricades made from stacked logs and fallen timber. The fortifications housed seventy warriors and their families. The Timpanogos were headed by Pareyarts, who was sick from the measles. Some Timpanogos who were friends with some of the settlers sought shelter in Fort Utah before the battle, including Antonga, whom the Mormons called "Black Hawk".

The Nauvoo Legion was sent from Salt Lake City and on February 8, they engaged the Timpanogos in battle. Their initial strategy was to encircle the Timpanogos village and kill all hostile Timpanogos. The Timpanogos fortified themselves in an abandoned cabin, and the first day ended in a stalemate. Pareyarts's braves were probably joined by warriors from villages on the Spanish Fork river and Peteetneet Creek. The next day, the soldiers mounted shields on sledges and the defending Timpanogos suffered about ten casualties and Chief Opecarry was wounded. Joseph Higbee, son of Isaac Higbee, was the only casualty of the Mormons. The Timpanogos fled during the night after the second day of fighting. They split into two groups. Pareyarts took a small group of wounded and sick and fled to Rock Canyon. Opecarry took the rest of the Timpanogos towards the Spanish Fork River. Black Hawk was sent by the militia to scout out the village the next morning, and it was deserted except for the bodies of around ten Native American people shots by the Nauvoo Legion.

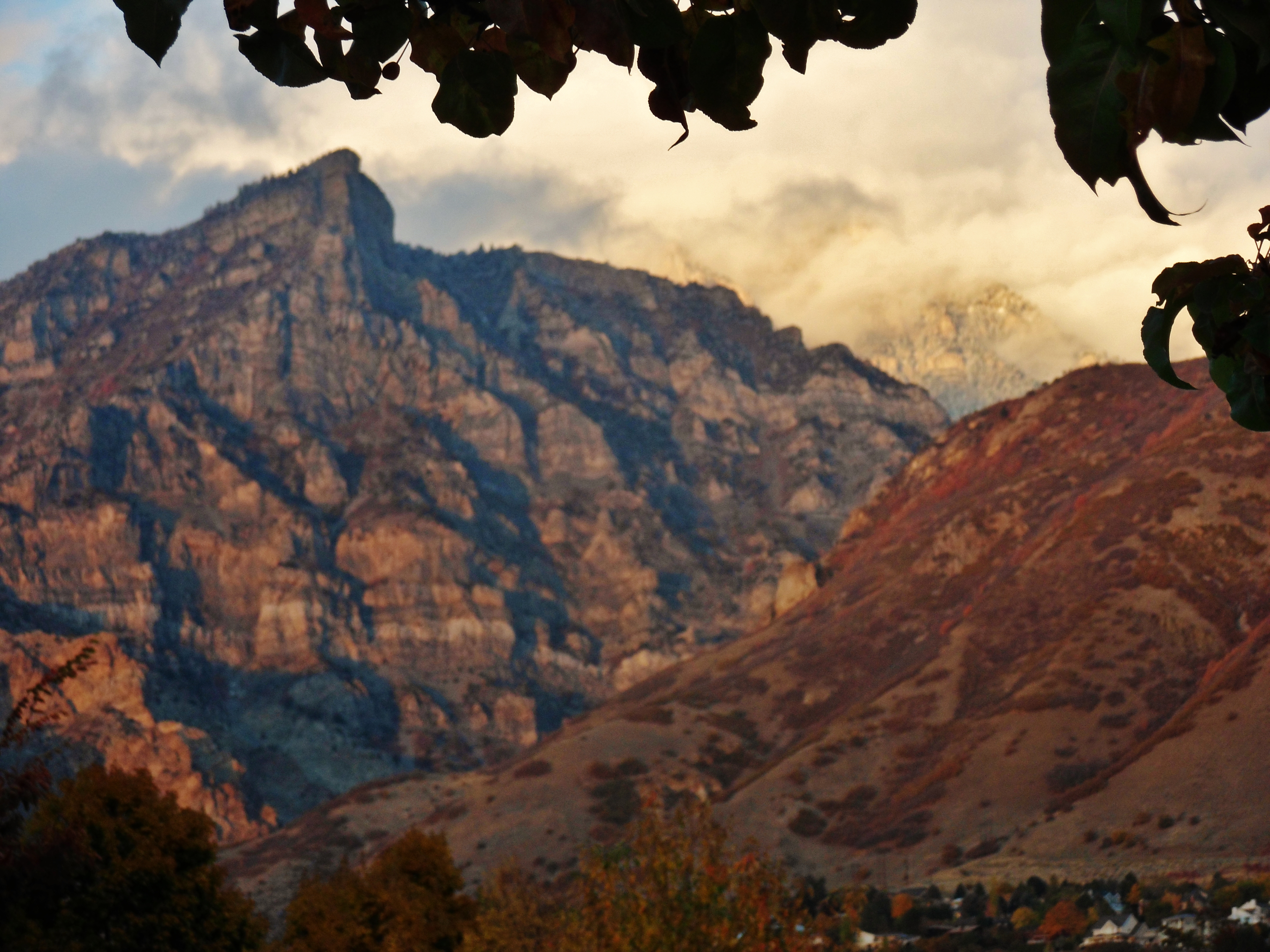
Kyhv Peak. The former name of Squaw Peak was reportedly derived from Big Elk's wife who died in Rock Canyon below the mountain while trying to escape the Mormon militia.

After having received a letter about the poor attitude of the settlers in working with Wells's troops, Brigham Young sent Wells to lead the army with the expanded mission "not to leave the valley until every Indian was out." On February 11, Wells split the army into two. One contingent, under Captain Grant's command, followed the trail of some Timpanogos who had fled up Rock Canyon; Black Hawk helped the militia to track the fleeing Timpanogos. They set up camp at the mouth of the canyon, where they took 23 prisoners and found about a dozen dead bodies, including the body of Pareyarts. Further up the canyon, they found more tepees and killed more Timpanogos and took more prisoners. Some of the prisoners were later executed. Ope-carry, Patsowet, and their families: six women and seven children, managed to flee over the mountains using snowshoes they made in the canyon. According to Edward Tullidge, Pareyarts's wife was found dead in Rock Canyon. One account says that one of the Timpanogos women killed herself by falling from a precipice. It is possible that the woman was Pareyarts's wife, and local legends say that Squaw Peak was named for her.

The other contingent, led by Wells, divided into smaller parties and searched the southern valley for Timpanogos to kill. They first attacked a village along the Spanish Fork River, and then a village on Peteetneet Creek. On February 13, 15–20 Timpanogos families surrendered to Captain Grant in modern-day Lake Shore, Utah. Wells wrote a letter to Brigham Young asking what he should do. On February 14, Brigham Young wrote a letter instructing Wells to kill them if they did not surrender. Lieutenant Gunnison of the Stansbury Expedition reported that the Mormons promised to be friendly to the Timpanogos men. They held them prisoner overnight; but then in the morning lined up the Timpanogos men to be executed in front of their families. Some attempted to flee across the frozen lake, but the Mormons ran after them on horseback and shot them. At least eleven Timpanogos men were killed; one account reports as many as twenty. The family members were then taken captive.

Later in the day on February 14, the Nauvoo Legion spotted five more Timpanogos men on horseback, and killed three of them. On February 15, they killed three more Timpanogos men on the Peteetneet river, probably members of Chief Peteetneet's tribe. On February 17, they killed another Timpanogos person in Rock Canyon. In total, one militia man and an estimated 102 Timpanogos were killed.

== Aftermath ==
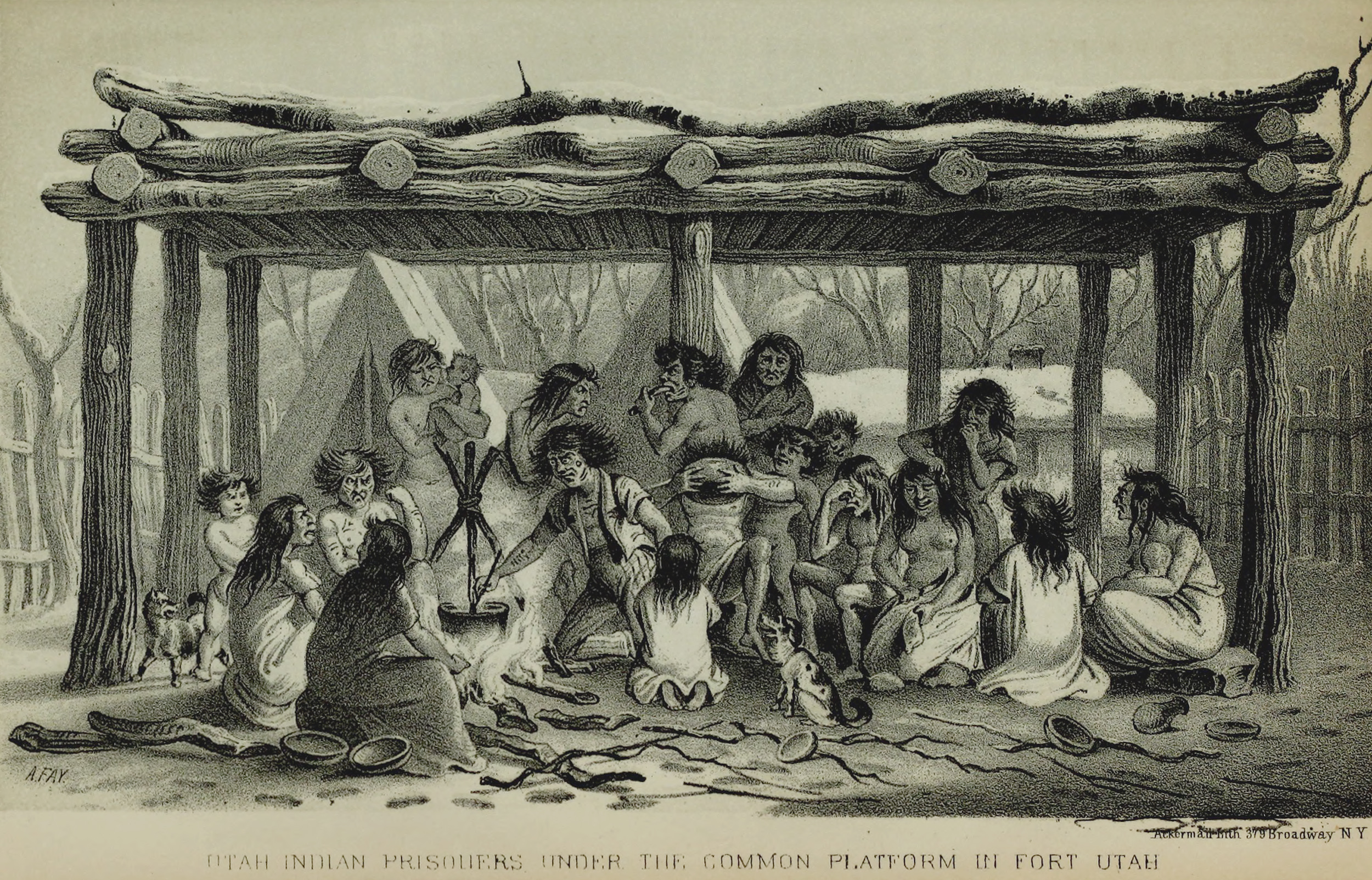
A White artist's caricatured depiction of the prisoners at Fort Utah under the cannon platform

A government surgeon, James Blake, went to the execution site and cut off the Timpanogos' heads for later examination. Captain Howard Stansbury wanted the heads for "future scientific study" and planned to take them to Washington. Around 50 decapitated Timpanogos heads were gathered. They were supposed to be shipped to Salt Lake, but they were held up to be displayed in front of the prisoners at Fort Utah as a warning. The prisoners, including those who sought shelter in the fort before the war, were left in the cold under the fort's cannon, some of whom were dying from exposure. William Potter, who was upset at the condition, petitioned for blankets for the prisoners, which were eventually given. More than forty prisoners, mostly women and children, were taken and placed with Mormon families "as servants" in Salt Lake City "for the purpose of weaning them from their savage pursuits, and bringing them up in the habits of civilized and Christian life". It did not go as planned, as many died and most escaped to live with other Ute bands, especially in the spring. News of the enslavement reached the US Government, and became one of the first priorities of Edward Cooper after he was appointed as Indian Agent of Utah later that year.

Chief Peteetneet, Chief Tabby-To-Kwanah and Chief Grospean discovered the decapitated bodies and asked Fort Utah about the bodies. Patsowet returned to the Salt Lake area and killed livestock belonging to Mormons in retaliation for the violence done to his tribe and threatened to kill Walkara's animals. Patsowet was then arrested and put on trial for the murder of the Mormon militiaman killed at Fort Utah. Patsowet was convicted and executed.

== Legacy ==
Utah Lake had been a meeting place central to Ute culture, but after the battle, permanent Indian occupation of Utah valley was prevented. Resentment by the Indians over the incident towards the Latter-day Saints became intense in the years following and was a factor contributing to Wakara's War that took place from 1853-1854.

In June 1865 Brigham Young and the Indian superintendent, O. H. Irish, met at the mouth of the Spanish Fork River with the leaders of the Utes, Kanosh, San Pitch, and Soweitte, in an effort to force the Indians to relinquish any right to the land and relocate them away from Latter-day Saint settlements. Brigham Young told them, "If you do not sell your land to the Government, they will take it ... and we shall occupy this valley and the next, and the next, and so on til' we occupy the whole of them." All the leaders except San Pitch eventually signed the treaty. The United States Congress did not ratify the treaty however, leading to death and starvation when promised provisions did not arrive as Utes were forced to winter in Strawberry Valley in 1867 while en-route to what would become the Uintah and Ouray Indian Reservation. By 1869, all Indians in Utah Valley had been removed.

== See also ==
- Aiken massacre
- Battle Creek massacre
- Circleville massacre
- Nephi massacre
