= Warren S. Snow =

American general

Warren Stone Snow
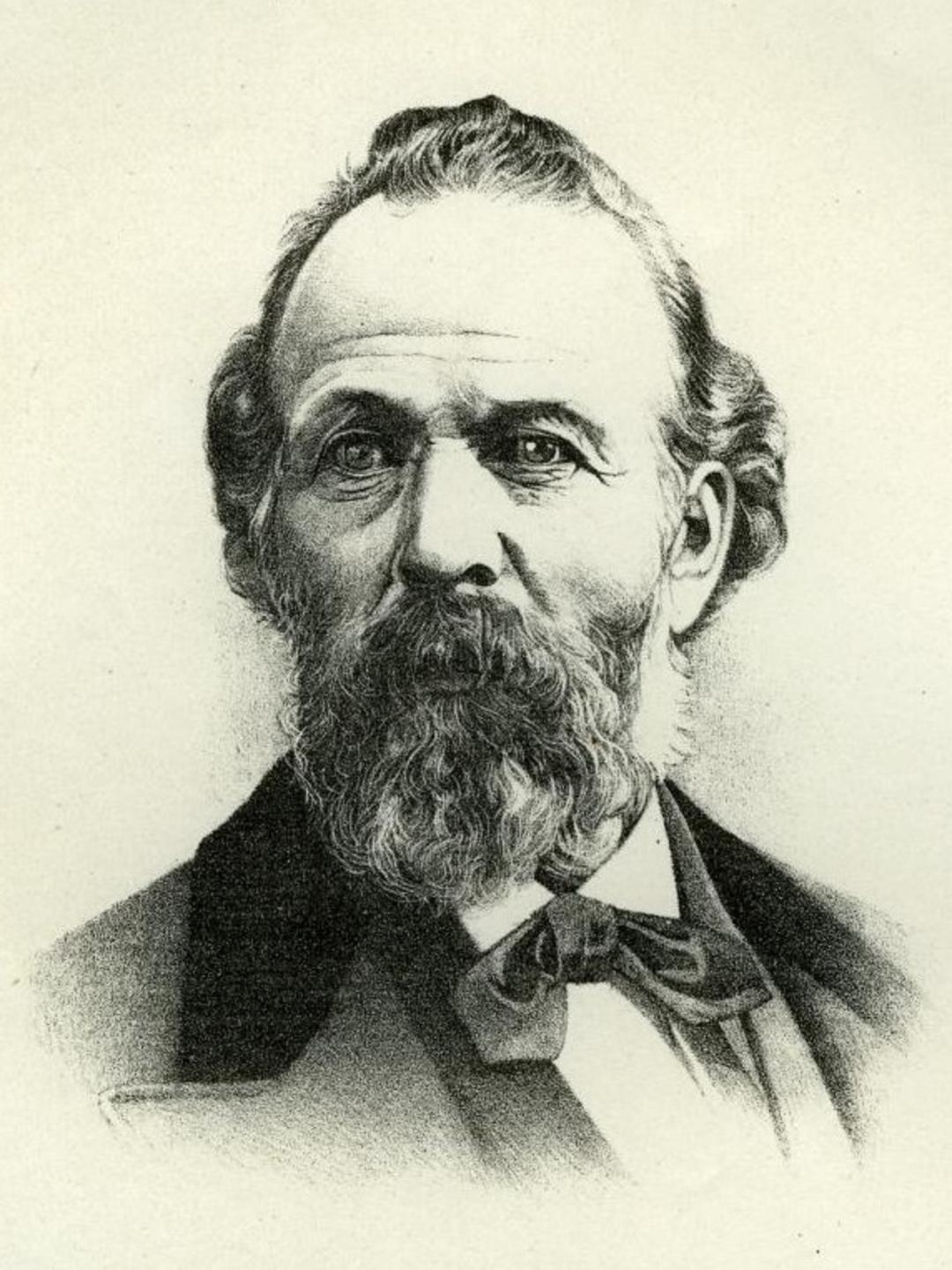
- Born: June 15, 1818; Chesterfield, New Hampshire, United States
- Died: September 21, 1896 (aged 78); Manti, Utah, United States
- Military career
- Allegiance: Utah Territory
- Branch: Utah Territorial Militia
- Service years: 1865–1872
- Rank: Brigadier general
- Unit: Nauvoo Legion
- Conflicts: Black Hawk War

Warren Stone Snow (June 15, 1818 – September 21, 1896) was an American militia general, Mormon Pioneer and missionary who was Captain of the Warren S. Snow company and a main American commander in the Black Hawk War.

== Biography ==
Snow was born on June 15, 1821, as the son of Gardner Snow and Sarah Hastings in Chesterfield, New Hampshire. They moved in 1822 to St. Johnsbury, Vermont and on November 20, 1833, Snow was baptized by Roswell Evans at the age of 15. He later became a Mormon Pioneer as he began migrating westward with the members of the Church and his family as he lived in Kirtland, Ohio for two years and later moved again to Adam-ondi-Ahman in 1838 and finally in late 1839, moved to Illinois.

In 1841 he was married to Mary Ann Voorhees in Lima Township, Adams County and had seven children. He was soon endowed in the Nauvoo Temple along with his wife on January 6, 1846. Snow and his family then moved to Pottawattamie County, Iowa and began moving even further westwards and arrived to the Utah Territory in 1852 and moved to Manti and soon became Bishop of the town. He would then oversee all settlements within Sanpete County. Snow then married his second wife, Sarah Elizabeth Whiting in April 1857 and had two more children. Later that year, he was elected to a two-year term on the Territorial Council, the upper house of the Utah territorial legislature. In 1861, Snow was called for a mission to England and later returned in 1864 being captain of the emigrates of the mission.

Snow was then called to assist the Mormon settlers in the Black Hawk War as a band of settlers commanded by Reddick Allred were repulsed and Snow was called to take over during the emergency. Too afraid to go back to the canyon to retrieve the bodies, Snow persuaded Sanpitch, a Sanpete Valley Chief to scout Salina Canyon for them so the settlers could retrieve the bodies of the two young men. When Sanpitch returned with word that Black Hawk had gone over the pass into Castle Valley, the Legion returned to the canyon and brought back the dead: Jens Sorenson who had been terribly mutilated, and William Kearnes, the son of the Mormon bishop of Gunnison, who had been carefully protected. They also came back convinced that Sanpitch had met with Black Hawk and sent him over the pass, implying that Chief Sanpitch was the architect of the whole affair. On July 15, Colonel Warren S. Snow was promoted to Brigadier General and was the main commander of the Mormon militia and minutemen. The war would later be in favor of the Mormons as the Native Americans surrendered in 1872. Snow later died on September 21, 1896, in Manti and was buried in Manti Cemetery.
