= Peteetneet Creek =

Stream in Utah County, Utah

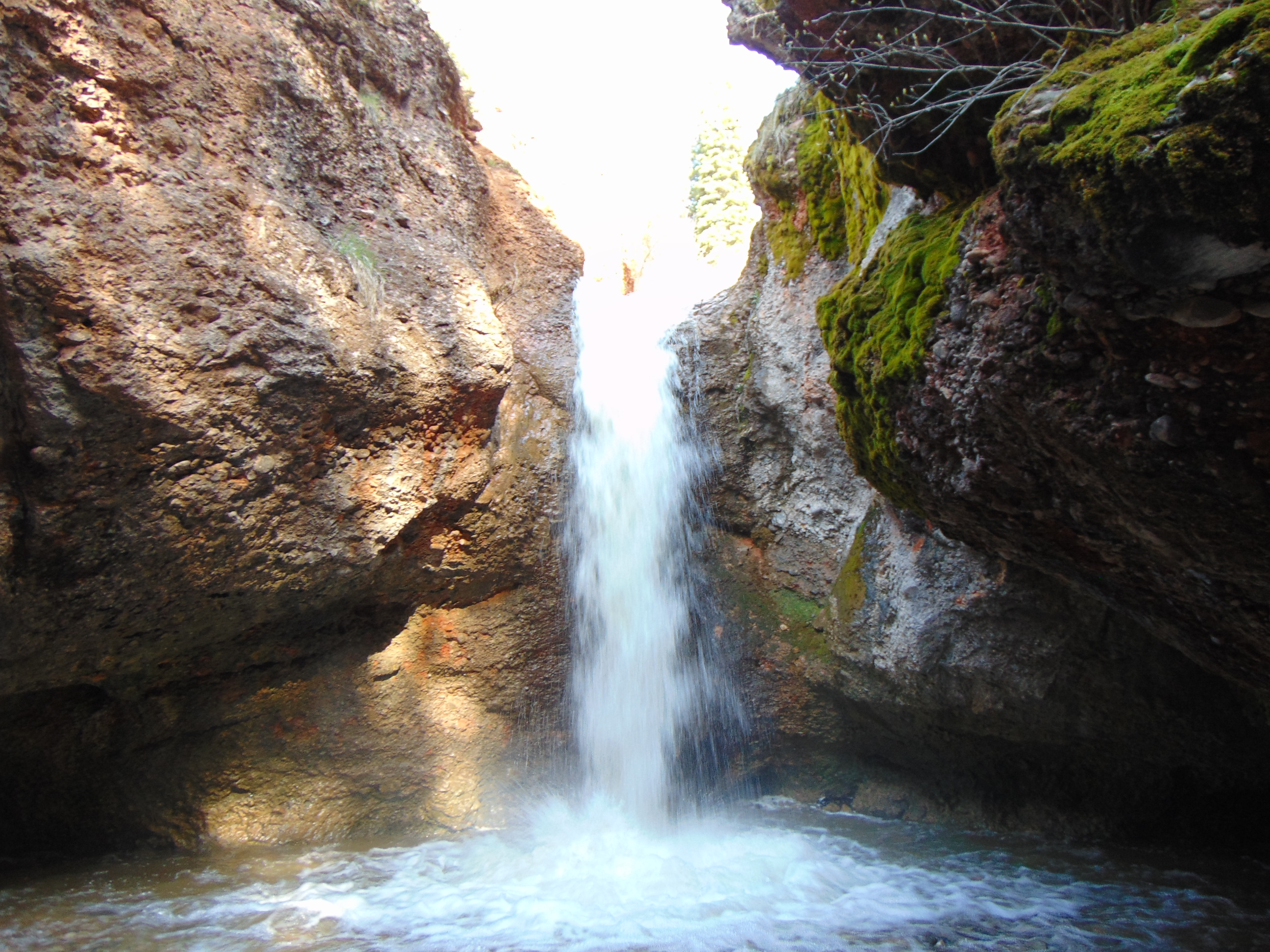
The Grotto Falls, just below the source of the Peteetneet Creek in Payson Canyon, May 2016

Peteetneet Creek is a stream in Payson Canyon, south of Payson, Utah, United States.

== Description ==
The creek was named after the Timpanogos Chief Peteetneet who lived near it. Its source is located at 39°56′52″N 111°40′37″W, the confluence of Shram Creek and an unnamed creek that flows through the Frank Young Canyon. Rather than flow north into Utah Lake, the creek ends shortly after entering Payson (just south of the intersection of South 300 East and East 600 South). However, older maps indicate that it previously ran a bit further north to the north side of East 200 South (north of the Memorial Park).

== History ==
Peteetneet Creek was a good camping spot on the Mormon Road, a Mormon pioneer and 49er wagon route between Salt Lake City, Utah and Los Angeles, California. The Latter-day Saints first settled in Payson in 1850. After improvements were made to the Mormon Road wagon route in 1855, it had become what was known as the Los Angeles - Salt Lake Road. This was a wagon freight route used each year from late fall through winter into early spring, between Southern California and Utah, isolated by the winter snows in the Sierra Nevada Mountains from San Francisco and by the Rocky Mountains from the rest of the United States to the east. This route remained the only winter season route to the outside world until the railroad arrived in Utah in the late 1860s.

== See also ==
- List of rivers of Utah
