= Fort Utah =

Settlement in Utah, United States

Coordinates: 40.2379°N 111.6889°W

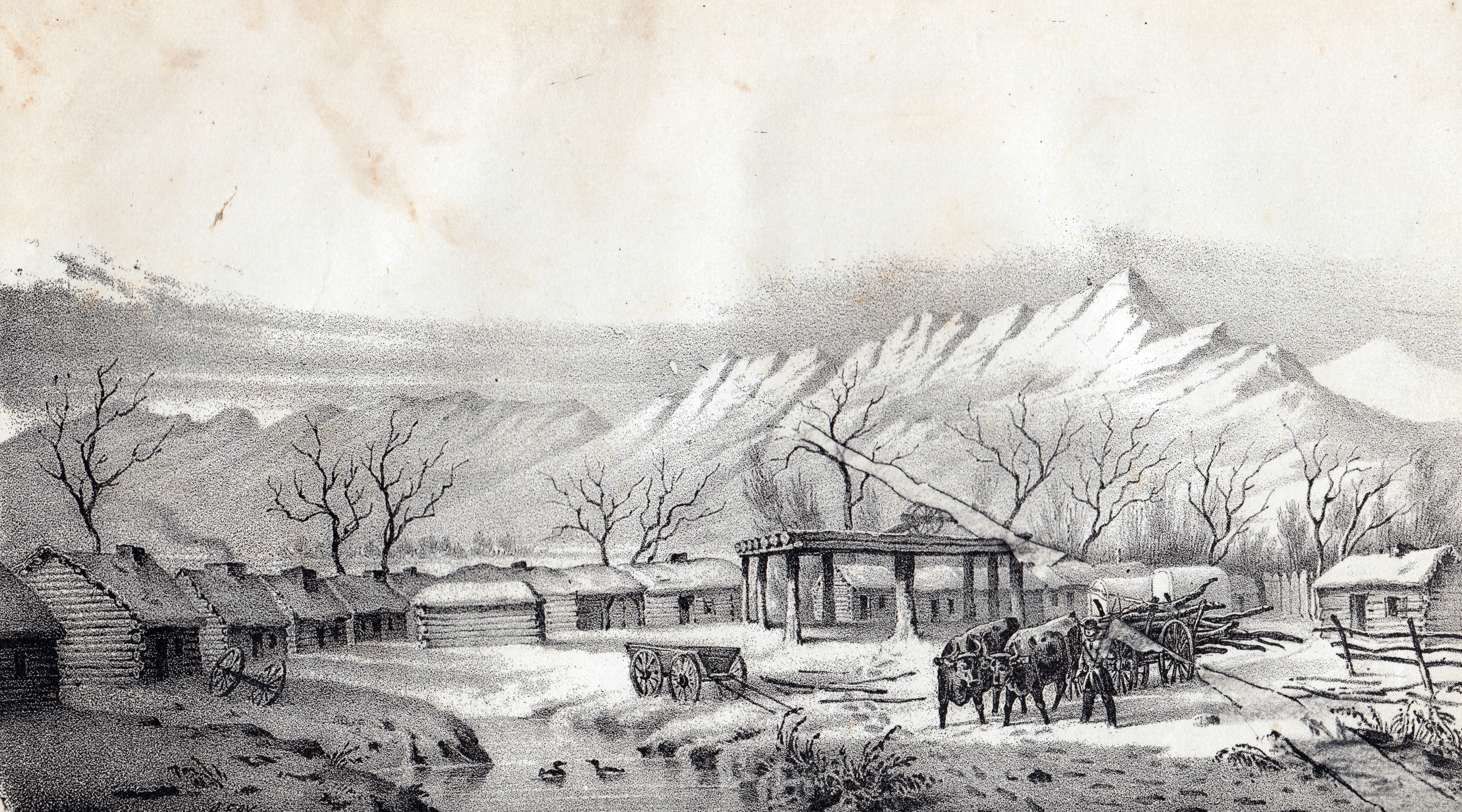
Fort Utah on the Timpanogas (Provo River) River, 1850

Fort Utah (also known as Fort Provo) was the original European American settlement at modern-day Provo, Utah, United States. The settlement was established March 12, 1849 by President John S. Higbee with approximately 150 persons sent from Salt Lake City to Provo by President Brigham Young.

Located west of present-day downtown Provo, the fort consisted of several log dwellings, surrounded by a 14-foot (4.3 m) palisade 20 by 40 rods in size (330 by 660 feet [100 by 200 m]), with gates in the east and west ends, and a middle deck, for a cannon. Following flooding, the settlement was moved to the current location of Provo's North Park in 1850.

== Battle at Fort Utah ==
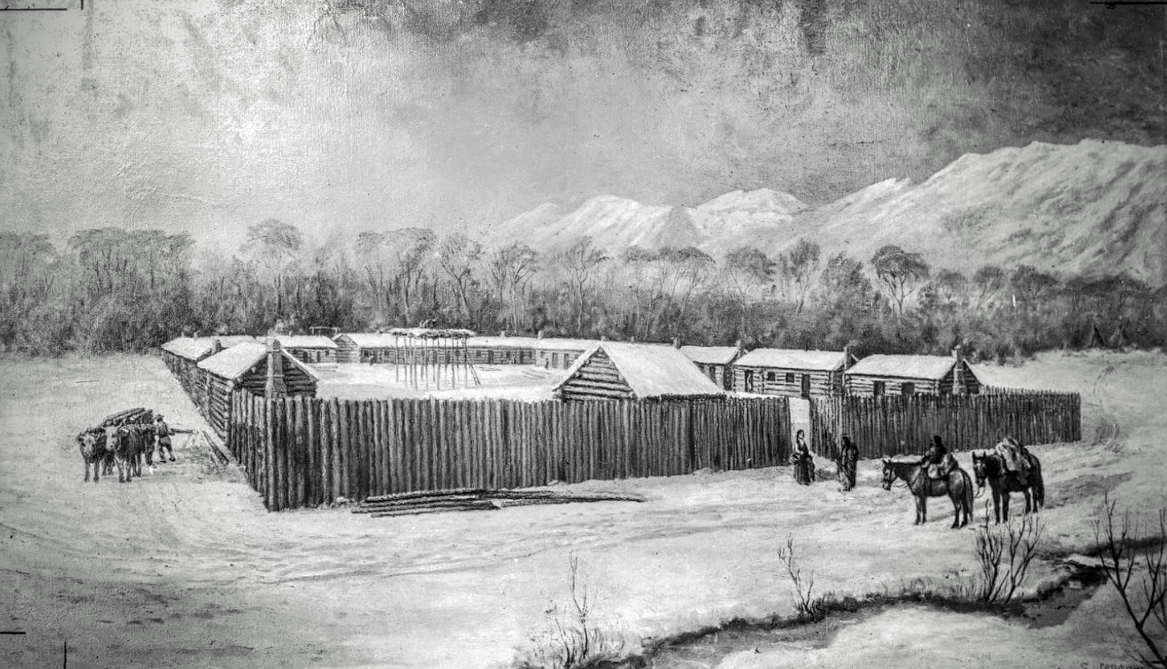
Fort Utah in 1849

In late 1849, tensions between the Ute people and members of the Church of Jesus Christ of Latter-day Saints in Utah Valley escalated after a Church member killed a Ute known as Old Bishop, whom he accused of stealing his shirt. The Mormon and two associates then hid the victim's body in the Provo River. Details of the murder were likely withheld, at least initially, from Brigham Young and other Church leaders. Settlers at Fort Utah did, however, report other difficulties with the Indians, including the firing of weapons at settlers and the theft of livestock and crops. Brigham Young counseled patience, telling them to "stockade your fort, to attend to your own affairs and let the Indians take care of theirs." Tensions mounted at Fort Utah after the Utes demanded that the settlers turn over the murderers because the settlers refused to turn over those involved in the murder of Old Bishop to the Utes or to pay reparations for his death. In the winter of 1849–1850, a measles epidemic spread from the Mormon settlers to the Ute camps, killing many Indians and heightening tensions. At a council of ecclesiastical leaders in Salt Lake City on January 31, 1850, the leader of Fort Utah reported that the Utes' actions and intentions were growing increasingly aggressive: "they say they mean to hunt our Cattle. & go & get the other Indians to kill us." In response, Brigham Young authorized a campaign against the Utes telling them to kill all the men and take the women and children captive. On February 8, 1850, a militia from Salt Lake surrounded a group of around seventy people at Big Elk. After two days of fighting, the Utes surrendered. The army killed the men and sent the women and children up to Salt Lake as prisoners. A series of battles in February 1850 resulted in the deaths of dozens of Utes and one Mormon. These events contributed to the Walker War.

== Monuments and replica ==
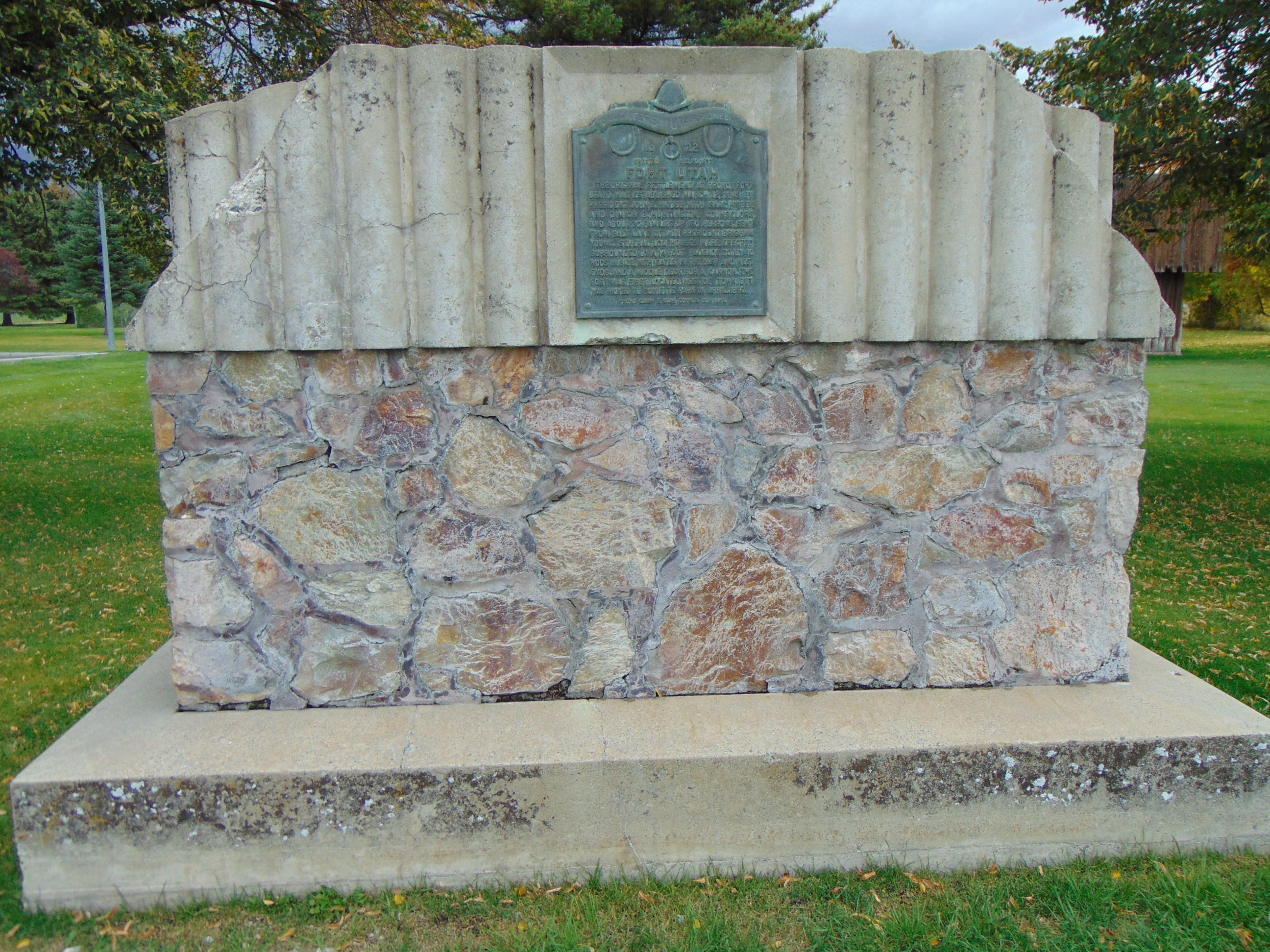
1937 Monument built by the Daughters of Utah Pioneers

On August 30, 1937, a monument to commemorate the fort was dedicated at what was believed to be the original site of the 1849 structure. The monument was erected by the Daughters of Utah Pioneers with assistance from the Sons of Utah Pioneers. Constructed with a concrete base and a center section of native stone, the monument was topped with cement molded into a fluted shape meant to reflect the fort's architecture. Also included in the monument's construction was a metal plaque with a history of the fort.

Decades later, Provo City purchased the property surrounding the monument and with the help of the Utah Lake Lions Club began to develop a public park on the land, known as "Fort Utah Park." A miniature replica of the 1849 fort was included as part of the park's initial construction. The replica included log construction, embrasures, a cannon situated on a raised center platform, and two block houses in opposite corners of the structure. The replica was completed in August 1972, in time to host that year's annual encampment of the Sons of Utah Pioneers. Citing safety issues and lack of historical accuracy in the replica, the structure was demolished by Provo City in early 2017.

In the late 1990s, a committee tasked with researching the original 1849 structure in preparation for Provo's sesquicentennial celebration determined that the location of the 1937 monument and 1972 fort replica was not at the actual location of the 1849 fort. Rather it was determined that the site of the fort was near where Interstate 15 crosses the Provo River, and that the freeway or a nearby mobile home park, was likely built directly over the location. Subsequently, in 1999 the Provo Sesquicentennial Committee dedicated a new monument just east of Interstate 15 along the Provo River Parkway Trail. This new monument is meant to commemorate Fort Utah at a location closer to the site of the 1849 structure.

The site of the 1850 fort is located at Provo's North Park, formerly known as Sowiette Park.
