= Sapiah =

Native American leader (1840–1936)

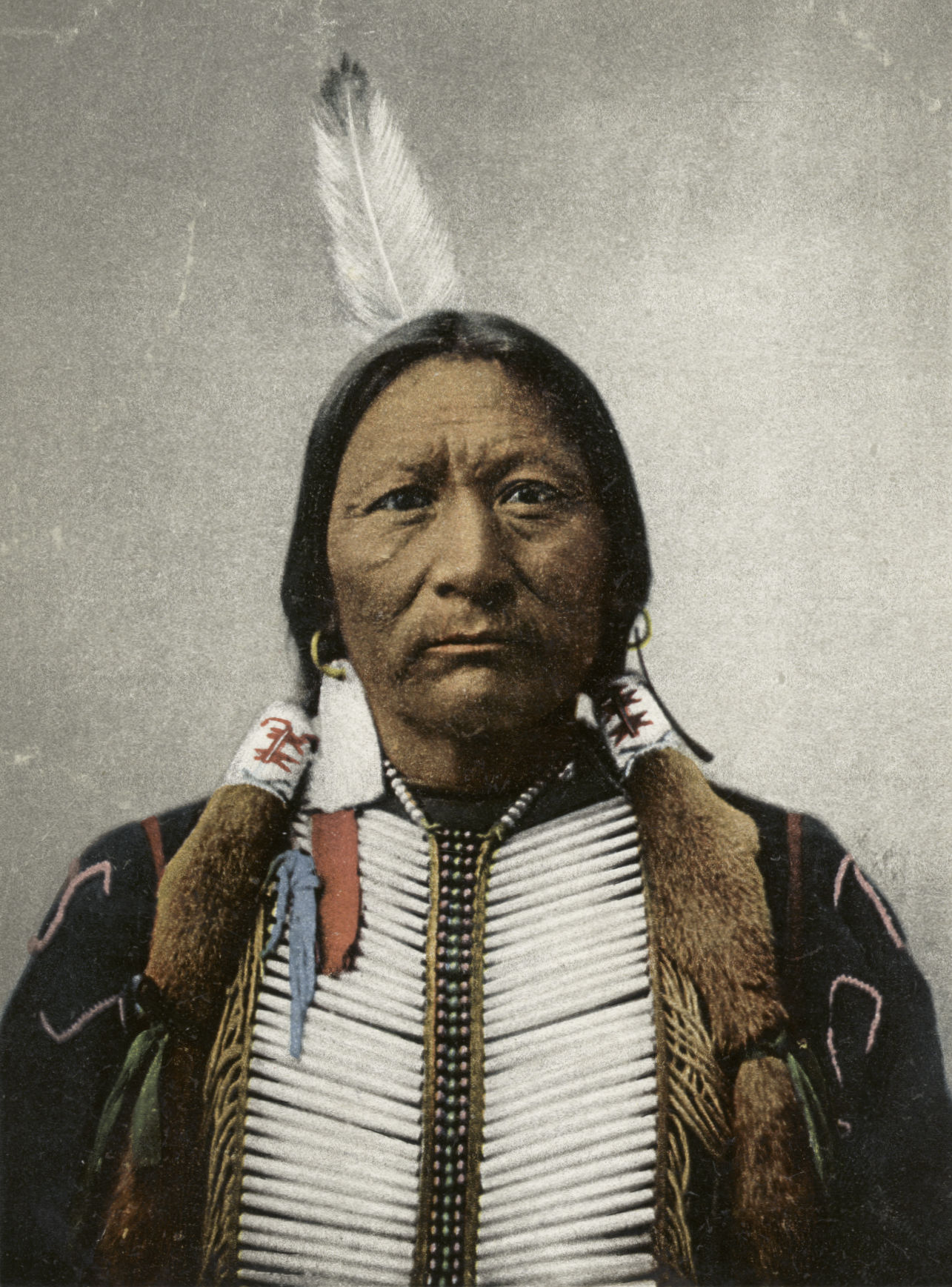
- Sapiah "Buckskin Charlie", Ute chief, after 1898
- Born: 1840; Possibly near Tierra Amarilla, New Mexico
- Died: May 8, 1936 (aged 95–96)
- Other names: Buckskin Charley; Charles Buck; Charles Buckskin
- Spouses: Sarah (Ute: Pah-Ho-SE), married before 1885 and likely died by 1909; Emma Naylor Buck (Ute: Te-Wee or To-Wee), married by 1910 and was alive, but paralyzed from a stroke, when Sapiah died
- Children: Son Julian, born about 1872; Daughter Frances (Ute: Tri-ni-dad), born about 1876; Son Antonio (Ute: San-An-Tonio), born about 1878
- Parent(s): An Apache mother and a Muache Ute father

Sapiah (his Ute name), is also commonly known as Charles Buck and Buckskin Charley (also spelled Buckskin Charlie; 1840–May 8, 1936), (Note: Sapiah was the leader's Ute birth name. He was known as Charles Buck in census and military records and he was identified as Charlie Buckskin and Buckskin Charley in newspaper articles about his death.) was the leader of the Southern Ute tribe from about 1870 until his death in 1936. He led a group of Utes to rescue women and children from the White River Agency during the Meeker Massacre (1879) that resulted in the deaths of Nathan Meeker and his soldiers. The northern band of Utes were forced out of Colorado after the massacre.

In 1880, Chief Ouray died, and Sapiah and other Ute chiefs negotiated for treaties with the United States government. Sapiah met five or more presidents in Washington, D.C., including Benjamin Harrison who awarded him the Rutherford B. Hayes Indian Peace Medal and Theodore Roosevelt. He attended Roosevelt's inaugural parade. Sapiah sought to coexist with white people in peace. He fought for children's education on the reservation and was opposed to sending children away from their families to American Indian boarding schools.

The government was pressured to remove all Utes from Colorado after the Meeker and Beaver Creek Massacres (1885). But in and after 1894, the government established two reservations in Southern Colorado under federal law: the Ute Mountain Ute Reservation and the Southern Ute Indian Reservation. Sapiah was a farmer and rancher on his allotted 160-acres of land.

== Personal life ==
Sapiah was born around 1840 in Colorado or New Mexico. (Note: He was reportedly born near Colorado Springs, Colorado, according to Ute records. Historians are split on his place of birth, either near Ignacio, Colorado or in New Mexico near Tierra Amarilla.) His parents were an Apache mother and a Muache Ute father. During his childhood, Ute's traditional land spanned most of what is now the state of Colorado. Utes lived and traveled in bands, and they fought Comanches, Navajo, and Apaches to protect their land.

Then, white people immigrated into the area to prospect for precious metals and to farm the land, and over time Utes were pushed off of their land. The Tabeguache band was led by Ouray, who came to be seen as the leader of all the Utes.

== Marriages and children ==
Sapiah was married by 1885 to Sarah (Ute: Pah-Ho-SE), born about 1855. The couple had three children:

- Julian, born about 1872
- Frances (also known as Trinidad), born about 1876
- Antonio or San Antonio, born about 1878

The Bucks were members of the Southern Utes at the Southern Ute Reservation. Their son Julian had a wife and at least one child. (Note: Julian and Antonio were said to be sons of Emma, with no mention of Frances, but the census records state Julian's, Frances', and Antonio's mother is Sarah. Sapiah did not marry Emma until 1909 or 1910, about 38 years after the birth of Julian, his oldest child.) Julian died before his father, who died on May 8, 1936. Julian was last on the 1904 Indian Census with a 14-year-old daughter, Mary. It was the last census that recorded Julian's information. Antonio Buck, the second son, became the first elected chairman of the Southern Ute after his father's death. He was the last of the Southern Ute's hereditary chiefs.

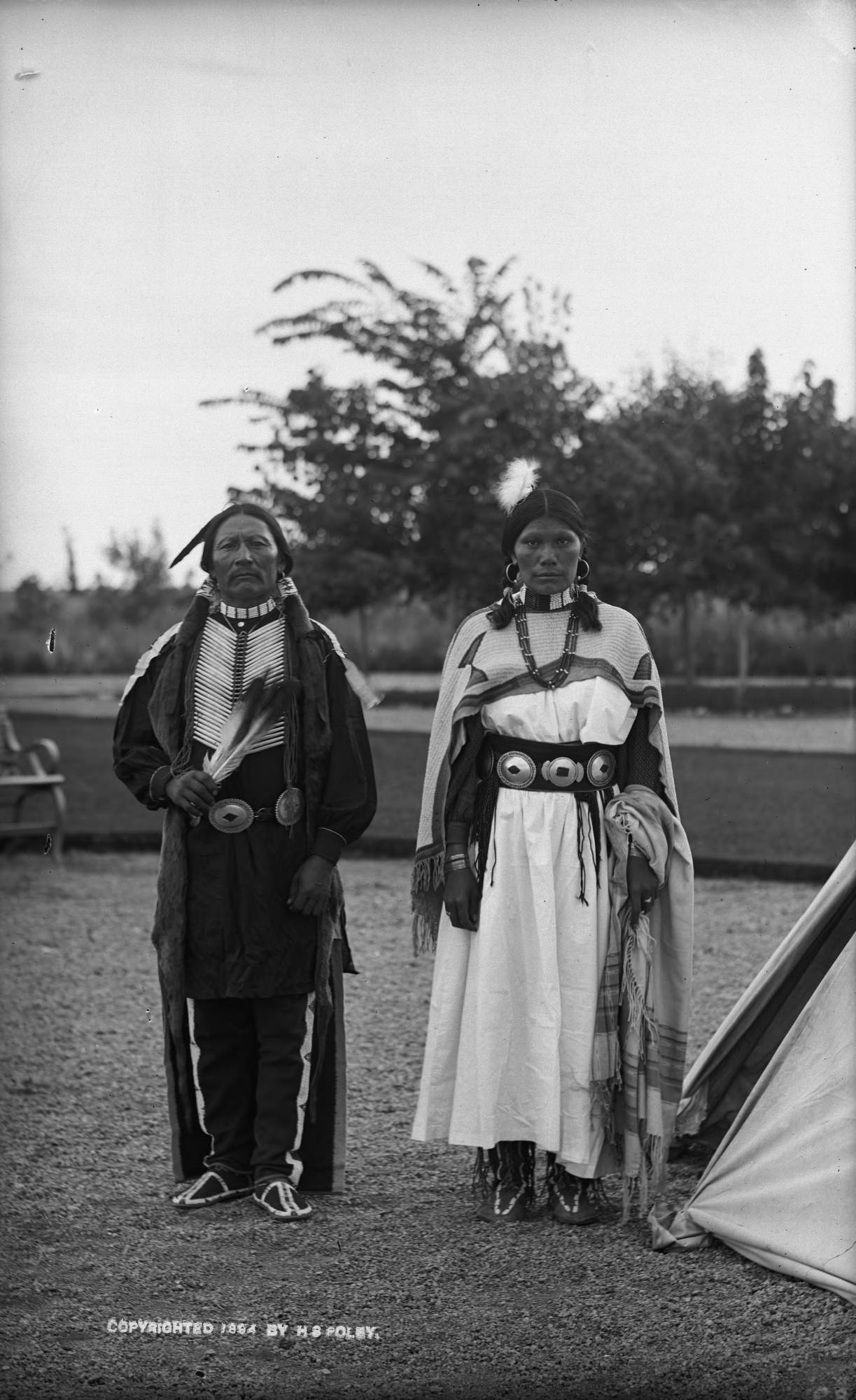
Buckskin Charley and wife Emma Naylor Buck (Ute To-wee), taken by Horace Swartley Poley

Sarah last appears on the Indian Census Rolls in 1904. In 1909, Sapiah lived alone, and he was married that year or in 1910 to Emma Naylor Buck (Ute: Te-Wee or To-Wee).

Sapiah and Emma worshiped with the Native American Church, also known as the Peyote Religion, and participated in the ceremonial Sun Dance. Sapiah and Sarah's son Julian worshipped the Presbyterian faith and facilitated the establishment of a mission school run by Rev. A. J. Rodríguez near the Ignacio Agency (Southern Ute Indian Reservation).

== Indian scout and policeman ==
External image
- Buckskin Charley, Indian Police, 1880

Known as Charles Buck, Sapiah served as an Indian scout with the United States Army during the American Civil War. He was the chief of police at the Pine River Agency and was a private of the Indian police of the Southern Ute Agency in 1897.

== Leader ==
=== Leader of a Muache band ===
Before 1868, Saphia led a Muache band, ranging over northern New Mexico with the Abiquiú and Tierra Amarilla Indian Agencies, and later over eastern New Mexico. In 1868, when Ouray was the principal chief of the Utes, a treaty was enacted between the Utes and the government that provided land for a reservation in Western Colorado. Other treaties reduced the size of the reservation as more miners and prospectors settled in the area, and Utes from New Mexico were forced to move to Colorado. Ouray designated him the chief of the Muache band of Utes about 1870.

=== Meeker Massacre ===
White River Utes killed Nathan Meeker and his soldiers at the White River Agency during the Meeker Massacre (September 29, 1879). Sapiah led a group of Utes to the agency to rescue women and children and was later called the "Hero of Meeker Massacre". The United States government forced the northern bands of the Utes out of Colorado.

=== Chief ===
Sapiah was a chief of the Southern Ute people. He became more influential after Chief Ouray died in 1880. Sapiah promoted "peace and progress" and taught Utes "the white man's way." He learned English and Spanish.

He wanted to coexist with whites, as did Chief Severo of the Capote Utes. He advocated for the education of children on the reservation, and he was troubled by the isolation of Ute children from their parents and indoctrination of the white language and culture at American Indian boarding schools in Colorado and New Mexico. Children were subject to unsanitary conditions and made to give up their culture and language. Many children, including three of Chief Ignacio's children, died at the boarding schools. Sapiah became the leading chief of the Southern Utes after Severo died in 1913.

=== Treaty negotiator ===
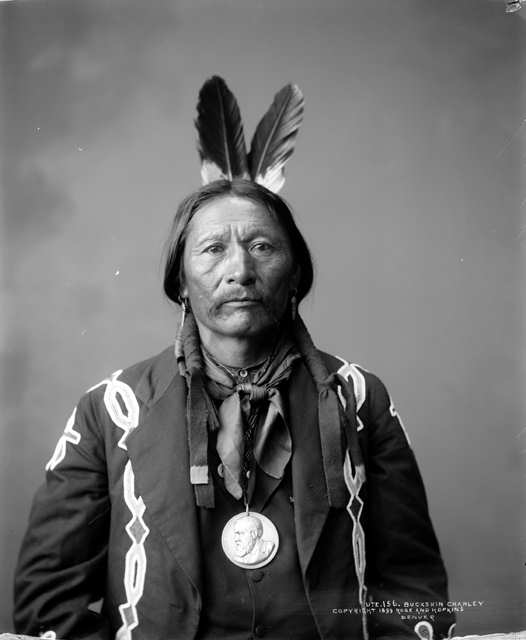
Sapiah "Buckskin Charley", wearing his Indian Peace Medal

After the Beaver Creek Massacre (1885), the government was pressured to remove all Utes from Colorado. In 1886, Sapiah traveled to Washington, D.C. with Chief Ignacio, Chief Tapuche of the Capote Utes, and Indian agent C.F. Stollsteimer at Ignacio of the Southern Ute Indian Reservation. They agreed to relocate from Colorado to southeastern Utah, but the treaty was never ratified, so most of the Southern Utes remained on the Southern Ute Indian Reservation.

Land for the Utes was divided up by the government in and after 1894 under federal law. The Weeminuche Utes, led by Chief Ignacio, were assigned the Ute Mountain Ute Reservation, and the land was shared by members of the band. The eastern part of the reservation officially became the Southern Ute Indian Reservation and was divided up amongst Muache and Capote tribal members in 80- and 160-acre parcels.

Sapiah met five or seven United States presidents in Washington, D.C., including Benjamin Harrison (1889–1893) and, with his son Antonio, Theodore Roosevelt (1901–1909). He attended Theodore Roosevelt's 1905 Inaugural Parade and rode with Geronimo.

In 1890, he was given the Rutherford B. Hayes Indian Peace Medal by President Benjamin Harrison.

=== Rancher and farmer ===
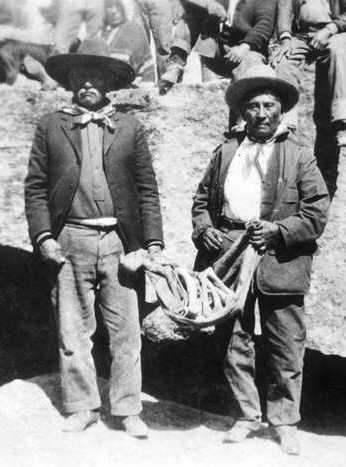
Buckskin Charlie and John McCook at the reburial of Ouray, Ignacio, Colorado, 1925, Colorado State Archives

Sapiah established a sheep and cattle ranch and farm on his allotted 160 acres. He was successful, in part due to financial incentives given to leaders by the government until the early 20th century.

== Later years and death ==
Sapiah led a group of men to the secret burial place of Chief Ouray's remains, dug them up, and reburied them at the Ouray Memorial Cemetery in 1925.

Sapiah died at the age of 96 on May 8, 1936. By the time of his death, a stroke had paralyzed Emma. He was buried next to the grave of Ouray in Ignacio, Colorado. Sapiah and three other Ute chiefs—Ouray, Severo, and Ignacio—were honored on the Ute Chieftains Memorial Monument on September 24, 1939.

== Sources ==
- Clark, H. Jackson (1993). The owl in Monument Canyon, and other stories from Indian country. Salt Lake City: University of Utah Press. ISBN 978-0-87480-439-3.
