= Josephine Meeker =

American teacher and physician

- Photograph of Josephine Meeker
- Born: January 28, 1857; Ohio, US
- Died: December 20, 1882 (aged 25); Colorado, US
- Occupations: Teacher, physician, secretary
- Known for: Captive of the Ute tribe following the Meeker Massacre
- Parent(s): Nathan Meeker; Arvilla Delight Smith

Josephine Meeker (January 28, 1857 – December 20, 1882) was a teacher and medical doctor at the White River Indian Agency in Colorado Territory, where her father Nathan Meeker was the United States (US) agent. On September 29, 1879, he and 10 of his male employees were killed in a Ute attack, in what became known as the Meeker Massacre. Josephine, her mother Arvilla Meeker, and Mrs. Shadruck Price and her two children were taken captive and held hostage by the Ute tribe for 23 days.

Following the rescue of the hostages, Meeker recounted her experiences at a public hearing. General Charles Adams, of the Colorado Militia that arranged the captives' release, conducted an official investigation of the incident. Josephine Meeker's testimony provides keen insight into the experiences a white woman underwent as an Indian captive. She was the last celebrated white captive of Native Americans. Working for some time in Washington, D.C., and then for Senator Henry Moore Teller in Colorado, Meeker died young at age 25 of a pulmonary infection.

== Early life and education ==
Born in Ohio, Josephine Meeker was the youngest of the five children of Nathan Cook Meeker and Arvilla Delight Smith. She had two brothers, Ralph and George, and two sisters, Rozene and Mary. In 1870, at the age of 13, she moved with her family to the Union Colony in Greeley, Colorado, a utopian agricultural settlement which her father had founded. Shortly after their arrival, her brother George died of tuberculosis. In her youth she was considered "a bit of a tomboy". Riding astride rather than using the side-saddle recommended for women, she was said to challenge boys to horse races in the road. After high school, Meeker returned to Ohio to complete her education at Oberlin College.

After graduation, Meeker returned to Colorado and the White River Indian Agency, where her father had been appointed US Indian agent. Meeker wanted to improve the conditions of the Utes. In July 1878, she was described as having been intelligent, tall, and slender with shoulder-length dark blonde hair. Assisting her father, she was listed on the agency rolls as a teacher and physician, earning $750 (~$25,022 in 2025) a year. Meeker established a school for the Ute children.

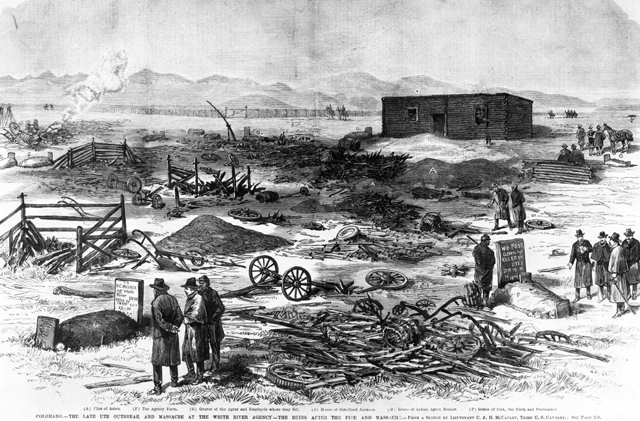
Etching which depicts the aftermath of the Meeker Massacre, when women and children were taken captive by Ute Indians. Her father's grave is shown in the lower left corner.

== Ute uprising and Meeker Massacre ==
Nathan Meeker was trying to convert the Ute to farming and Christianity, both of which they resisted. They were dependent on horses, hunting game, and nomadism. White settlers had been encroaching on Ute lands for decades, and the Utes' resentment grew as the game declined. When Meeker plowed up one of the Utes' horse race tracks, he quarreled with a Ute. Meeker sent a request to Rawlins, Wyoming, asking for soldiers to guard the agency. On September 21, 1879, Major Thomas Thornburg left Fort Steele with 190 men.

On September 29, the Utes learned of the approaching army and ambushed Major Thornburg and his men at Milk Creek, killing 13 men, including Thornburg and all the officers above the rank of captain; another 25 were wounded. A man got out to go for reinforcements; the survivors barricaded themselves behind their dead animals and wagons and held out until October 8, when help arrived. The Utes then attacked the agency, killing Nathan Meeker and 10 of his employees. They took as captives and hostages Josephine and her mother, along with Mrs. Shaduck Price and two of her children. The Utes held the captives at a remote mountain camp.

The Ute warrior Persune had taken Josephine as his captive and had to fight with Douglas, another warrior who wanted her. Persune refused to give up Meeker, keeping her with him throughout her captivity. His other wives helped her begin to adapt. Persune and the Utes regarded Josephine as his wife, according to their conventions of captives. According to her later testimony, she was raped by Persune in his tent in the presence of his wives. To pass the time, Meeker made a dress from a blanket given her by the Utes. (The dress is on exhibit in the downtown Greeley History Museum, Colorado.)

One Ute woman, Shawsheen, along with her husband, adamantly advocated for the release of the captives and their safety. Josephine Meeker said of her captivity, "We all owe our lives to the sister of Chief Ouray..."

=== Rescue ===
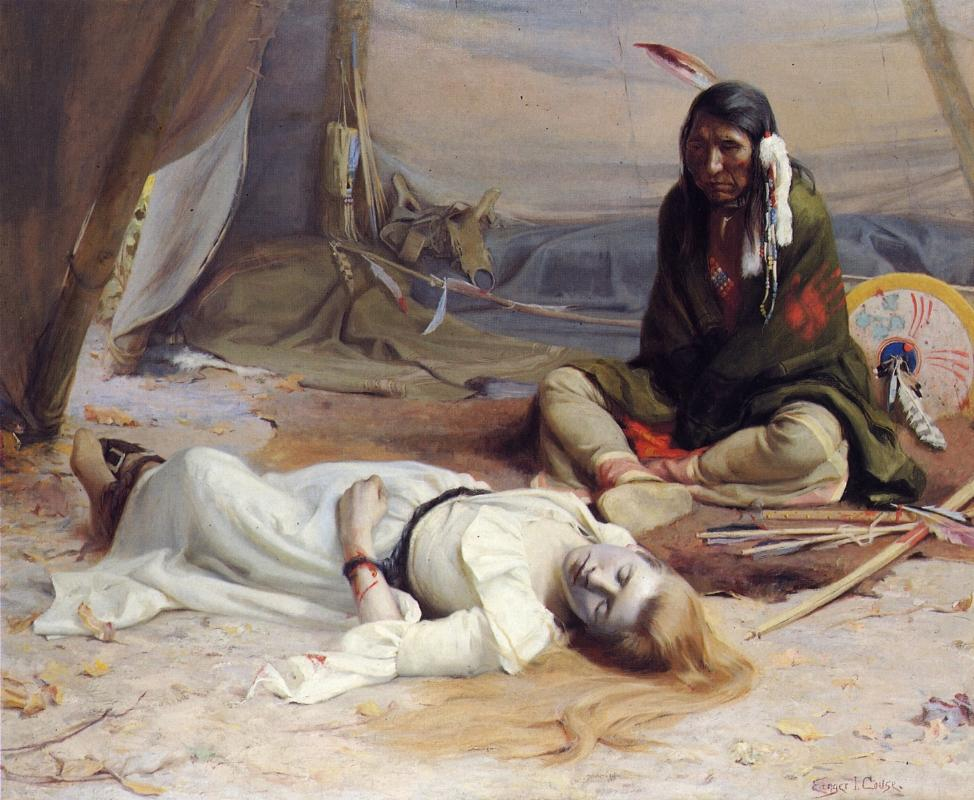
"The Captive" 1891 picture by E. Irving Couse. Alleged either to have been based upon an incident involving a Cayuse Chief Two Crows and an 1847 Whitman Massacre survivor Lorinda Bewly or possibly upon the experience of Josephine Meeker

On October 21, the pioneer women and children were rescued by Charles Adams, a general of the Colorado Militia. He was a longtime friend of Chief Ouray and the Uncompahgre Utes, who were not involved in the Meeker Massacre. Ouray's wife Chipeta was instrumental in obtaining the release of the captives. Adams together with three of his men and some Uncompahgres went to the Utes' camp. When he met Josephine, he shook her hand and told her that he had come to take her back if she would go. The former captives were escorted to Denver where Meeker was interviewed by Dr. Avery, a female physician.

On November 4 at Greeley, General Adams conducted an official investigation into the massacre and the women's captivity. After having been sworn in, Meeker described in intimate detail her relationship with Persune in captivity. In 1880, the US Congress held an inquiry into the massacre, at which Chief Ouray, Chipeta, and General Adams testified at the hearing.

Before Adams took Meeker away from the camp, Persune promised that she would not have to perform any domestic tasks if she would stay with him as his wife. He offered her all his possessions and wept when she rejected him. He was said to continue to love her.

Meeker left Colorado shortly after her rescue and went to work in Washington, D.C. There she worked for a time as a copyist for the Office of Indian Affairs. Returning to Colorado, she became a secretary for US Senator Henry Moore Teller. She often gave lectures about the Utes and her experiences in various eastern cities.

== Death ==
Meeker died on December 20, 1882, at the age of 25 of a pulmonary infection (pneumonia).

The following inscription on her tombstone was written by her mother:

Born Jany 28, 1857 Died December 20, 1882
Brave daughter who with me escaped foul death
while captive in thy noble father slayers' hands
A stealthier foe has filched thy sweet young breath
while lonely here I watch life's failing sands.
