= Shawsheen =

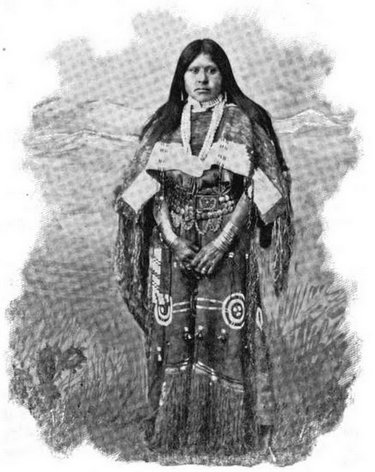
- This is a photograph of Shawsheen, taken at an unknown date. This photo was originally mis-identified as Chipeta.
- Born: c. 1845
- Citizenship: Uncompahgre Ute

Shawsheen (Shoshine) (c. 1845-?) otherwise known as She-towitch, or Susan, was a Native American woman who was a part of the Tabeguache (Uncompahgre) Ute tribe and sister to Chief Ouray. She is known for her capture by the Cheyenne and Arapaho in 1860 or 1861, her protection and care for Arvilla and Josephine Meeker during their captivity, as well as her role within the politics of her tribe as a female leader alongside her sister-in-law, Chipeta.

== Childhood and marriage ==
Shawsheen was born either on the Western Slope of Colorado, or in northern New Mexico and historians believe that she spent most of her childhood in the Uncompahgre Valley. Like many young Ute girls, she would have learned the arts of bead work and weaving in order to trade with other Native Americans and settlers.

Shawsheen was married to Chief Johnson 2, otherwise known as Canalla, a White River Ute. The marriage was arranged by her father, Guero in order to increase relations between the Northern Utes and the Tabeguache Utes. After the marriage, Shawsheen left the Uncompahgre Valley to live on the White River with her new family.

== Capture by the Cheyenne and Arapaho ==
Sometime in 1860 or 1861, while out hunting near the Cache la Podure River on the Eastern Plains of Colorado, Shawsheen and members of her family encountered members of the Cheyenne and Arapaho tribe. During an altercation Shawsheen was taken captive. Her family alerted the United States Cavalry, but troops weren't able to locate her until two years later when soldiers from Camp Collins (now Fort Collins) found her. Historian Brandi Dennison describes the scene: "The cavalry successfully located the raiding party along the Cache la Podure River just as the Cheyenne bound Susan to an unlit pyre." The troops rescued Shawsheen and she was sent to live with Simeon Whitley, a former agent of the Grand River Ute Agency, whom she stayed for a few months before returning home.

Although Sergeant Collier has been credited with leading her rescue, no record of a Sgt. Collier exists in the records of the Colorado Volunteers. However, Sgt. William C. Carroll, nicknamed Bill, whose name was similar enough to be mistakenly remembered as Collier, and who did serve at Camp Collins was publicly and extensively credited in 1879. According to Carroll her rescue took place in May 1863. His interviewer George West said area settlers had found out about Shawsheen's imminent execution and sent a messenger to Camp Collins to warn them. Capt. Hardy detailed Sgt. Carroll to take a squad of a dozen men and he proceeded at all speed to the village located "some ten or twelve miles from Camp Collins, down the creek. Upon coming in sight of the village the soldiers noticed an unusual commotion, and when they rode in among the tepees no captive was to be seen, but the preparations had been undisturbed, as they found a fence post erected in the centre of the camp, and a quantity of wood around it ready to be ignited. After considerable searching the squaw was discovered in one of the lodges, concealed under a lot of buffalo robes, with her head closely shaved in readiness for the sacrifice". Sgt. Carroll brought her ought, mounted her behind him on his own horse over the strenuous objections of her captors, and with the squad returned in safety to Camp Collins.

According to West Shawsheen then stayed with Carroll and his wife Mary in camp for around two months. Mary took great interest in her, made her several dresses and gave her the name "Susan", likely an anglicized approximation of her name as pronounced out loud. The Carrolls thought highly of her, considering her unusually intelligent, including learning English language quite well in such a short time. West said "Mrs. Carroll had all confidence in her, leaving her in charge of her quarters when away. She sometimes appeared to be getting home-sick to return to her tribe, but no opportunity occurred to return her to her friends." Shawsheen "...always seemed to be very grateful to the soldiers for rescuing her from the old-time enemies of her tribe, and tried in every way to show her gratitude to Carroll and his men." On July 4, 1863 the Carrolls returned from a dance to discover Shawsheen had vanished, taking her dresses, a piece of meat and a butcher knife but nothing else. The Carrolls and fellow troops feared she had been recaptured and searched for her thoroughly the next day but found no sign of her enemies. Members of Company D stationed at Middle Park reported Shawsheen showed up at their camp sometime later, remained several days, then proceeded west to rejoin her tribe. In summer 1864 members of Company M confirmed she had successfully rejoined them when they saw and talked with her with her own people when they were camped at Colorado City.

Susan remains a name many historians refer to her by today. The Carrolls, upon hearing news of her involvement in the Meeker events, continued to "feel a lively interest in her, and feel well repaid for the kindness they were able to show her sixteen years ago." Mary Carroll, upon learning she still used the name Susan, was "quite proud of the fact that her ward has thought enough of it to retain it all these years." There is some debate regarding Shawsheen's escape from captivity; many historians cite the story of her rescue from near sacrifice as correct, however the oral traditions of her descendants credit her with escaping on her own. During her time in captivity, she was treated as a slave instead of an adopted family member as in other North American Indian captivities. Her status within the tribe as a slave meant that she was forced into hard labor and menial tasks until her eventual escape.

== Meeker Massacre ==
The Meeker Massacre was an attack on an Indian Agency by the Ute on September 29, 1879 in Meeker, Colorado. During the massacre, Nathan Meeker, an Indian Agent, along with his ten employees were killed, and his daughter Josephine Meeker and wife Arvilla Meeker were taken captive along with other women and children by the Ute. After the Massacre, the Ute met and discussed what to do with the captives. While many urged that the captives be killed or burned at the stake, Shawsheen, along with her husband, adamantly advocated for the release of the captives and their safety. Josephine Meeker said of her captivity, "We all owe our lives to the sister of Chief Ouray..." The captives praised Shawsheen for her kindness in not only advocating for their release, but doing her best in keeping them safe from harm for the duration of their captivity. The captive women even referred to her as "God Bless Susan" for her kindness. After the captives were released they immediately began to write about their experiences and many called for the recognition of Shawsheen for her actions. Jane Swisshelm asked that Shawsheen be given land in Colorado, despite the fact that the Ute's of western Colorado were being removed to Utah.

Shawsheen has been hailed as a hero, by not only the Meeker women, but many others, for her actions within the Meeker Massacre and her protection of the captives. Josephine Meeker wrote about Shawsheen in her captivity narrative. She stated, "I may say more, which is that we all owe our lives to the sister of Chief Ouray." Josephine describes how Shawsheen advocated for their release and ensured their safety.

== Names ==
Shawsheen has been referred to by many names throughout her historical narrative. Her descendants refer to her as She-Towitch, while many modern historians refer to her as Susan, "Ute Susan" or Shawsheen. She has also been known as Tsashin, Shosheen, Shashein, and Shasheen in other newspaper or familial accounts.

== Life and legacy ==
Shawsheen's life and contributions to early Colorado history have been recognized by the Greeley Museums in Greeley, Colorado. This organization also preserves and interprets the Meeker Home Museum, the original home of the Meeker family. In Greeley, there is an elementary school named after her, (Shawsheen Elementary) as well as scholarship on her life and legacy on display at the Greeley Museum.
