= Ouray (Ute leader) =

Native American leader

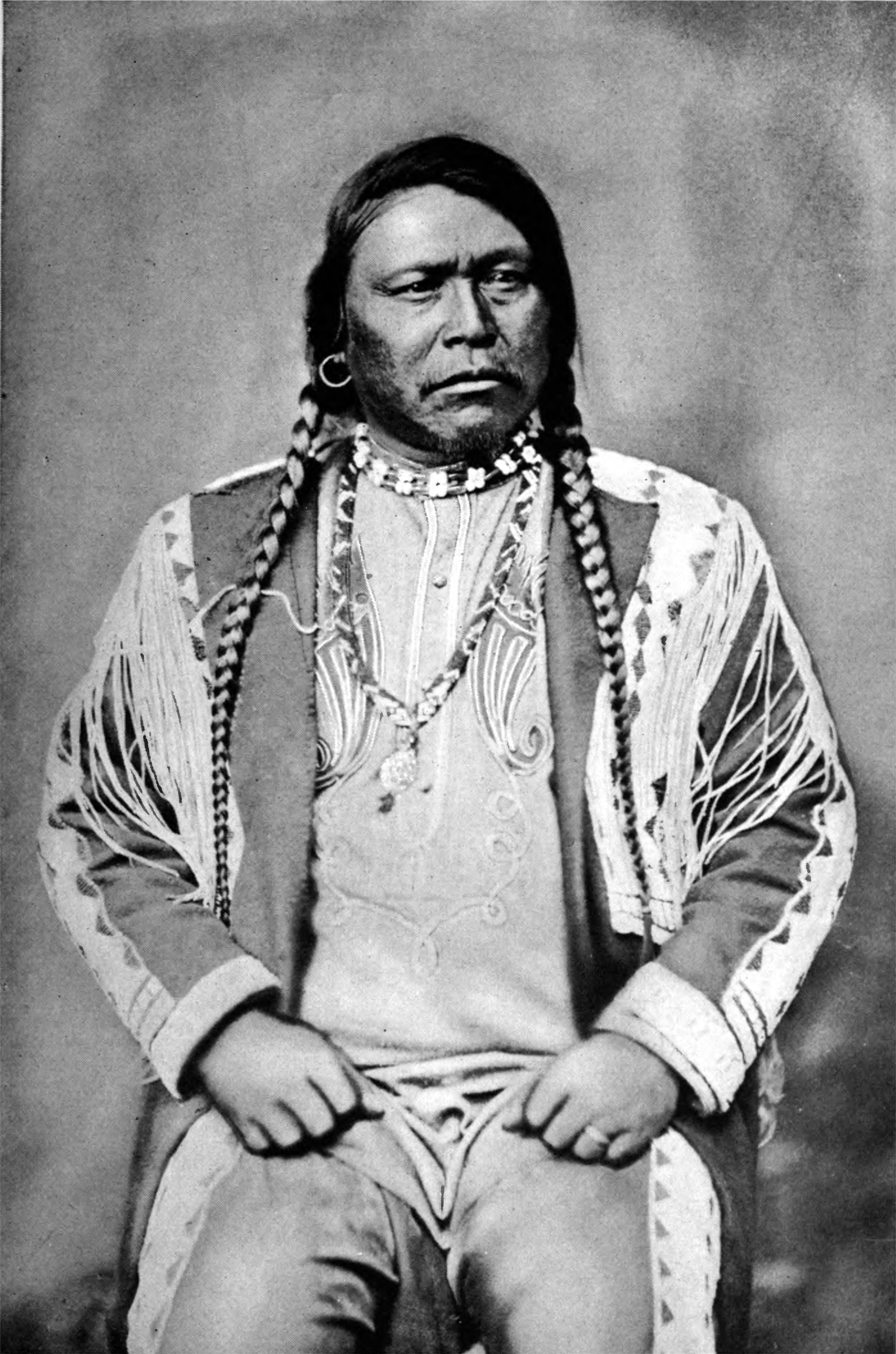
Ouray, Ute Chief, Colorado, 1874

Chief Ouray (/ˈjʊəreɪ/, c. 1833 – August 20, 1880) was a Native American chief of the Tabeguache (Uncompahgre) band of the Ute tribe, then located in western Colorado. Because of his leadership ability, Ouray was acknowledged by the United States government as a chief of the Ute and he traveled to Washington, D.C. to negotiate for the welfare of the Utes. Raised in the culturally diverse town of Taos, Ouray learned to speak many languages that helped him in the negotiations, which were complicated by the manipulation of his grief over his five-year-old son, abducted during an attack by the Sioux. Ouray met with Presidents Lincoln, Grant, and Hayes and was called the "man of peace" because he sought to make treaties with settlers and the government.

Following the White River War of 1879, he traveled in 1880 to Washington, D.C. He tried to secure a treaty for the Uncompahgre Ute, who wanted to stay in Colorado; but, the following year, the United States forced the Uncompahgre and the White River Ute to the west to reservations in present-day Utah.

== Early life and education ==
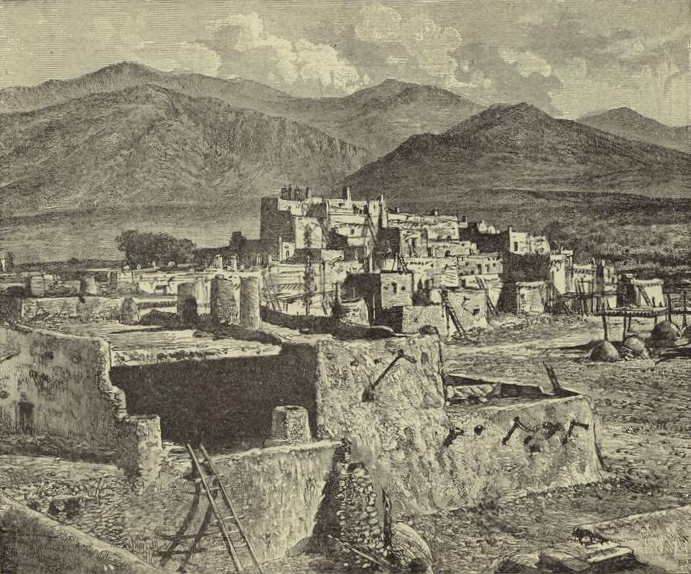
Illustration of Taos Pueblo, 1893

Ouray was born in 1833 near the Taos Pueblo in Nuevo México, now in the state of New Mexico. (Note: His year of birth is also given as 1820.) (Note: According to oral history, he was born on a clear night of November 13, 1833, during the Leonid meteor showers, which was taken as an omen. In Ute, Ouray means “arrow,” drawn from the meteor shower that occurred during the time of his birth.) His father, Guera Murah, also called Salvador, was a Jicarilla Apache adopted into the Ute, and his mother was Uncompahgre Ute.

His parents had another son named Quench, and then his mother died soon after. His father remarried and his stepmother left Ouray and his brother to live on a ranch with a Spanish-speaking couple around 1843 or 1845. His father returned to Colorado and became a leader of the Tabeguache Ute band and the boys remained in Taos. Ouray received a Catholic education and was raised in the Catholic faith. Living in a culturally diverse location, he learned Ute and Apache languages, sign language, Spanish, and English, which he found helpful later in life in negotiating with whites and Native Americans. He spent much of his youth working for Mexican sheepherders. He also hauled wood and packed mules that were bound for the Santa Fe Trail.

In 1850, Ouray and his brother left Taos to join their father, who died soon after. Ouray was the band's best rider, hunter, and fighter, and he became an enforcer (like a chief of police) and then sub-chief of the band. He fought both the Kiowa and the Sioux while living among the Tabeguache.

== Chief and negotiator ==
=== Chief ===
In 1860, Ouray became chief of the band at the age of 27. That year, he engaged in a "fact-finding tour" to determine the number of whites that were settling in the Uncompahgre and Gunnison River valleys and was alarmed by the number of miners and settlers on ancestral lands of the Utes. He understood, though, that fighting the whites would not turn back the tide of colonialism. Instead, he believed that the solution was to engage in treaty negotiations to protect their interests.

=== Treaty negotiation ===
Long time ago, Utes always had plenty. On the prairie, antelope and buffalo, so many Ouray couldn't count. In the mountains, deer and bear everywhere. In the streams, trout, duck, beaver, everything… White man came, and now Utes grow hungry a heap… White man grow a heap, red man no grow—soon die all.

— Ouray, in an Annual Report of the Commissioner of Indian Affairs

Ouray was known as the "White man's friend," and his services were almost indispensable to the government in negotiating with his tribe, who kept in good faith all treaties that were made by him. He protected their interests as far as possible, and set them the example of living a civilized life.

It might be added that Ouray himself, who pronounced his name as 'You-ray', never seemed to have objected to being called 'Chief of all the Utes' and he did not hesitate to sign documents by that title.

Although Ouray sought reconciliation between different peoples, with the belief that war with the whites likely meant the demise of the Ute tribe, other more militant Utes considered him a coward for his propensity to negotiate. Disturbed by the treaties that Ouray entered into, his brother-in-law "Hot Stuff" tried to kill him with an axe during his near-daily visit to the Los Piños Indian Agency in 1874.

==== Treaty of Conejos of 1863 ====
Colorado Territory was established on February 28, 1861. In 1862, he convinced Utes to negotiate with the government to enter into a treaty to ensure the protection of hereditary lands of the Tabeguache. Kit Carson had noticed in 1862 that prospectors were mining and settling in areas that had been traditional hunting grounds for the Utes and game was becoming scarce. Carson helped him draft a treaty. Ouray was part of the delegation and was the translator in a meeting with the new Territorial Governor John Evans, after which he traveled to Washington, D.C. to meet with President Abraham Lincoln.

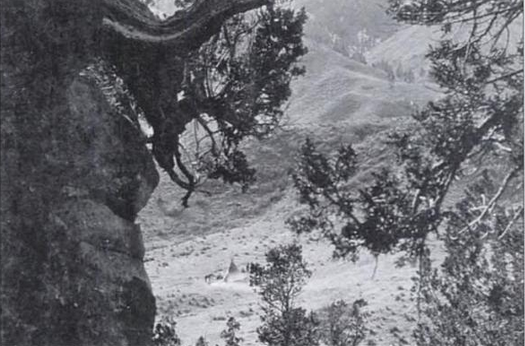
Valley of springs in present-day Manitou Springs, where Ute came to hunt and take the mineral springs. The center of the photograph shows a "lone encampment" of Ute Native Americans, between 1874 and 1879.

Ouray negotiated with the U.S. government for the Treaty of Conejos (1863), which reduced their lands to 50% of what it had been, losing all lands east of the Continental Divide that included healing waters at Manitou Springs and the sacred land on Pikes Peak. It guaranteed that they would have the western one third of the state of the Colorado. The Utes agreed that they would allow roads and military forts to be built on the land. As an encouragement to take up farming, they were given sheep, cattle, and $10,000 in goods and provisions over ten years. The government generally did not provide the goods, provisions, or livestock mentioned in the treaty, and since game was scarce many Ute continued to hunt on ancestral Ute lands until they were removed to reservations in 1880 and 1881. (Note: The Pikes Peak Historical Society created an endowment fund in 2001 so that Utes could return to sacred places on Pikes Peak, including the ancient scarred trees that has been using for various ceremonial purposes, prayer, burial, and medicine or healing trees. Some of the "living artifacts" of the Utes are about 800 years old.)

==== Treaty of 1868 ====
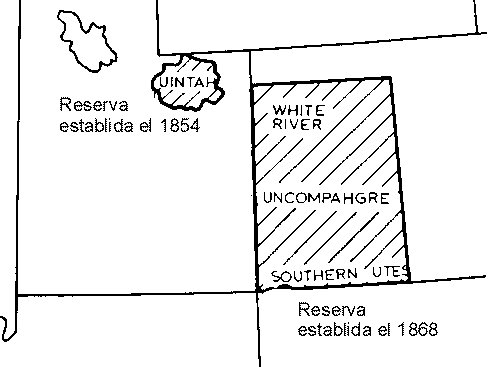
The Treaty of 1868 resulted in the creation of a reservation for the Utes in western Colorado

Around 1866, there were some Native Americans who had stolen livestock and otherwise upset new settlers. Following an uprising by Chief Kaniatse, Colonel Kit Carson successfully negotiated a treaty with the Ouray and other Ute leaders in 1867. In the meantime, the government became interested in obtaining some more Ute land. Since the government had not lived up to its agreement to provide provisions for the winter months, Ouray was reluctant to give the government more land. Many Native Americans, though, were "in dire straits" and he agreed to be part of a delegation.

In 1868, Ouray, Nicaagat, with Kit Carson were among a delegation to negotiate a treaty that would result in the creation of a reservation for the Ute, served by an Indian Agencies at White River and near Montrose with a school, blacksmith shop, sawmill, and warehouse. They lost a little land in the treaty, but Ouray hoped that having a government presence would mean that their lands would be protected. The treaty was signed by 47 Ute chiefs.

==== Brunot Treaty of 1873 ====
Silver deposits were found in the San Juan Mountains in 1872 and the government wanted again to negotiate for more land. Feeding on his grief due to the unknown status of his son after the Utes were attacked by the Sioux, U.S. Commissioner of Indian Affairs Felix Brunot had a 17-year-old orphan brought by Arapaho Chief Powder Face to meet Ouray and Chipeta in Washington, D.C. ten years after the abduction. This was the first of many attempts by Brunot to find his son and was conducted so that Ouray would relinquish mining property and keep treaty talks open. The boy was clearly not Ouray's son, he did not know anything from the Ute language, did not want to go with Ouray, and the details of his capture did not match the experience of Ouray's son. Tribal historians have stated that this meeting was upsetting to Ouray, but author Richard E. Wood states that the chief was impressed by the effort taken by the government. In 1873, with Ouray's help, the Brunot Agreement was ratified and the United States acquired the mineral-rich property they had been seeking. In exchange, the Native Americans were to receive provisions over time. Ouray was given land and a house in the Uncompahgre Valley near the Indian Agency. The government, though, was again reluctant to provide provisions. His negotiations had included a meeting with President Ulysses S. Grant.

=== Meeker Massacre ===
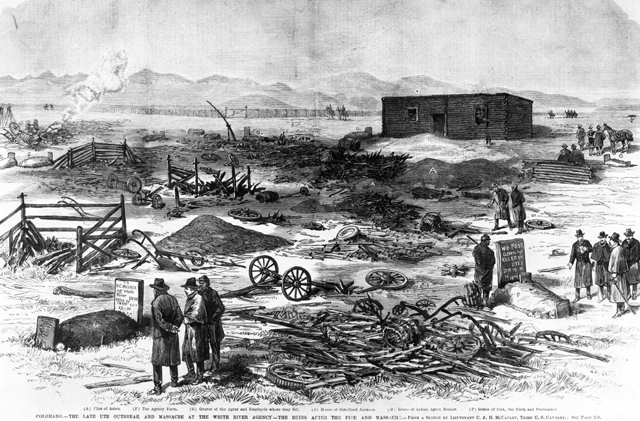
An etching that appeared in the December 6, 1879 edition of Frank Leslie's Illustrated Newspaper depicts the aftermath of the "Meeker Massacre." Meeker grave at lower left; W.H. Post grave at lower right

Tensions increased in the area following the Meeker Massacre (1879) at the White River Indian Agency. Not understanding the Utes' love of horses, Nathan Meeker had their race track plowed and tried to force the nomadic hunters and gatherers to farm, and Meeker sought military help. Seeking peace, a tribe of Ute men led by Chief Douglas asked Meeker for peace, but a fight ensued. This made further negotiations for peace between Native Americans and whites very difficult. Local settlers demanded that the Utes be moved. When Ouray found out about the massacre, he asked, as head of the Utes, for the warriors to disperse and release hostages to him. The hostages, including Josephine Meeker, were delivered to Ouray's house at the Los Piños Indian Agency and were cared for by Chipeta.

=== Final treaty ===
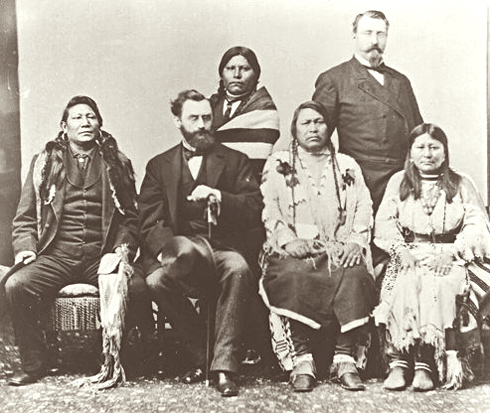
Photo taken in 1880 in Washington D.C. when Ouray and other Utes traveled to Washington. D.C. to negotiate a treaty that would result in the removal of the White River and Tabeguache Utes from Colorado to the Uintah Basin in present-day Utah. Ouray died shortly after this trip. Seated from left to right: Ignacio of the Southern Utes, Carl Shurz, Secretary of the Interior, Ouray and his wife, Chipeta. Standing are Woretsiz and General Charles Adams.

The U.S. government appointed a commission to determine a reservation for the Ute and Ouray and Chipeta went to Washington, D.C. in 1880 for the final treaty for the Utes. Members of the commission were Alfred B. Meacham, former U.S. Superintendent of Indian Affairs for Oregon; Otto Mears, a railroad executive, and George W. Manypenny, former Commissioner of Indian Affairs. When President Rutherford B. Hayes met Ouray in Washington, DC, he said that the Ute was "the most intellectual man I've ever conversed with."

When he had returned to Colorado, and while dying with Bright's disease, Ouray traveled to the Ignacio Indian Agency office to have the treaty signed by the Southern Utes.

Utes were later put on a reservation in Utah, Uintah and Ouray Indian Reservation, as well as two reservations in Colorado: Ute Mountain Ute Tribe and Southern Ute Indian Reservation.

== Personal life ==
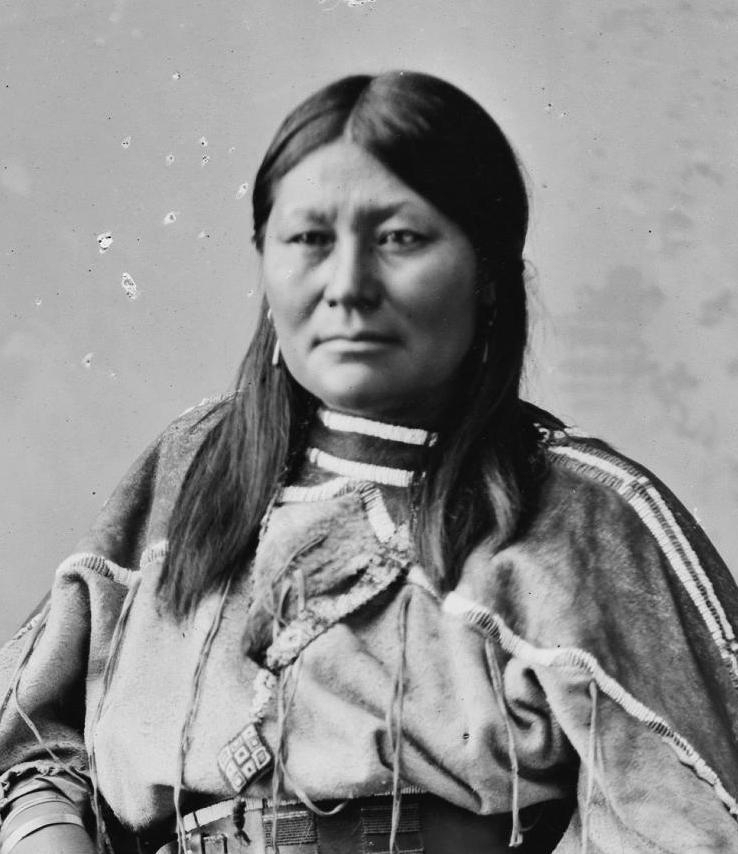
Chipeta

Ouray's first wife, Black Mare, died after the birth of their only child, a boy named Queashegut, also known as Pahlone, and called Paron (apple) by his father because of his round, dimpled face. In 1859, Ouray married the sixteen-year old Chipeta (Ute meaning: White Singing Bird), who had been caring for Ouray's son since Black Mare's death earlier that year.

When Queashegut was five years old, Ouray took him along on a buffalo hunt with a total party of 31 men in 1860 or 1863. Their hunting camp, near Fort Lupton, was attacked by 300 Sioux warriors and Queashegut left the tepee where he sought shelter with Chipeta to follow Ute warriors. After the fight, they were unable to find him. He had been captured and traded to an Arapaho band. Ouray never saw his son again and remained in deep grief. He tried to find his son for the rest of his life and feared "he was raised to fight against his own." While visiting Kit Carson at Fort Garland in 1866, Ouray and Chipeta met and adopted two girls and two boys.

Ouray's sister, Shawsheen (also Tsashin and Susan), was in Big Thompson Canyon in 1861 or 1863 when she was abducted by the Arapaho. Soldiers from Fort Collins found her two years later in 1863 or 1865, but she was afraid of them and escaped. She was later found by Utes and returned to Ouray's tribe.

He had several homes in Colorado, one of them by the town of Ouray. For twenty years, Ouray lived with Chipeta on a farm on the Uncompahgre River near Montrose. The 300-acre farm had pasture land and 50 acres of irrigated farm land. The six-room adobe house was well-furnished, including a piano and fine china. The Ute Indian Museum is located on their original 8.65 acre homestead in Montrose. Chipeta was a member of a Methodist church; Ouray was an Episcopalian. Ouray never cut his long Ute-fashion hair, though he often dressed in the European-American style.

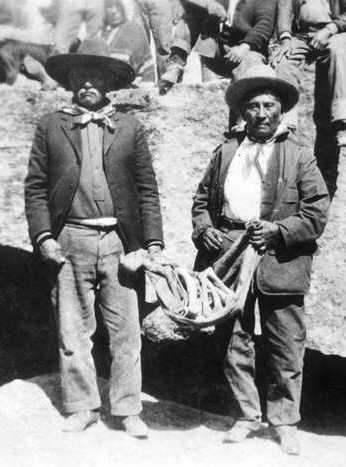
Buckskin Charlie and John McCook at the reburial of Ouray, Ignacio, Colorado, 1925

Ouray died on August 24, 1880, near the Los Piños Indian Agency in Colorado. His people secretly buried him near Ignacio, Colorado. (Note: His date of death was also stated to have been August 20, 1880.) Forty-five years later, in 1925, his bones were re-interred in a full ceremony led by Buckskin Charley and John McCook at the Ignacio cemetery.

A 1928 article in the Denver Post reads in part, "He saw the shadow of doom on his people" and a 2012 article writes, "He sought peace among tribes and whites, and a fair shake for his people, though Ouray was dealt a sad task of liquidating a once-mighty force that ruled nearly 23 million acres of the Rocky Mountains."

== Legacy and honors ==
Ouray's obituary in The Denver Tribune stated:

In the death of Ouray, one of the historical characters passes away. He has figured for many years as the greatest Indian of his time, and during his life has figured quite prominently. Ouray is in many respects...a remarkable Indian...pure instincts and keen perception. A friend to the white man and protector to the Indians alike.

== Places named for Ouray ==
- Camp Chief Ouray, located in Granby, Colorado.
- Mount Ouray in the Sawatch Mountain Range and Ouray Peak in Chaffee County, both in Colorado, were named for him.
- Ouray County and its county seat, the town of Ouray in Colorado, as well as the community of Ouray, Utah are named for him.
- SS Chief Ouray, a World War II liberty ship, now named USS Deimos
