= Thomas Tipton Thornburgh =

Thomas T. Thornburgh
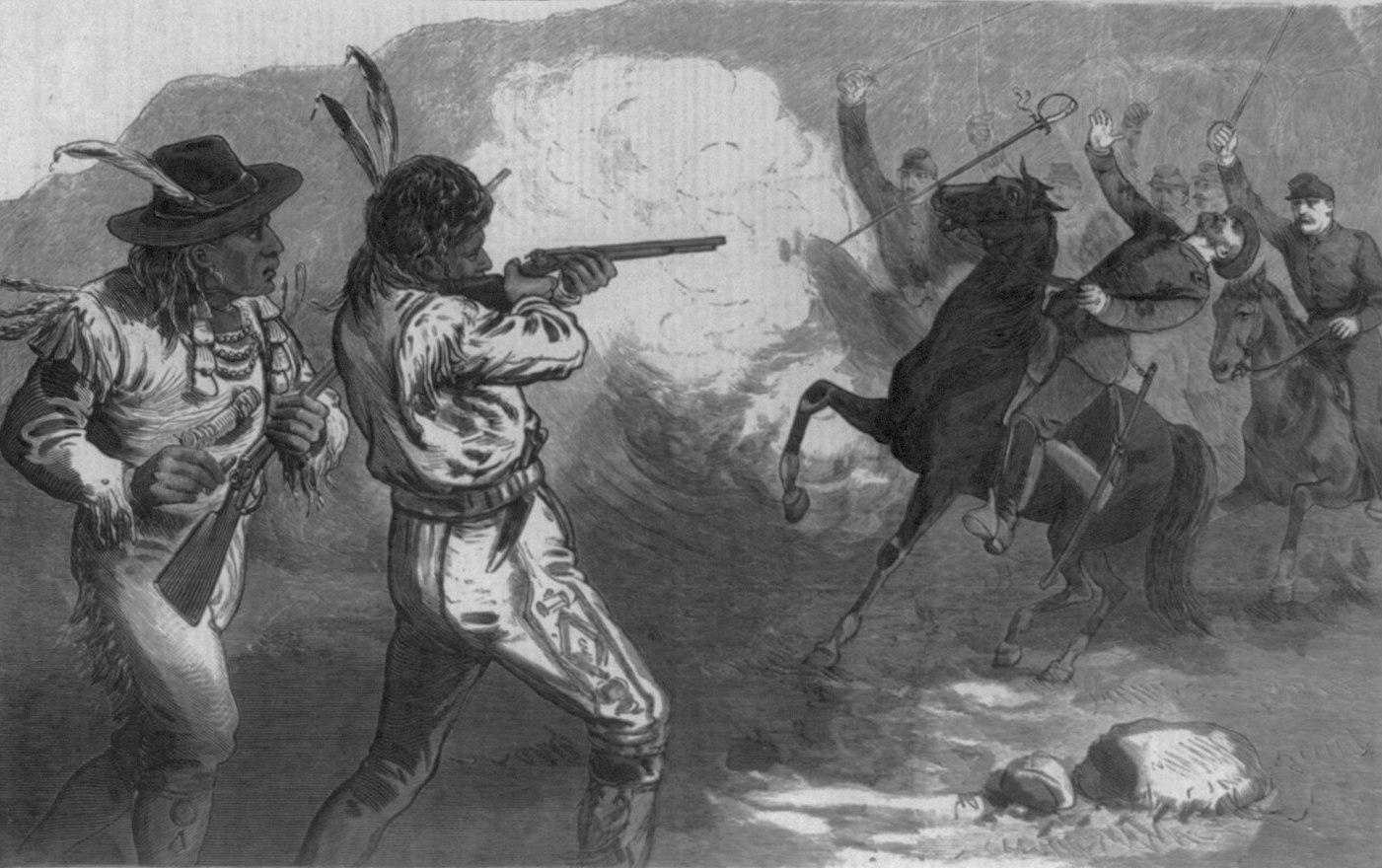
- death of the gallant Major Thornburgh
- Born: December 26, 1843; New Market, Tennessee, United States
- Died: September 29, 1879 (aged 35); Battle of Milk Creek, Colorado, United States
- Resting place: Arlington National Cemetery
- Occupation: Military officer
- Known for: Battle of Milk Creek

Thomas Tipton Thornburgh (December 26, 1843 – September 29, 1879) was a career soldier, starting during the American Civil War when he enlisted with the Sixth East Tennessee Volunteers for the Union Army. Mid-war, he left the ranks to study at the United States Military Academy at West Point, graduating in 1867. After serving in the west for a number of years, he was made the commander of Fort Steele and Indian scout who received orders to establish peace with the White River Utes. With about 180 men, Thornburgh entered the White River Ute Reservation on September 16, 1879, and he and 13 of his men where killed during the Battle of Milk Creek.

== Early life ==
Thomas Tipton Thornburgh was born in New Market, Tennessee on December 26, 1843, the son of Olivia and M. Thornburgh, an attorney. Both of his parents were born in Tennessee. He had an older brother, Jacob, who was Congressman Thornburgh of Tennessee, and an older sister, Mary.

== Military career ==
In 1861, Thornburgh enlisted in the Sixth East Tennessee Volunteers as a private and was quickly promoted to sergeant-major, lieutenant, and adjunct. He served during the American Civil War at the Battle of Mill Springs, Morgan's retreat to the Ohio, and the Battle of Stones River. He served until August 1863.

Thornburgh enrolled at West Point, the United States Military Academy, on July 1, 1863, and graduated on June 17, 1867, and that day he was promoted to second lieutenant in the second artillery.

He was first stationed at Presidio of San Francisco, remaining there until February 25, 1868. From there he went to Fort Monroe, Virginia and was there from April 13, 1868, to May 1869. He was then at Alcatraz Island until November 10, 1871, except during a period when he was detached and sent to Sitka, Alaska, from August 23 to November 17, 1869. From December 6, 1869, to April 1870, he was professor of military science at San Diego, California.

In April 1870, he was promoted to first or second lieutenant. He was then a professor of military tactics at East Tennessee University until 1873. Thornburgh was in the garrison at Fort Foote in Maryland from November 27, 1871, to June 20, 1873, when he became an active member of the masonic degree of knighthood in the Demolay Commandery, No. 4 of Washington, D.C. He was transferred to Fort Brown on August 13, 1874, and was there until January 20, 1877. He was at Fort Omaha for fifteen months until May 23, 1878.

He was promoted to the rank of Major in April 1875 and appointed to the position of paymaster in San Antonio, Texas on July 12, 1875. In May 1878, he was assigned to the Fourth United States Infantry. He was then the commander of Fort Steele in Wyoming until June 19, 1878. After than, he was on scouting duty.

=== Battle of Milk Creek ===
Indian agent Nathan Meeker and other officials from Colorado asked for help from the War Department due to a deepening divide between the Utes of western Colorado and the White River Indian Agency and area inhabitants. An expedition was organized to stop the months of trouble between the Indian Agency and the Utes. On September 16, 1879, Thornburgh received an order from army headquarters "to move with a sufficient number of troops to the White River Ute Agency, Colorado, under special instructions". It was a difficult order to receive. He thought that Meeker complained about minor issues and Thornburgh liked the Utes.

Major Thornburgh, the commander of Fort Steele, arranged for around 180 soldiers from companies D and F of the Fifth Cavalry, led by Lieutenant B. D. Price and Captain J. S. Payne. The group included a quartermaster and surgeon. A supply train of 25 wagons brought provisions to last around 30 days. They intended to stay up to 45 days, foraging for food the last 15 days. Thornburg intended to arrest and hold anyone that Meeker identified as problem-some people.

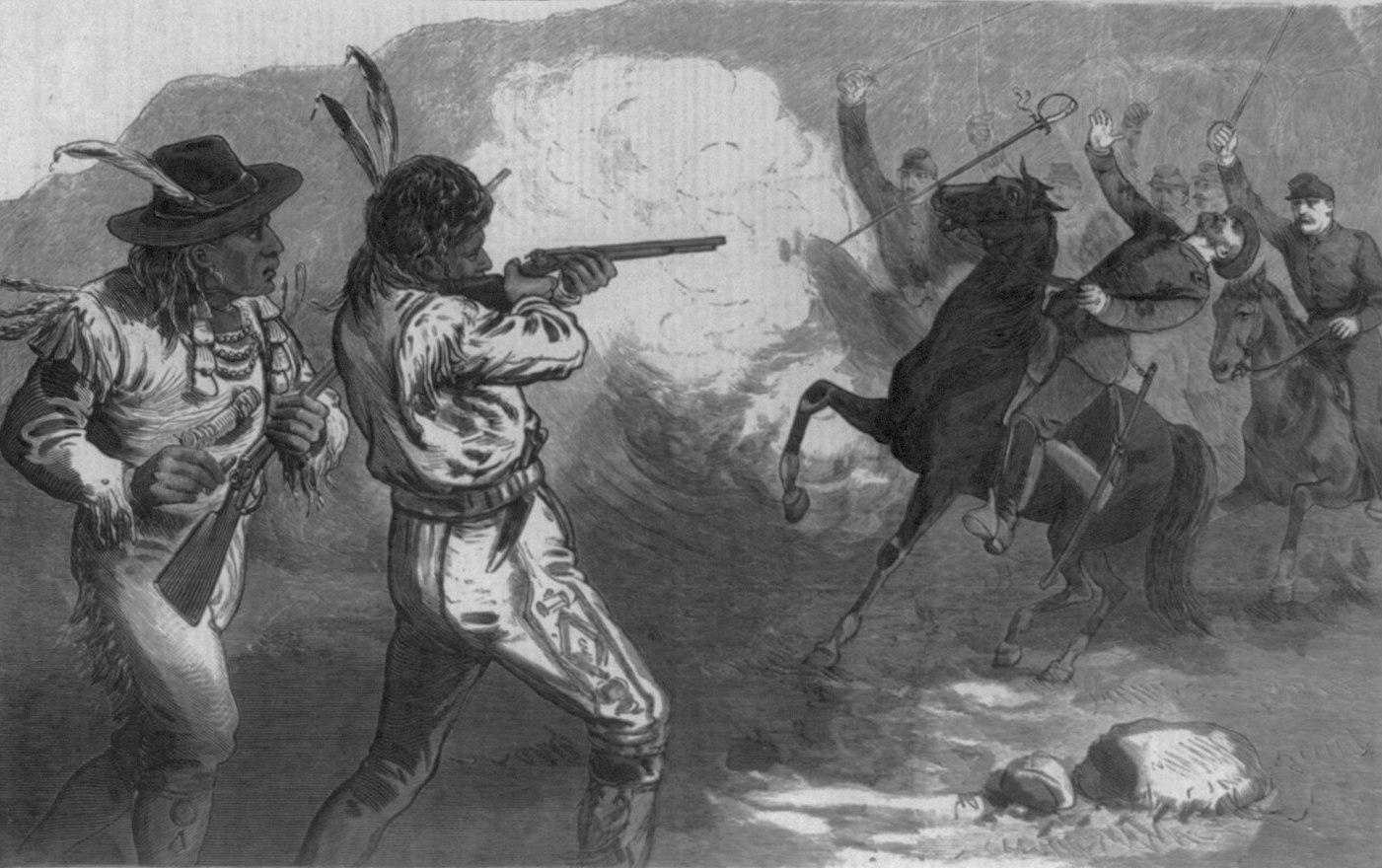
Battle of Milk Creek – death of Major Thornburgh, of the Fourth United States Infantry, while heading a charge of his men against a band of Ute Indians.

Thornburgh and his troops left Fort Steele in present-day Wyoming for northwestern Colorado on August 22, 1879. Chief Jack (Nicaagat) met the expedition at Yampa River, seeking to understand the purpose and strength of the exhibition. He was peaceful, but dubious that the military had peaceful intentions and was very bitter about Meeker's intentions. He asked Thornburgh to enter the Ute reservation at Milk Creek without other soldiers for a peaceful negotiation between the Utes, the White River Indian Agency, and Thornburgh.

Thornton and his soldiers saw a line of Ute soldiers on a ridge as they entered the Ute reservation on September 29, 1879. They were headed for the White River Agency when they were ambushed in the Milk Creek valley. Thornburgh was shot above his ear, fell from his horse, and died. The conflict was called the Battle of Milk Creek and the battle site extends over about 1,600 acres. Meeker, others at the White River Agency, Thornburgh, and 11 or 13 of his soldiers were killed in the attack on the Agency and at Milk Creek. Some women and children were taken captive by the Utes.

== Personal life ==
Thornburgh married Eliza Clarke, daughter of Robert Clarke, in Nebraska on December 26, 1870. His wife was the sister of a fellow West Point student. Thornburg and his wife, also called Lida, lived at Fort Steele, during which they had a daughter Olivia and a son Bobby. Thornburg was commander of Fort Steele, where he lived with his wife and three children. (Note: Mrs. Thornburg and their family went to Omaha, Nebraska after his death.) They had a son who died while at Fort Steele and was interred in the cemetery there. Upon Thornburgh's death, his son's body was moved and placed in his grave in Omaha, Nebraska.

== Death and legacy ==
After his death in 1879, his father-in-law, Major Clarke, traveled to the front to receive his body, which was then transported by train to Omaha, Nebraska. His body was received by a detachment of the Knights Templar of Nebraska and taken to the Masonic Hall, where he was laid in state. He was buried at Spring Forest Cemetery. In 1903, his body was moved to Arlington National Cemetery in Arlington, Virginia. His wife died on June 28, 1930, and she was interred next to her husband at Arlington National Cemetery on July 2, 1930.

He was a man of splendid physique, an ambitious, brave and gallant officer and a whole-souled gentleman.

— Obituary, The Jasper Weekly Courier

The town of Thornburgh, Colorado and Thornburgh Mountain, 16.5 and 15 miles northeast of Meeker, respectively, were named for him.

== Bibliography ==
- Burkey, Elmer R. (May 1936). "The Thornburg Battle with the Utes on Milk Creek" (PDF). Colorado Magazine. Vol. 13, no. 3.
