= Charles Adams (Colorado Indian agent) =

United States Army officer, diplomat, businessman

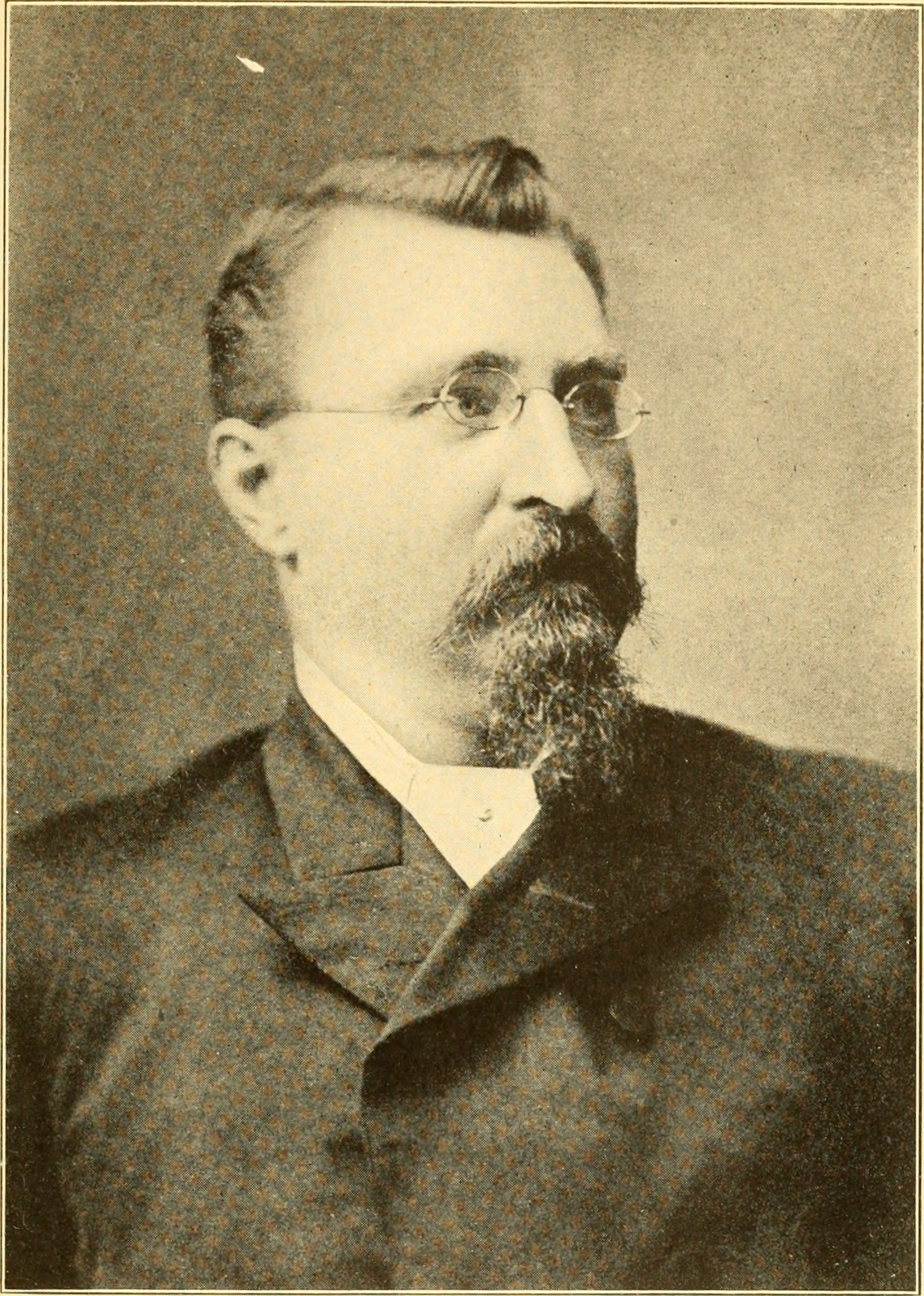
- Portrait of Adams in a 1912 publication
- Born: December 19, 1845; Anklam, Kingdom of Prussia
- Died: August 19, 1895 (aged 49); Denver, Colorado, U.S.
- Occupations: United States Army officer; US Indian agent; Diplomat
- Spouse: Margaret Thompson Phelps

Charles Adams (born Karl Adam Schwanbeck; December 19, 1845 – August 19, 1895) was a United States Army officer, US Indian agent, diplomat and businessman. In 1879 he secured the release of five hostages taken captive by the White River Utes after the Meeker Massacre, and held an official inquiry into their treatment. In 1880 he was appointed minister to Bolivia, where he served for two years. Returning to Colorado, he became involved in mining and water development.

== Early life and education ==
Born in Anklam, Province of Pomerania, Kingdom of Prussia in 1845, Charles was the son of cabinetmaker Karl Heinrich and Maria J. Mackman Schwanbeck. His family immigrated to the United States after the Revolutions of 1848 in Germany.

== Career ==
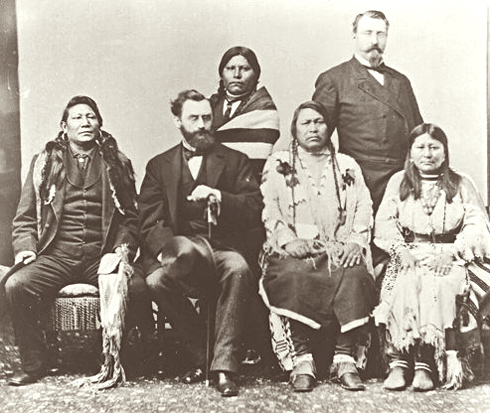
Delegation of Ute Indians in Washington, D.C. in 1880. Background: Woretsiz and General Charles Adams are standing. Front from left to right: Chief Ignatio of the Southern Utes; Secretary of the Interior Carl Schurz; Chief Ouray and his wife Chipeta.

Schwanbeck fought as a young man in the late years of the American Civil War. After the war he migrated to the Colorado Territory. About 1870, he was appointed a brigadier general of the Colorado Militia, by when he had changed his surname to Adams. In addition, he was appointed as US Indian Agent to the Ute Tribe, serving through 1874. There were distinct groups of Utes in Colorado, although settlers often could not distinguish them. Adams dealt primarily with the White Rivers and Uncompahgre Utes.

During these years, Adams established good relationships with Chief Ouray and his wife Chipeta of the Uncompahgre Utes. This friendship was useful in helping him negotiate the release of five captives (three women and two children) taken by the Utes in 1879 after the Meeker Massacre, as part of the White River War. In 1875 Adams was appointed a post office inspector but he also continued with the militia.

== Marriage and family ==
Adams dropped the Schwanbeck surname sometime around 1870, when he married Margaret Thompson Phelps.

== Diplomat ==
In 1880, Adams was appointed the United States minister to Bolivia. In that position, he served as the arbitrator of conferences on the Bolivia and Chile Wars. He remained in that position through 1882.

Returning to Colorado with the change in presidential administrations, Adams became engaged in the manufacture of glass, and mining and mineral water development. He died on August 19, 1895, in the Gumry Hotel disaster in Denver, Colorado when a boiler in the basement of the hotel exploded, destroying the building and killing more than 20 people. He is interred in the Crystal Valley Cemetery in Manitou Springs, Colorado.

Diplomatic posts
Preceded by S. Newton Pettis	United States Minister Resident, Bolivia; 8 July 1880 – 29 August 1882	Succeeded by George Maney
