= Beaver Creek Massacre Site =

- U.S. National Register of Historic Places
- Colorado State Register of Historic Properties
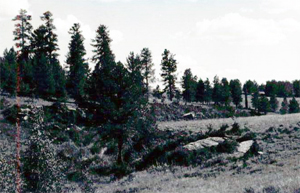
- The site is significant in the history of southwestern Colorado. In June 1885, it was the site of a "battle" between white settlers and a group of Ute Indians
- Nearest city: Dolores, Colorado
- Area: 5 acres (2.0 ha)
- Built: 1885
- NRHP reference No.: 86002670
- CSRHP No.: 5DL.1216
- Added to NRHP: October 02, 1986

Beaver Creek Massacre Site, located about 16 miles (26 km) Dolores, Colorado, occurred on June 19, 1885 between Ute Mountain Utes and white cattlemen over land use and Native American policies established for Native Americans. The last conflict of its kind in Colorado, it followed the Meeker Massacre (September 29, 1879) and Sand Creek Massacre (November 29, 1864). Six or eleven Ute Mountain Ute Tribe people were killed. Two or three days later, a white man and his family were attacked in Montezuma County. Mr. Genthner was killed and his wife was wounded. The Beaver Creek Massacre site is located along a dirt forest road in the Dolores Ranger District of the San Juan National Forest. It was added to the National Register of Historic Places on October 2, 1986.

== Background ==
Utes had difficulty getting enough food to eat. They lived on the Ute Mountain Ute Tribe Reservation where they were supposed to hunt. The federal government was supposed to provide food rations for the Native Americans to compensate for not being able to hunt on their traditional lands. Game, including deer and elk, had roamed through their reservation, but the game were driven off the Ute's land due to cattle ranching and railroads. Whites complained that the Ute people took or killed their cattle and horses.

== Ute hunting party massacred ==
A group of Ute Mountain Ute people set out in June 1885 to hunt. They stopped at a long-standing Ute camp site near Beaver Creek. Six adults and children were killed and two were wounded by cattlemen on June 19. There was only one Ute person who survived.

Colonel P. T. Swaine, the commander of Fort Lewis, sent troops to the site and to patrol the area. Ute police and leaders and Indian Agent Stollsteimer went to the site to investigate. Some settlers sought shelter at the stone barn at Porter ranch.

== Retaliation ==
About June 21, Utes killed Mr. Genthner and wounded his wife. Their children hid in the brush. (Note: The Colorado Encyclopedia states that the children were kidnapped.) They set the Genthner house on fire. Denham states that several white people were killed in Montezuma County.

== Fort Narraguinnep ==
Some of the local residents met up at Narraguinnep Spring and set up a hastely-constructed fort of logs — called Fort Narraguinnep and Narraguinnep Fort — about 25 miles (40 km) north of Dolores at 37°43′49″N 108°34′34″W. The fort was made of large pine logs and a roof was made with poles and dirt. Port holes were cut out of the sides of the fort for shooting. Some of the people who built the fort had killed the Utes. The fort was used for about two weeks. A sign was erected by the National Forest Service to mark the location.

Swaine declined an offer for state troops to come to the site, but increased patrols through the area. The fear among the settlers and Utes calmed down by early July.
