= Henry Johnson (Buffalo Soldier) =

US Army sergeant and recipient of the Medal of Honor (1850–1904)

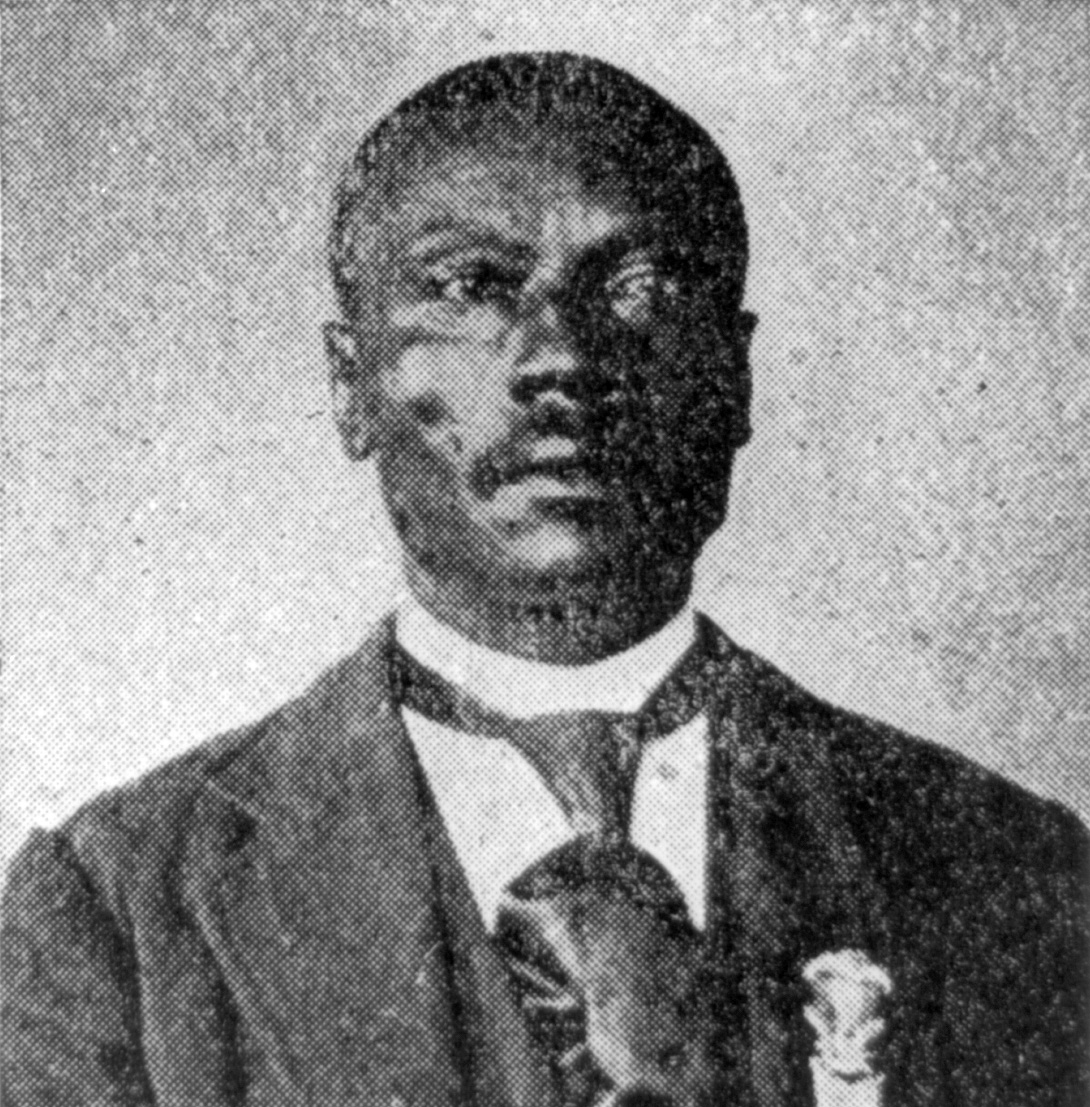
- Sergeant Henry Johnson
- Born: June 11, 1850; Boydton, Virginia, US
- Died: January 31, 1904 (aged 53)
- Burial place: Arlington National Cemetery
- Military career
- Allegiance: United States
- Branch: United States Army
- Service years: 1866–1898
- Rank: Sergeant
- Units: 9th Cavalry Regiment; 10th Cavalry Regiment
- Conflicts: Indian Wars
- Awards: Medal of Honor

Henry Johnson (June 11, 1850 – January 31, 1904) was a Buffalo Soldier in the United States Army and a recipient of America's highest military decoration – the Medal of Honor – for his actions in the Indian Wars of the western United States.

== Career ==
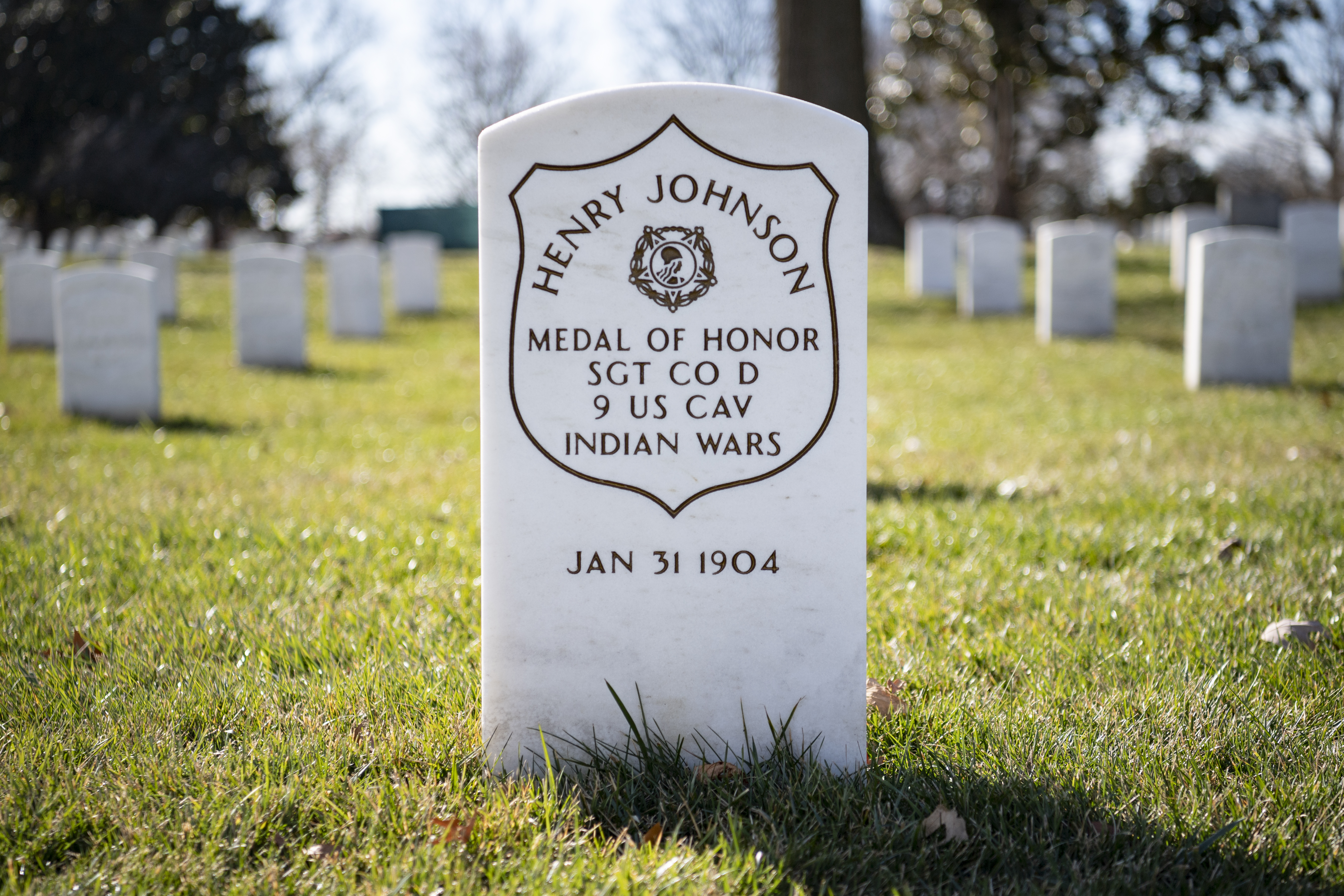
Grave at Arlington National Cemetery

=== Cheyennene wars ===
Johnson was originally from Boydton, Virginia. In 1866, he enlisted in the Army at Detroit, Michigan as an original member of F Troop of the 10th Cavalry. He fought with the 10th against the Cheyenne on the Republican River. Johnson joined D Troop of the 9th Cavalry in June 1877, where the troop was stationed at Fort Wallace. The troop was patrolling southern Colorado at the time of the Meeker Massacre.

=== Meeker Massacre and the Utes ===
On September 29, 1879, a group of Ute warriors, led by Chief Colorow ambushed a group of around 175 soldiers and militiamen from Fort Steele near Milk Creek. At the same time, the Utes also killed the Indian agent and his white employees at the Ute reservation nearby. The troops near the creek created a perimeter around their wagons with dead animals while their remaining animals were picked off by the Utes. Captain Francis Dodge, Sergeant Johnson, and D Troop arrived on October 2, 1879, and were able to enter the encampment without being shot at. For the next three days, D Troop's animals were picked off, leaving only four wounded horses. Johnson was charged with the responsibility of securing the outposts for the defense for the encampment, and under heavy fire from the Utes, made the rounds to meet with his men. On October 5, five troops from the 5th Cavalry arrived shortly after the Ute attackers dispersed.

Johnson was awarded the Medal of Honor at Fort Robinson on September 22, 1890, for his actions during the Battle of Milk Creek against the Ute Indians from October 2–5, 1879 in Colorado. His Medal of Honor citation reads:

Voluntarily left fortified shelter and under heavy fire at close range made the rounds of the pits to instruct the guards, fought his way to the creek and back to bring water to the wounded.

— Indian War Period Medal of Honor recipients, 22 September 1890

At the time of the awarding, he was a private. He had been promoted to sergeant for the third time in 1889, but was demoted after tangling with a bartender at Fort Robinson.

Johnson was a sergeant in Company D. He was cited for twice leaving his position under heavy fire, first to check on his men, then, on October 4, going to the nearby Milk River to obtain water for them. However, some have questioned whether he was under fire when he went for water.

=== Apache wars ===
Shortly after the 5th Cavalry arrived on October 5, 1879, Johnson and D Troop of the 9th Cavalry headed to New Mexico and spent the next two years fighting the Apaches in Victorio's War. He was discharged in January 1883 at Fort Riley. Johnson reenlisted two months later with the 10th Cavalry and was stationed at Fort Grant to once again fight the Apaches. After this five-year enlistment ended in 1888, he rejoined the 9th Cavalry in K Troop.

=== Later career and death ===
K Troop patrolled the Pine Ridge Sioux Reservation for four months in the winter of 1890–1891 before it was moved to Fort Myer in Virginia. K Troop returned to Fort Robinson in 1893. Johnson's final five-year enlistment with K Troop ended in 1898, before the troop was sent to Cuba for the Spanish–American War. He retired that same year to Washington, D.C. Johnson died on January 31, 1904, and is buried in Arlington National Cemetery, Arlington, Virginia, in section 23, lot 16547.

== See also ==
- List of Medal of Honor recipients for the Indian Wars
- List of African American Medal of Honor recipients
