= Nathan Meeker =

American journalist

Nathan C. Meeker
- Born: July 12, 1817; Euclid, Ohio, US
- Died: September 29, 1879 (aged 62); Meeker, Colorado, US

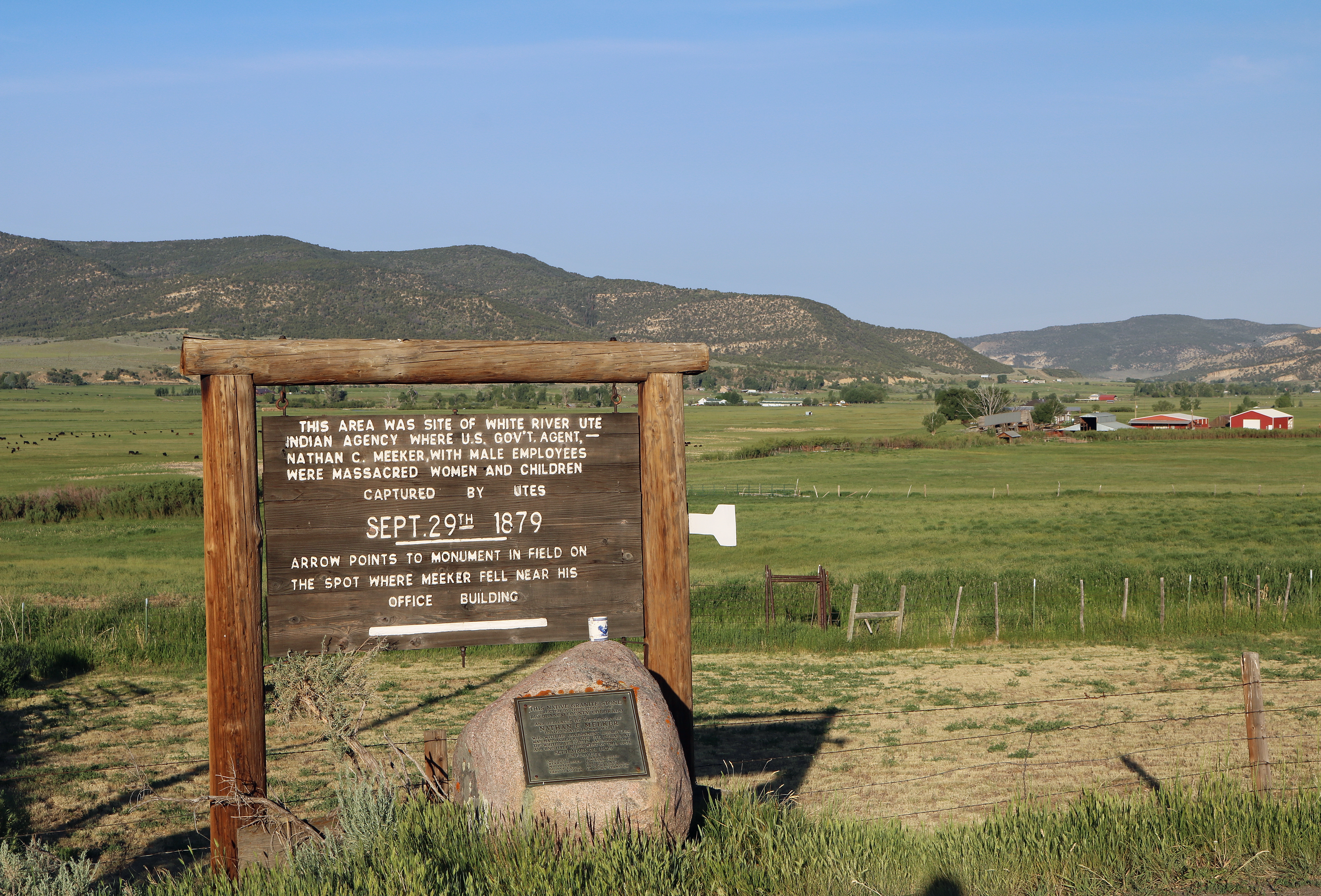
The site of the Meeker massacre.

Nathan Cook Meeker (July 12, 1817 – September 30, 1879) was a 19th-century American journalist, homesteader, entrepreneur, and Indian agent for the federal government. He is noted for his founding in 1870 of the Union Colony, a cooperative agricultural colony in present-day Greeley, Colorado.

In 1878, he was appointed U.S. Agent at the White River Indian Agency in western Colorado. The next year, he was killed by Ute warriors in what became known as the Meeker Massacre. His wife and adult daughter were taken captive for about three weeks. In 1880, the United States Congress passed punitive legislation to remove the Ute from Colorado to Uintah and Ouray Indian Reservation in present-day Utah, and take away most of the land guaranteed them by treaty.

The town of Meeker, Colorado and Mount Meeker in Rocky Mountain National Park are named for him.

== Early life ==
Nathan Cook Meeker was born in Euclid, Ohio on July 12, 1817, (Note: His date of birth is stated as July 17, 1817 in The Encyclopedia of North American Indian Wars, 1607–1890.) to Enoch and Lurana Meeker. He had three brothers. Meeker was a writer and submitted articles to area publications when he was a boy. He left home at 17 years-of-age for New Orleans, where he worked as a copy boy for the New Orleans Picayune. In the late 1830s, Meeker returned to Ohio, where he attended and graduated from Oberlin College.

== Early career and family ==
After college, Meeker worked as a school teacher in Cleveland and Philadelphia. He saved up his money to move to New York, hoping to fulfill a desire to become a poet. In New York, he became a contributor to the Mirror, which was owned by N.P. Willis. Unable to support himself, he moved back to Euclid and was a traveling salesman. Meeker was also a farmer.

Meeker married Arvilla Delight Smith, a Congregationalist, on April 8, 1844. He was baptized a Disciple of Christ to address her concern about his lack of faith. Smith was concerned that Meeker was younger than her. So, he stated that his year of birth was 1814 on their marriage certificate. The couple settled in the Trumbull Phalanx colony in Ohio. The colony was based upon the utopian theories of Charles Fourier. Arvilla taught kindergarten and Nathan was a teacher, historian, auditor, librarian, secretary, and poet laureate. In 1845, their son Ralph Lovejoy was born. Two years later George Columbus was born at the colony. The Trumbull Phalanx colony failed due to financial and health issues in the fall of 1847.

In 1847, Meeker opened a store with his brothers in Cleveland. Rozene was born in 1849 in Munson. The store failed in 1850. Meeker opened another store in Hiram in 1852. He was asked to help found the Western Reserve Eclectic Institute by the Disciples of Christ, but he was furious when his claim was held up because he sold whiskey. He only sold whiskey by prescription, but was so angry over the misunderstanding that he left the church. In 1854, Mary was born in Hiram, and three years later Josephine was born there. Meeker lost his store and property during the Great Panic of 1857. He moved to Dongola, Illinois, where he opened a small store and grew fruit.

Meeker wrote articles, often about sociology, that were published by the Cleveland Plaindealer and reprinted by Horace Greeley in the New-York Tribune. His first novel, The Adventures of Captain Armstrong was published in 1856, with Horace Greeley's assistance.

Meeker became a war correspondent for Greeley in his Cairo, Illinois office during the Civil War. He was present at and reported on the battle at Fort Donelson, among other journalists such as Junius Henri Browne and Charles Carleton Coffin. Meeker became made an agricultural journalist and editor at the end of the war for the New-York Tribune. Meeker's novel Life in the West or Stories of the Mississippi Valley was published in 1866. He went to the Rocky Mountains for the Tribune in 1869, and was inspired to live there.

== Union Colony ==
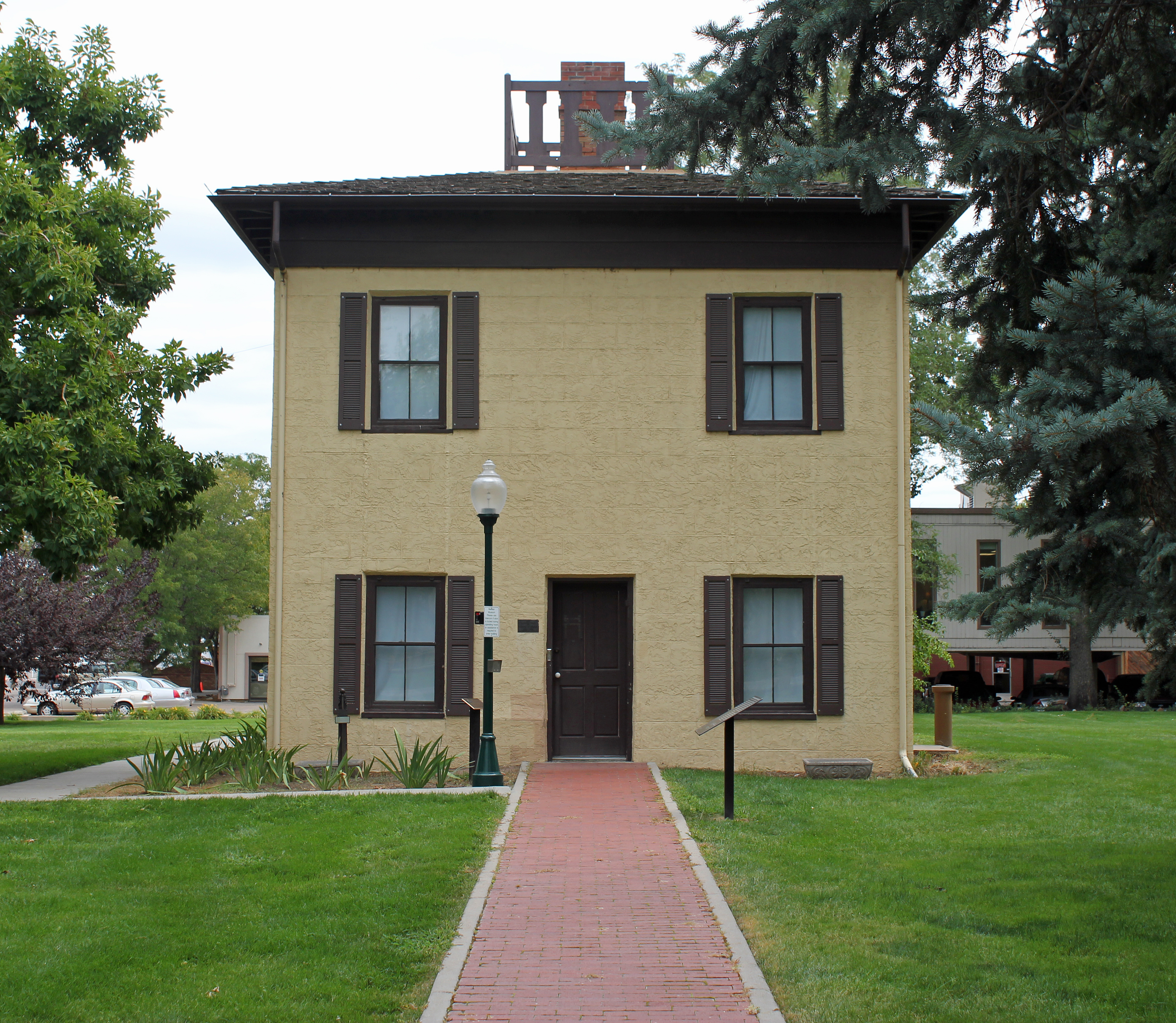
Meeker's former home, now The Meeker Memorial Museum in Greeley, Colorado

Meeker, who was interested in communal and cooperative farms, created his vision of a utopian community based upon Christianity and communal economic enterprise, which was a modification of Charles Fourier’s definition of a utopian society. With the backing of his editor Horace Greeley, Meeker organized the Union Colony (later the town of Greeley) to be settled in the Colorado Territory. He advertised for applicants to move to the South Platte River basin, in what was intended as a cooperative venture for people of "high moral standards" and temperance. Meeker received approximately 3,000 replies that winter, and accepted about 700 of them to purchase shares. With the capital from the shares, in 1870 Meeker purchased 2,000 acres (8 km^{2}), primarily from Native Americans, at the confluence of the South Platte and the Cache La Poudre River (Powder Bag) rivers near present-day Greeley. The venture relied on funding from Horace Greeley. Meeker also founded the Greeley Tribune in 1870.

The Union Colony settlers initiated large-scale irrigation projects in the area. However, shortages of water and competition with other users caused problems. The Union Colony failed on several counts. It was not financially successful, Meeker was deeply in debt, and the community members did not meet Meeker's standards for Christian values.

== Indian agent ==
In 1868, six bands of the Utes signed a treaty with the United States ceding the lands in the eastern part of their range and being granted a reservation of 16,500,000 acres (67,000 km^{2}) (25,781 square miles) comprising most of the western one-third of Colorado. According to Article 2 of the Treaty, the lands on the reservation were "set apart for the absolute and undisturbed use and occupation of the Indians." In return for their land, the U.S. was to give the Utes annuities of food and supplies. The White River Ute Indian Reservation was established to distribute annuities, guaranteed by the treaty, to the Utes. However, the annuities frequently arrived late or not at all.

In 1878, Meeker was appointed to the salaried position of United States (US) Indian agent at the White River Reservation by Henry M. Teller, the Governor of Colorado. Meeker had no experience dealing with Native Americans (Indians). The U.S. government at the time had the objective of assimilating Indians by converting them to Christianity, forcing them to become sedentary farmers, educate their children in boarding schools, and adopt other "civilized" customs. By contrast, the Utes were nomadic hunter-gatherers and seasonal bison hunters. Their prized possessions were their large herds of horses. Arriving at the agency in early 1879, Meeker's first act was to relocate the agency to a valley suitable for agriculture about 3 miles (4.8 km) west of the present day town of Meeker, Colorado. Most of the Utes refused to plow the valley and plant crops. The valley was used by them to graze their horses and engage in their favorite sport of horse racing. Meeker demanded the Utes accede to his wishes, withheld rations and annuities to force their compliance, and wrote newspaper articles condemning their resistance. He told the Utes that the land did not belong to them, but to the U.S. government. He also requested the U.S. cavalry patrol the borders of the Ute Reservation to prevent the Utes from leaving to hunt on their traditional hunting grounds.

== Meeker Massacre ==
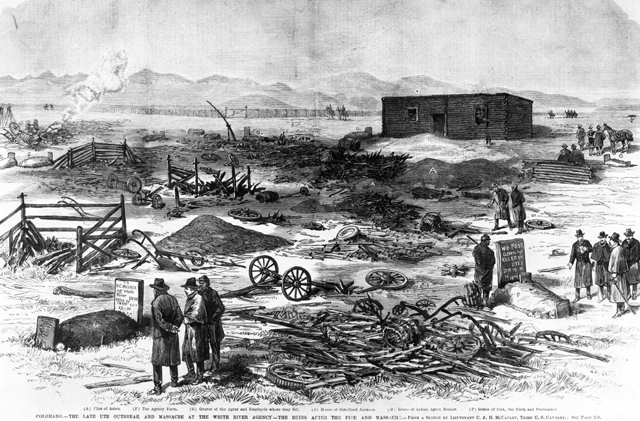
An etching that appeared in the December 6, 1879 edition of Frank Leslie's Illustrated Newspaper depicts the aftermath of the "Meeker Massacre." Meeker grave at lower left; W.H. Post grave at lower right.

The dispute between Meeker and the Utes resulted in a confrontation between Meeker and a Ute leader named "Johnson." Meeker wired for military assistance, after he had been assaulted by an Indian, driven from his home, and severely injured. Meeker requested only a few soldiers come to the agency, but 191 soldiers, led by Major Thomas T. Thornburgh, commander of Fort Steele in Wyoming, advanced toward the agency to settle the affair. The Utes warned Thornburgh and Meeker that the presence of soldiers on the reservation would be an act of war. Meeker requested that Thornburgh halt his advance outside the reservation and proceed to the White River Agency with only five soldiers. However, on orders from his superior, Thornburgh continued his advance onto the Ute Reservation.

On September 29, 1879, the Utes attacked both Thornburgh and Meeker's agency. They set the agency buildings on fire and killed Meeker and the 10 members of his staff. They took five women and children as hostages to secure their own safety as they fled and held them for 23 days. Two of the women taken captive were Meeker's wife Arvilla and daughter Josephine, just graduated from college and working as a teacher and physician.

Thornburgh's soldiers (he was killed) were pinned down in the Battle of Milk Creek until October 5. Reinforced by African-American Buffalo Soldiers and 450 additional cavalry, the soldiers advanced to the White River Agency. They found the bodies of Meeker and his men. Meeker is buried at the Linn Grove Cemetery, Greeley, Weld County, Colorado.

== Legacy and honors ==
- Meeker, Colorado was named after him.
- Mount Meeker, a shorter neighbor to Longs Peak, the tallest mountain in Rocky Mountain National Park, was named for him.
- The Meeker Home Museum is located at 1324 9th Avenue Greeley, Colorado. It was originally Nathan Meeker's home.
- Meeker Elementary School in Greeley, Colorado is named after Nathan Meeker.
- In 1970, he was inducted into the Hall of Great Westerners of the National Cowboy & Western Heritage Museum.
