= White River War =

Part of the American Indian Wars

Meeker Massacre, leading to White River War / Battle of Milk Creek
- Part of the Ute Wars, American Indian Wars
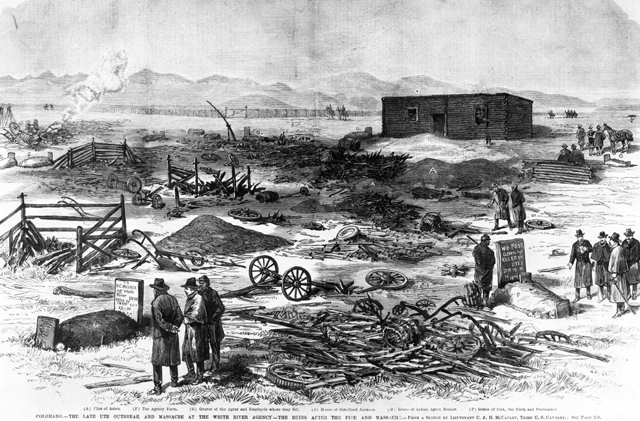
- An etching that appeared in the December 6, 1879 edition of "Frank Leslie's Weekly" depicts the aftermath of the Meeker Massacre. Meeker grave at lower left; W.H. Post grave at lower right
| Date | September 29 – October 5, 1879 |
| Location | White River and Milk Creek, Colorado 40.03°N 107.99°W |

Belligerents
| United States | Ute |

Commanders and leaders
| (United States) Wesley Merritt (United States) Thomas T. Thornburgh † | Chief Douglas; Nicaagat (Jack) |

Strength
| ~700 | ~250 |

Casualties and losses
| 24 killed 44 wounded | 19–37 killed 7 missing |

The Meeker Massacre, or Meeker Incident, White River War, Ute War, or the Ute Campaign), took place on September 29, 1879, in Colorado. Members of a band of Ute Indians (Native Americans) attacked the Indian agency on their reservation, killing the Indian agent Nathan Meeker and his 10 male employees and taking five women and children as hostages. Meeker had been attempting to convert the Utes to Christianity, to make them farmers, and to prevent them from following their migratory culture. On the same day as the massacre, United States Army forces were en route to the Agency from Fort Steele in Wyoming due to threats against Meeker. The Utes attacked U.S. troops led by Major Thomas T. Thornburgh at Milk Creek, 18 miles (29 km) north of present day Meeker, Colorado. They killed the major and 13 troops. Relief troops were called in and the Utes dispersed.

The conflict resulted in the Utes losing most of the lands granted to them by treaty in Colorado, the forced removal of the White River Utes and the Uncompahgre Utes from Colorado, and the reduction in the Southern Utes' land holdings within Colorado. The expulsion of the Utes from Colorado opened up millions of acres of land to pioneer settlement.

== Background ==
In 1879, the Ute Reservation included most of western Colorado and in 1868 had been granted the Utes for their "absolute and undisturbed use and occupation" by a Treaty. The Treaty also stated that the U.S. government would prevent any persons from trespassing on Ute lands without authorization. However, in the 1870s miners encroached upon the Ute Reservation. There was little effort by the U.S. to prevent the encroachment. From 1875 to early fall 1879, members of the 9th Cavalry were the only Army troops near the Reservation. By 1879, most of the 9th Cavalry troops were fighting Apaches in New Mexico in Victorio's War, and only two troops were stationed in Colorado. K Troop was escorting surveyors who were marking the Colorado-Utah border. D Troop patrolled between Fort Lewis and Fort Garland.

In 1878, Nathan Meeker was appointed United States (US) Indian Agent at the White River Ute Indian Reservation, on the western side of the Continental Divide, near the present day town of Meeker, Colorado. He received this appointment even though he lacked experience with Native Americans. While living among the Ute, Meeker tried to impose his policy of religious and farming reforms, but they were used to a hunter-gatherer lifestyle with seasonal bison hunting, as opposed to one which would require them to settle on a particular piece of land. In addition to forcing agriculture on the White River Utes, Meeker had been attempting to convert the White River Utes to Christianity. He angered the Utes by plowing a field they used to graze and race horses.

In addition, Frederick Walker Pitkin, the recently elected Governor of Colorado, had campaigned on a theme of "The Utes Must Go!" The Governor, other local politicians, and settlers made exaggerated claims against the Utes in their efforts to evict them from Colorado.

== The conflicts ==
=== Attack on White River Agency ===
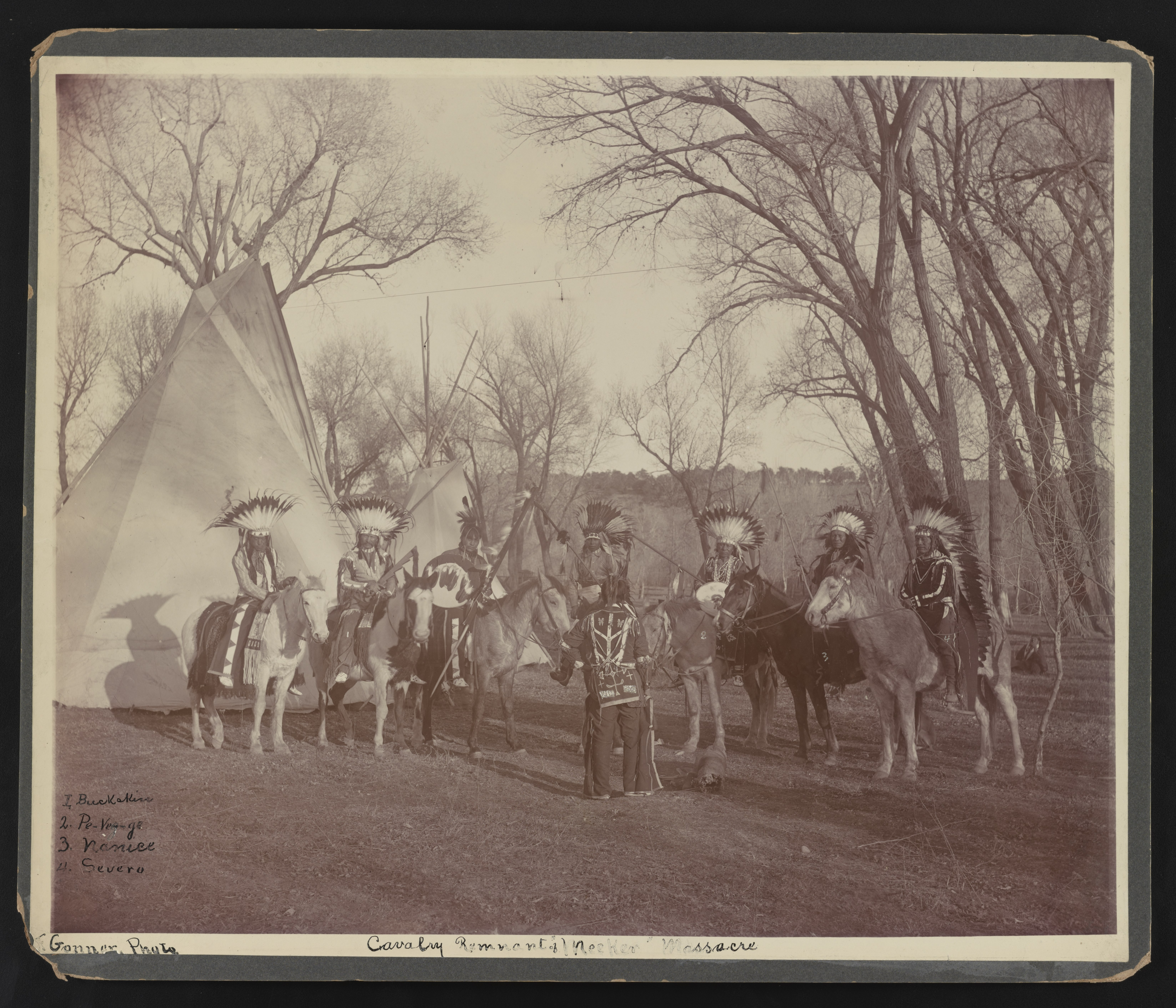
Remnant of "Meeker" massacre 1. Buckskin - 2. Pe-Ve-Ge - 3. Nanice - 4. Severo, photography by F. Gonner

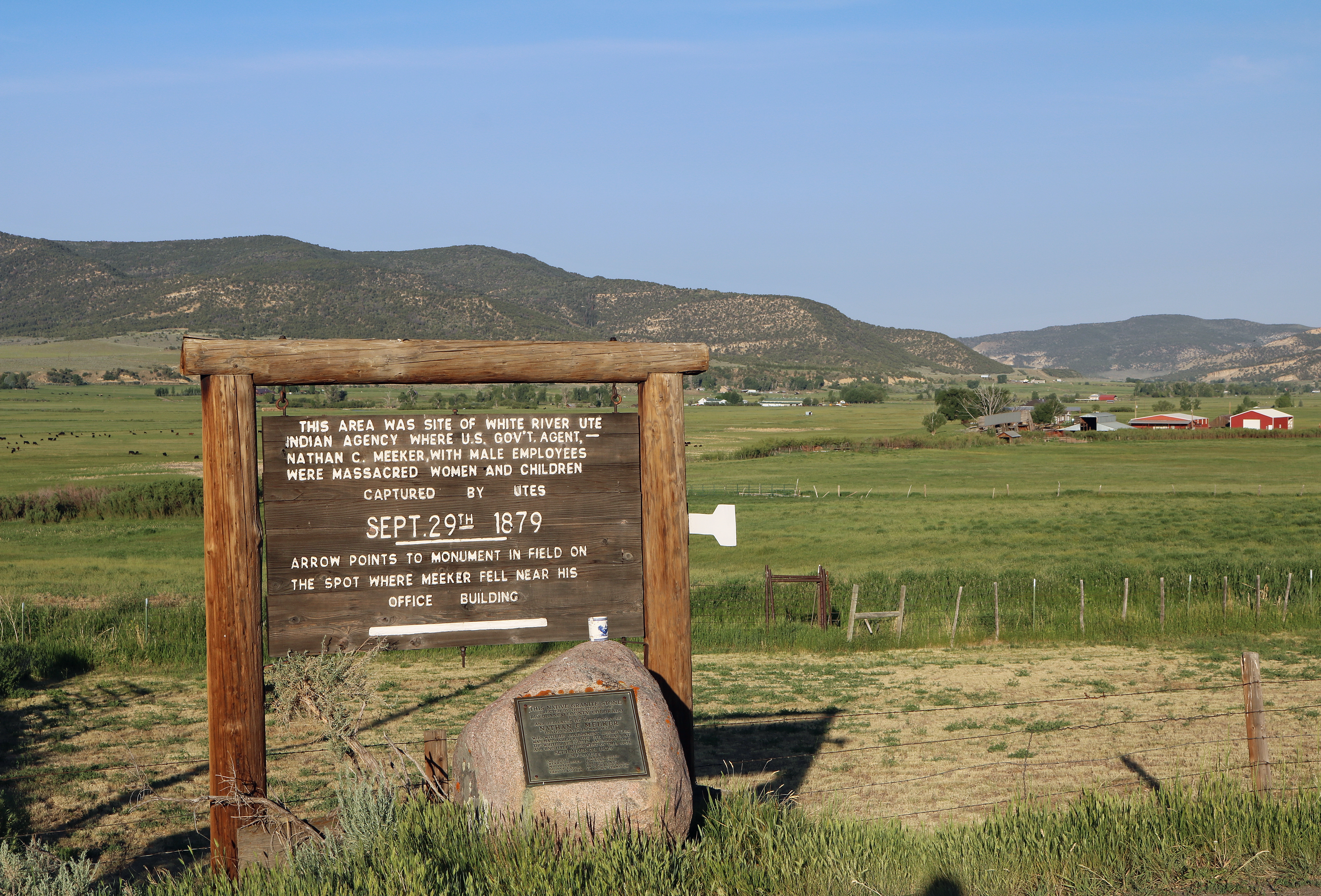
The site of the Meeker massacre.

Nathan Meeker had a tense conversation with an irate Ute chief. This occurred after Meeker began to implore the Utes to change their lifestyle. Meeker wired for military assistance after he had been assaulted by an Indian. Chief Johnson, after hearing about Meeker's orders to plow up the Utes' horse track, went to Meeker's cabin and most likely punched him in the face. Nathan Meeker was not severely injured, but lied in his request for troop assistance.

On September 29, 1879, the Ute defended themselves against the Indian Agency, killing Meeker and ten men working at the Indian Agency. The attack on the Indian Agency occurred almost simultaneously with the Ute ambush of Major Thomas T. Thornburgh's soldiers near Milk Creek. The dead included: Nathan Meeker, Frank Dresser, Henry Dresser, George Eaton, Wilmer E. Eskridge, Carl Goldstein, W.H. Post, Shaduck Price, Fred Shepard, Arthur L Thompson, and "Unknown teamster" [Julius Moore]. Ute members of the raiding party took some women and children as hostages. These hostages were used by the Ute Raiders to bargain with government representatives. The hostages were held by the Ute raiders for 23 days. Two of the women taken captive were of Meeker's family: his wife, Arvilla, and daughter, Josephine, who had just graduated from college and had started working as a teacher and physician.

One Ute woman, Shawsheen, along with her husband, adamantly advocated for the release of the captives and their safety. Josephine Meeker said of her captivity, "We all owe our lives to the sister of Chief Ouray..."

Chief Ouray of the Uncompahgre Ute, who had not been involved in the uprising, attempted to keep the peace after the massacre at the Indian Agency and attack on Army forces. Chief Ouray and his wife, Chipeta, helped negotiate the release of the women and children who had been taken hostage.

=== Attack on U.S. Army troops at Milk Creek ===
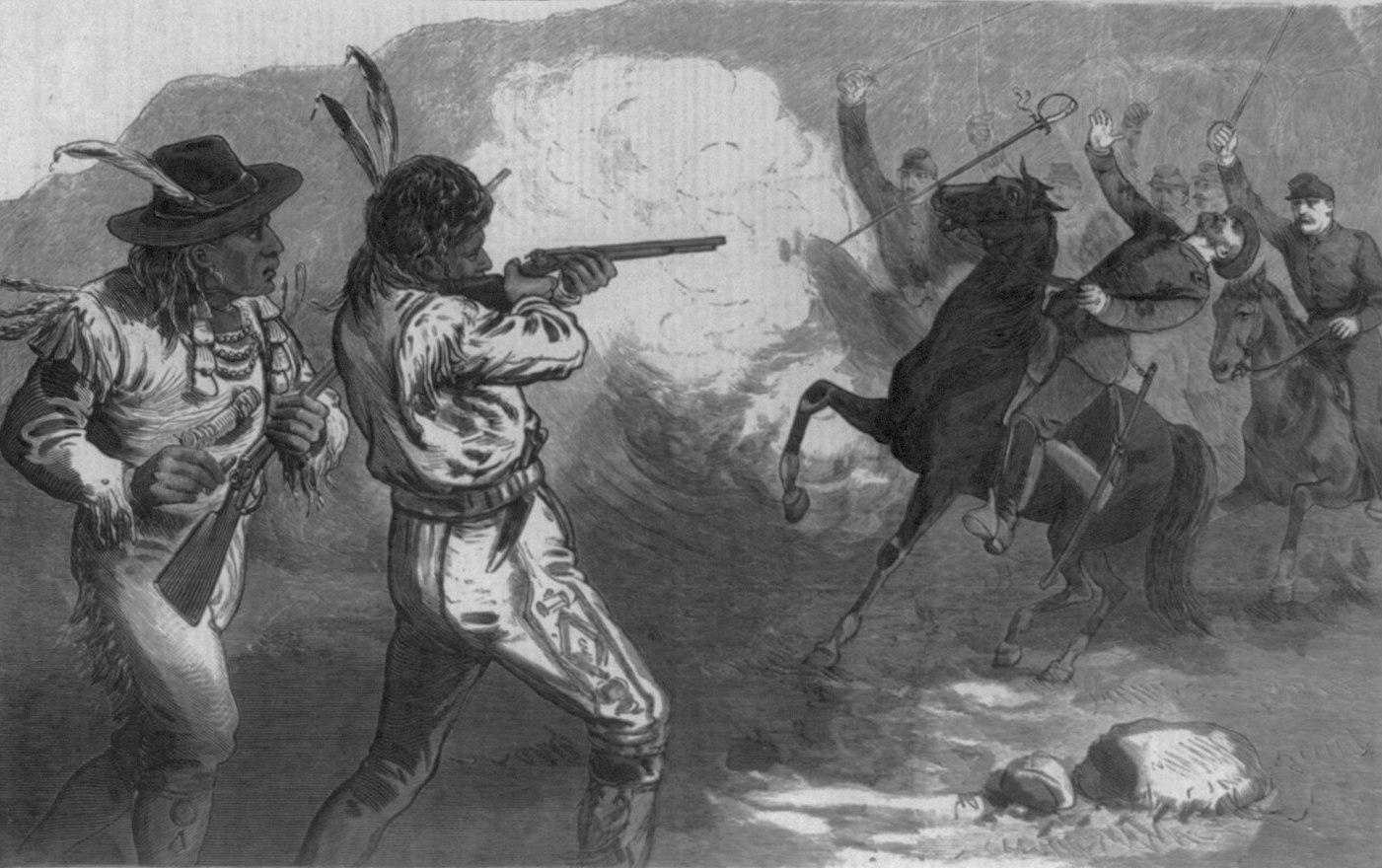
Milk Creek Canyon disaster – death of the gallant Major Thornburgh, of the Fourth United States Infantry, while heading a charge of his men against a band of hostile Ute Indians in their ambuscade.

Major Thomas T. Thornburgh led a command of 153 soldiers, and twenty-five militiamen, to the White River Indian Agency from Fort Steele on September 21, 1879, in response to a request for assistance by the Nathan C. Meeker, U.S. Government Indian Agent. The force consisted of Company E, 3rd Cavalry; D and F Companies, 5th Cavalry; and Company B from Thornburgh's own 4th Infantry.

On September 29, 1879, Ute warriors simultaneously ambushed Thornburgh's forces and, at the Indian Agency, killed Meeker and Meeker's employees. Ute warriors, led by Chief Colorow, attacked Thornburgh's forces at Milk Creek on the northern edge of the reservation, about 18 miles from the White River Indian Agency. Within a few minutes, Major Thornburgh and 13 men were killed, including all his officers above the rank of captain. Another 28 men were wounded. Three-quarters of the horses and mules were killed at leisure by the surrounding Utes. Surviving troops dug in behind the wagon trains and animals' bodies for defense. One man rode hard to get out a request for reinforcements. The US forces held out for several days. Chief Colorow joked with his band of warriors about the smell of dead animals the troops had to endure. The troops were reinforced by 35 African-American cavalrymen known as Buffalo Soldiers from the 9th Cavalry at Fort Lewis in southern Colorado, who got through the enemy lines on October 2. Captain Francis Dodge and Sergeant Henry Johnson were among the reinforcements. Over the next three days, thirty-eight of the forty-two animals that Captain Dodge brought with him were killed, and the other four were wounded. Dodge focused on securing encampment and gathering drinking water. Henry Johnson, who was responsible for the guards in the outposts, made rounds of the outposts under heavy fire to check on his men. In gathering water for the troops from the nearby creek, there were some accounts that the Utes would not shoot at black soldiers.

=== Troops rescued at Milk Creek ===
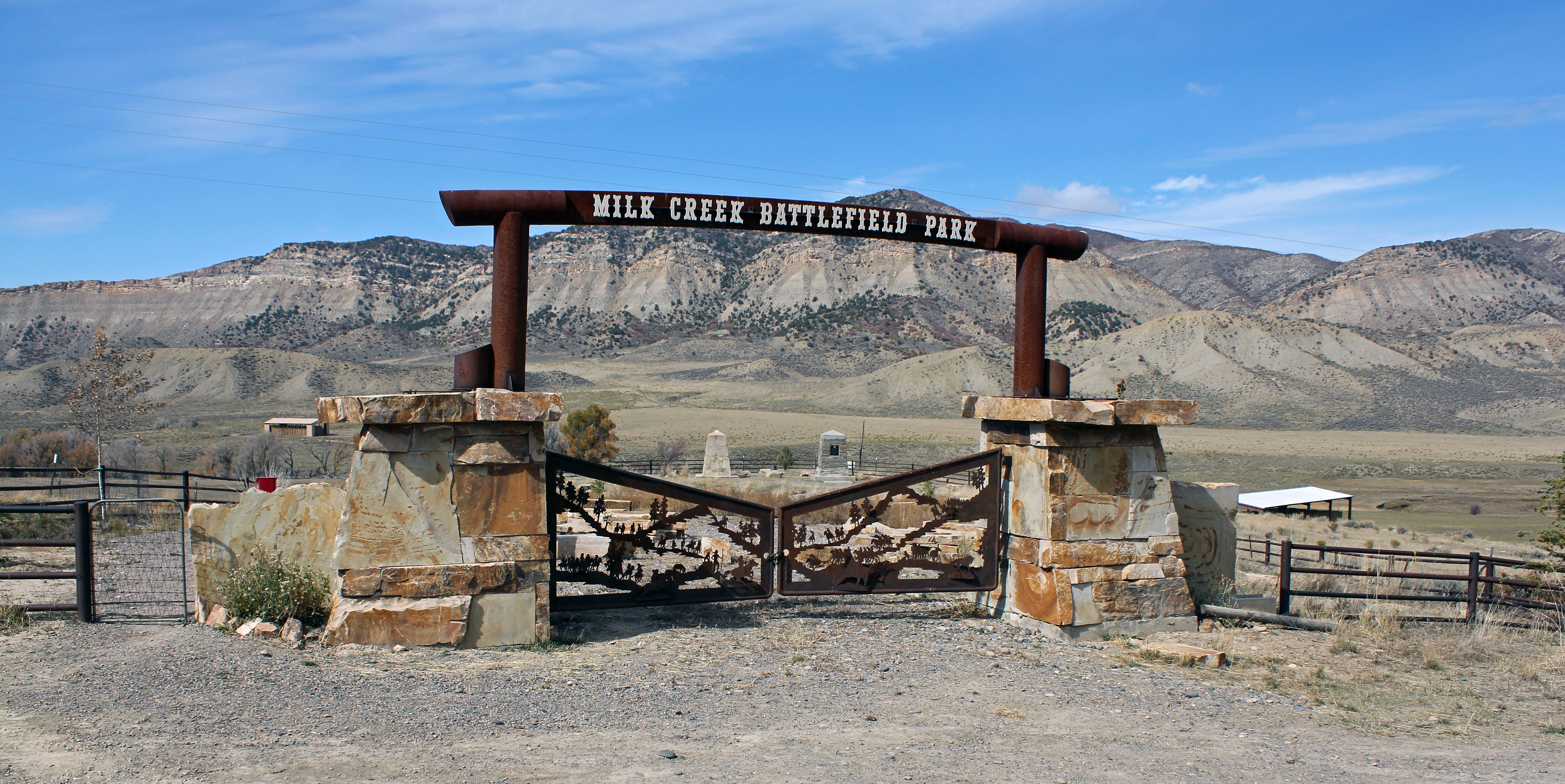
Milk Creek Battlefield Park, 18 miles northeast of Meeker, Colorado

Larger U.S. Army relief columns were sent from two forts, Fort Steele and Fort D.A. Russell. Both forts were established in the adjacent Wyoming Territory after the American Civil War and related to efforts by the Army in the Dakota Territory. Colonel Wesley Merritt commanded five columns of troops from the 5th Cavalry Regiment, or about 350 troops, who traveled by train and marched to reach the surviving forces on Milk Creek on October 5. By the time Colonel Merritt arrived, the Utes had already dispersed. Subsequently, the 9th Cavalry returned to New Mexico to fight Chief Victorio, but the other regiments wintered at the site of the former Indian Agency. In the spring, US Army forces built a Camp on the White River, which the Army occupied until 1883. A few buildings remain of the Army Camp. Several of the Ute escaped and wintered in North Park, where their wickiups still stand.

== Aftermath ==
Meeker and his ten associates were killed. The army and militiamen lost thirteen dead and forty-four wounded, most of them in the first twenty-four hours of the engagement. Eleven soldiers were awarded the Medal of Honor and approximately thirty were decorated for heroic conduct in one of the most decorated battles of the Indian Wars. The Medal of Honor awardees included Sergeant Henry Johnson and Captain Francis Dodge. Chief Jack estimated that nineteen Ute warriors were killed and seven were unaccounted for, though other sources say the Ute lost thirty-seven killed in both the Meeker incident and the battle.

=== Hostility ===
After (and likely before) the Milk Creek and White River incidents, there was intense hostility toward the Utes, both within Colorado and the American army, and mounting pressure to forcefully displace the Ute Tribe entirely from the state, or to murder them altogether. There had already been an agenda to move the Utes off their own native land prior to the outbreak of the war, so the fighting added fuel to the fire and caused the Ute Tribe to defend their home.

=== Initial treaty negotiations ===
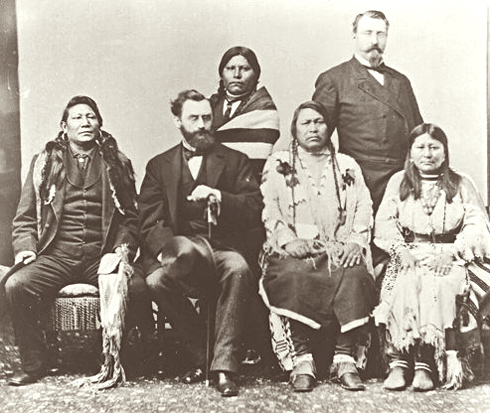
Delegation of Ute Indians in Washington, D.C. in 1880. Background: Woretsiz and General Charles Adams are standing. Front from left to right: Chief Ignatio of the Southern Utes; Secretary of the Interior Carl Schurz; Chief Ouray and his wife Chipeta.

Treaty negotiations were the result of the intercession of Secretary of the Interior Carl Schurz, who stopped any movement of forces against the Ute until such time as the hostages were safely released. Former Indian agent Charles Adams, who had previously served at White River, managed to secure the hostages' release by the White River Utes. (Note: Schurz was accompanied during his trip to Colorado for those negotiations by a young German diplomat named August von Dönhoff, the father of Marion Gräfin Dönhoff, a well known German journalist and Anti-Nazi resistance fighter.) Negotiations began in November 1879 with a Peace Commission at the Los Piños Indian Agency.

=== Ute Removal Act ===
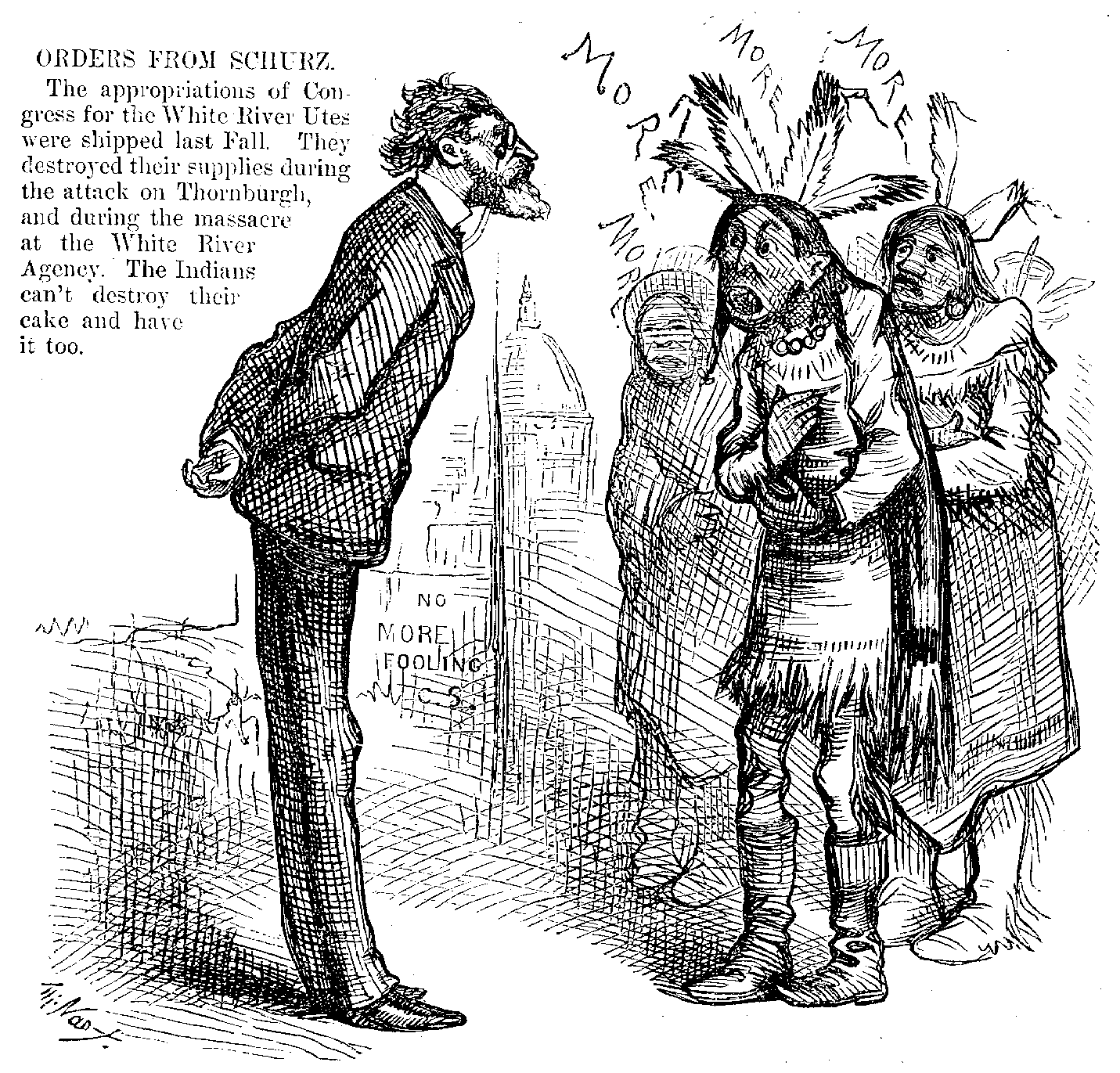
Carl Schurz stands confronting a small band of Utes who are collectively saying "More." A note in the upper left-hand corner says "ORDERS FROM SCHURZ." Illustration is dated to February 28, 1880.

After this commission failed to produce results, Congress summoned the participants to Washington in 1880. A treaty was agreed upon where the White River Utes agreed to be forcefully removed from their home to Uintah Reservation in Utah, and the Uncompahgre Utes, who had not participated in the uprising, were to remain in Colorado, but on a smaller parcel of land. However, later this plan was changed to better suit the settlers, and the Uncompahgre Utes were also nonconsensually forced out of their homeland to Utah instead. The Ute Removal Act denied the Ute 12 million acres (49,000 km^{2}) of land that had formerly been guaranteed to them in perpetuity. Congress insisted that the Utes be forcibly removed from the "Shining Mountains" and relocated to eastern Utah. The Southern Ute were also to be moved, although it proved difficult to find them land in neighboring states. Ultimately, they remained on a reservation along the border of Colorado and New Mexico.

After forcibly removing, the Uncompahgre Utes named their new land reserve Ouray Reservation after the late Chief Ouray, who died in August 1880, occurred on August 28, 1881. The Uncompahgres were moved under the accompaniment of the army, commanded by Colonel Ranald MacKenzie. The army was used to force the Utes to move out of their home, but also "served to protect" the Utes from the wrath of the settlers who followed the exodus of the Uncompahgres.

The White River Utes were more difficult to move from their own home. The Indian Bureau lured them to the Uintah Reservation by sending their rations and small land compensation payments there. The White River Utes remained largely nomadic, and remained a "threat" to return to their home of Colorado. For that reason, the army, with the aid of the Department of the Interior, planned a military post next to the Utah reservations. When Chief Jack and the White River Utes fled back to Colorado, the army tracked down and located them on April 28, 1882. Soldiers murdered him while he was trying to avoid capture and being forced to return to Uintah Reservation. The removal of the Utes from most of their homelands in Colorado effectively marked the end of the White River War.

== See also ==
- List of battles fought in Colorado
