= Fort Fred Steele State Historic Site =

- Fort Steele
- U.S. National Register of Historic Places
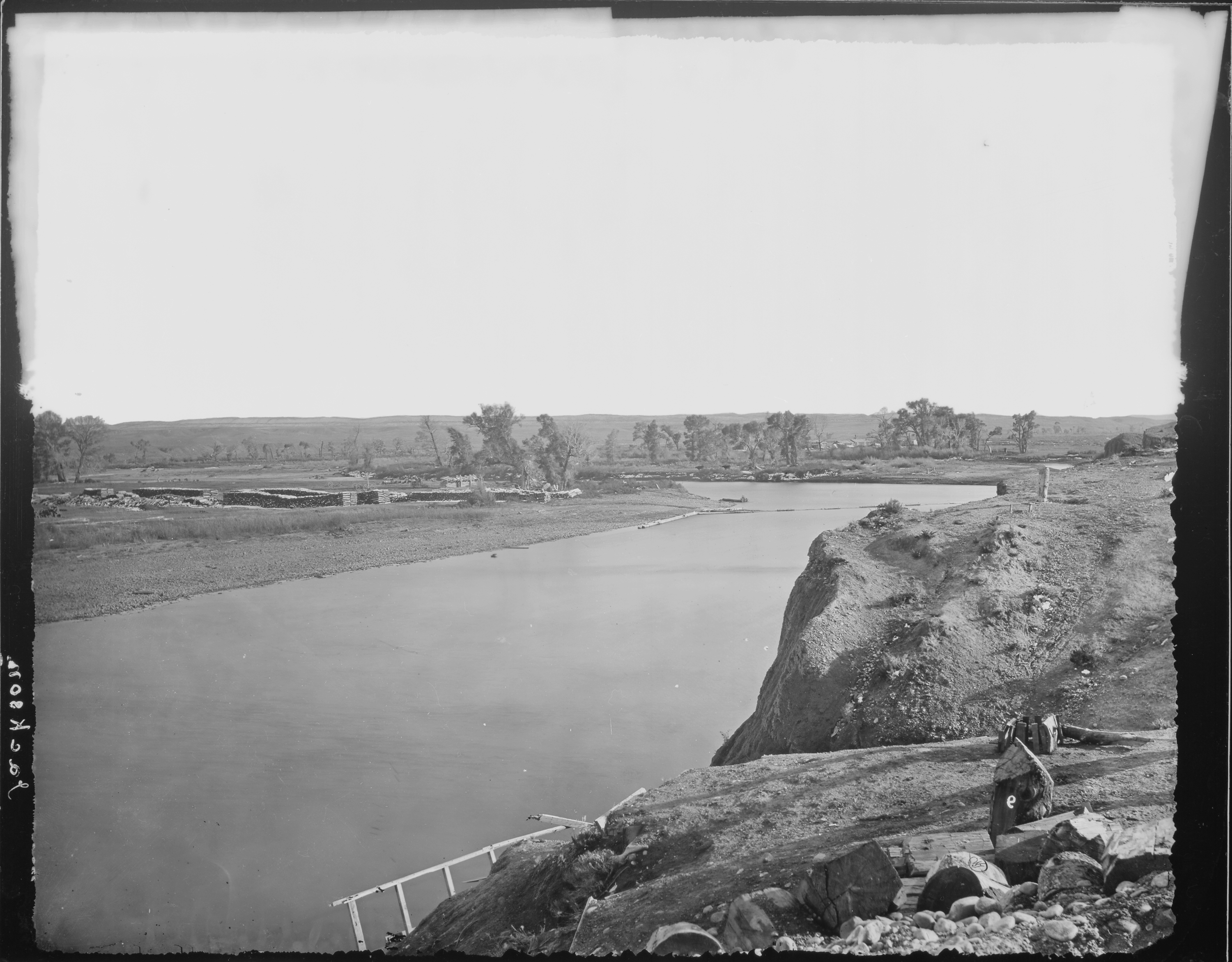

- Location within Wyoming Location within the United States
- Location: North Platte River at the Union Pacific Railroad crossing
- Nearest city: Sinclair, Wyoming
- Coordinates: 41°46′42″N 106°56′51″W
- Area: 40 acres (16 ha)
- Built: 1868
- NRHP reference No.: 69000185
- Added to NRHP: April 16, 1969

Fort Steele, also known as Fort Fred Steele, was established to protect the newly built Union Pacific Railroad from attacks by Native Americans during construction of the transcontinental railroad in the United States. The fort was built in 1868 where the railroad crossed the North Platte River in Carbon County, Wyoming. Work on the fort was carried out by military and civilian labor. Fort Steele was one of three forts built on the line. Fort Sanders (originally Fort John Buford) near Laramie and Fort D.A. Russell at Cheyenne were the other railroad forts. Fort Steele was named for the recently deceased General Frederick Steele.

== History ==
Immediately after the fort's establishment in the summer of 1868 it was the scene of a meeting that included Generals Ulysses S. Grant and William Tecumseh Sherman, who had come west to inspect the railroad, accompanied by Generals Philip Sheridan, August Kautz, Joseph H. Potter, William S. Harney, Frederick T. Dent and Adam J. Slemmer, with Union Pacific officials Thomas C. Durant and Sidney Dillon. The fort provided both military protection and law enforcement for the region. Troops from the fort also dealt with labor disputes in Wyoming and as far away as Chicago. The most notable incident occurred in 1878 during the White River War, when the fort sent a contingent that was ambushed with heavy losses in the Battle of Milk Creek. Casualties included the fort's commander, Major Thomas Thornburgh.

The fort was abandoned in 1886. The fort's structures have suffered from repeated fires. It was listed on the National Register of Historic Places on April 16, 1969. It is now managed as Fort Fred Steele State Historic Site by the state of Wyoming.

== See also ==
- List of the oldest buildings in Wyoming
- Wyoming Historical Landmarks
- Carbon County, Wyoming monuments and markers
