= Gunnison Valley High School =

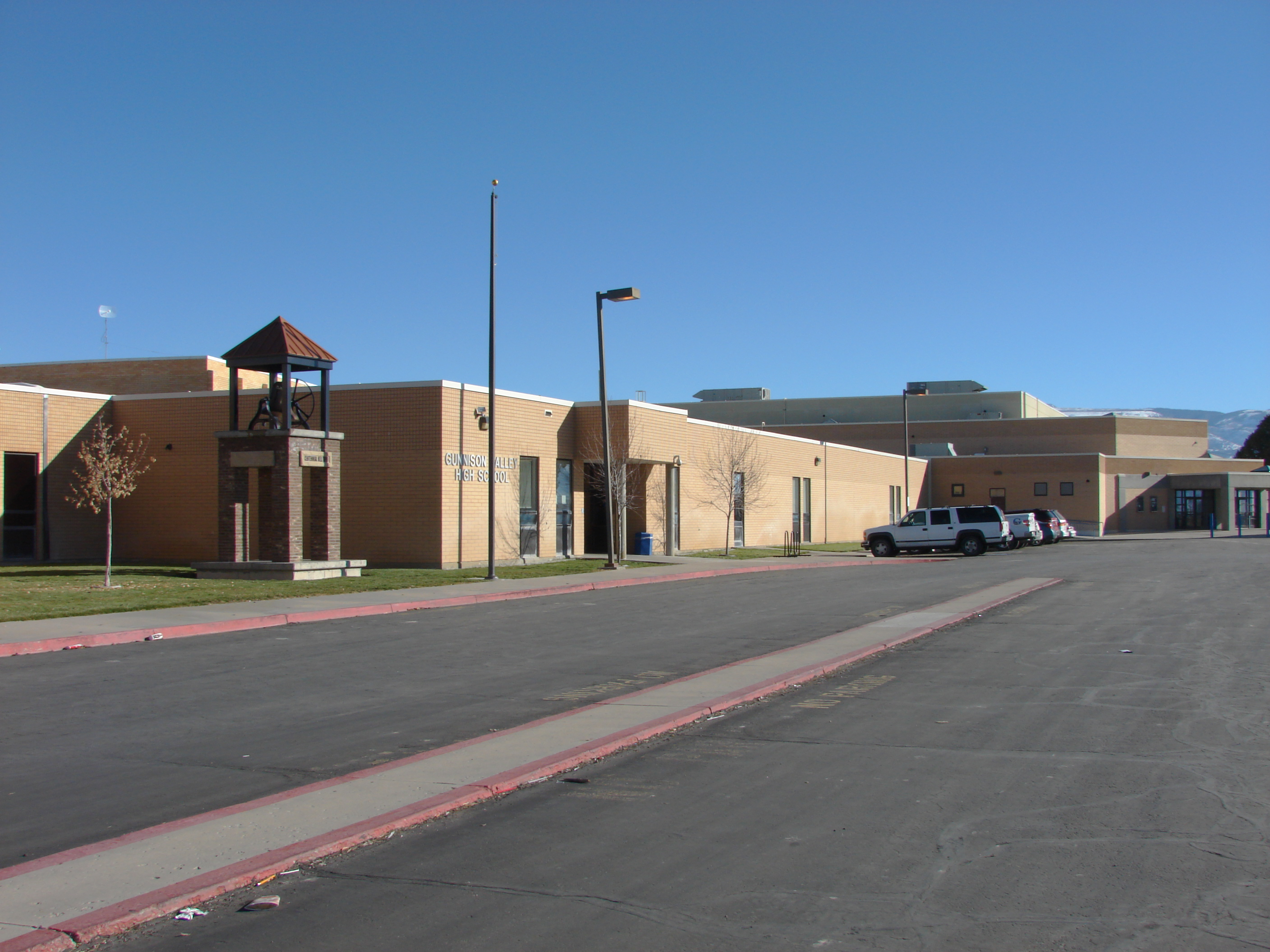

Location
- 35 East 600 South; Gunnison, Sanpete, Utah 84634; United States; 39°08′34″N 111°48′40″W

Information
- Motto: "Some Dream... We Achieve"
- School district: South Sanpete School District
- Principal: Eugene King
- Teaching staff: 21.89 (FTE)
- Grades: 9–12
- Enrollment: 319 (2024-2025)
- Student to teacher ratio: 14.57
- Colors: Blue and white
- Mascot: Bulldog
- Newspaper: Gunnison Giddyup
- Website: Official website

Gunnison Valley High School (GVHS) is a public high school located in Gunnison, Sanpete County, Utah, United States. Part of the South Sanpete School District, it was built to serve students in the cities of Gunnison, Centerfield, Fayette, Mayfield, and Axtell. Its mascot is the Bulldog. The official school colors are blue and white. As of 2021, its principal is Eugene King.
