= Oberg-Metcalf House =

- U.S. National Register of Historic Places
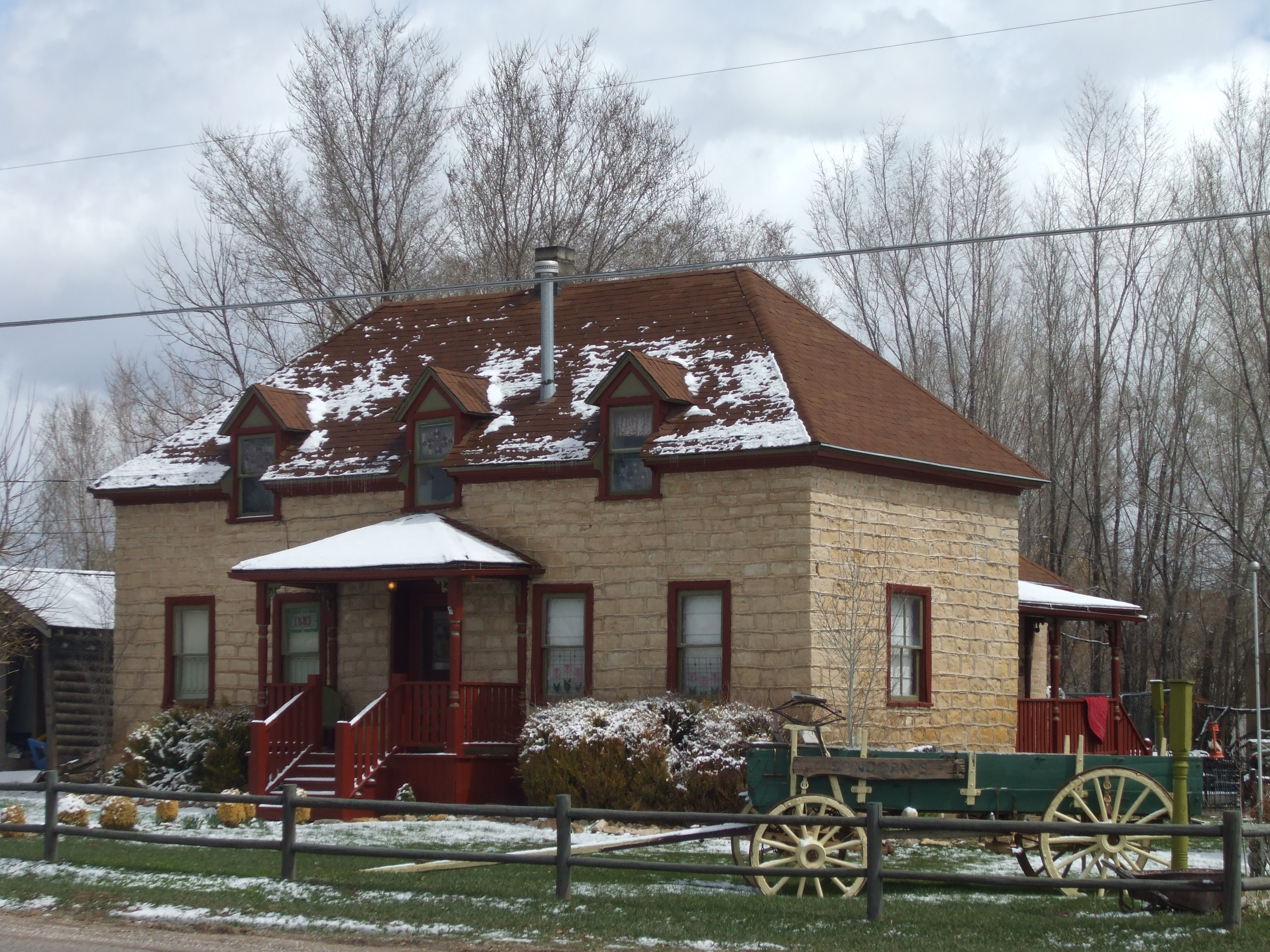

- Location within Utah Location within the United States
- Location: 12 N 100 E, Gunnison, Utah
- Coordinates: 39°09′19″N 111°49′05″W
- Area: 0.5 hectares (1.2 acres)
- Built: c.1880, c.1890s
- Built by: Oberg, Johan
- Architectural style: Classical Revival, Victorian
- NRHP reference No.: 97001464
- Added to NRHP: November 24, 1997

The Oberg-Metcalf House, at 12 N 100 E in Gunnison, Utah, in Sanpete County, Utah, was built around 1880 and expanded with a rear ell in the 1890s. It was listed on the National Register of Historic Places in 1997.

It was probably built by Johan Oberg, about whom not much is known, and it was sold by his daughter, Agnes Alexsandra Giles, in 1905. By 1909 it was home of Sylvia Eliza Sanford Metcalf and her husband Anthony Metcalf. Sylvia was born November 16, 1845, in Hancock County, Illinois, and came with her parents to Utah in Captain Snow's Company in 1850. Anthony was born in Belfast, Ireland on September 5, 1843, and came to Utah in 1853 with the Claudis Spencer Company. In 1866 Anthony and Sylvia moved to Warm Creek (now Fayette, Utah) in Sanpete County; Anthony operated a flour mill there.

The house appears to have fulfilled Brigham Young's proscription to build well, if you are going to build a house. This one, along with others built during the later settlement period in the Sanpete Valley, reflected Classical style plus local materials to make a harmonious whole.

It is a one-and-one-half story cross-wing house. Its original 1880s hall and parlor plan unit was built of local oolitic limestone. Its foundation of same is covered by concrete. Classical features of the house include its symmetrical facade, its simple cornice, and the raised mortar joints in its coursed ashlar stone walls. The Victorian extension to the rear, in the 1890s, was built of bricks.

The house was deemed significant "as one of only ten remaining Classically detailed stone residences built prior to 1900 in Gunnison. The Victorian detailed rear ell contributes to the significance of the house by describing a period when rural Utah was becoming less isolated and pattern book designs and manufactured materials were more readily available."
