= List of municipalities in Utah =

List of municipalities in the U.S. state of Utah

Map of the United States with Utah highlighted

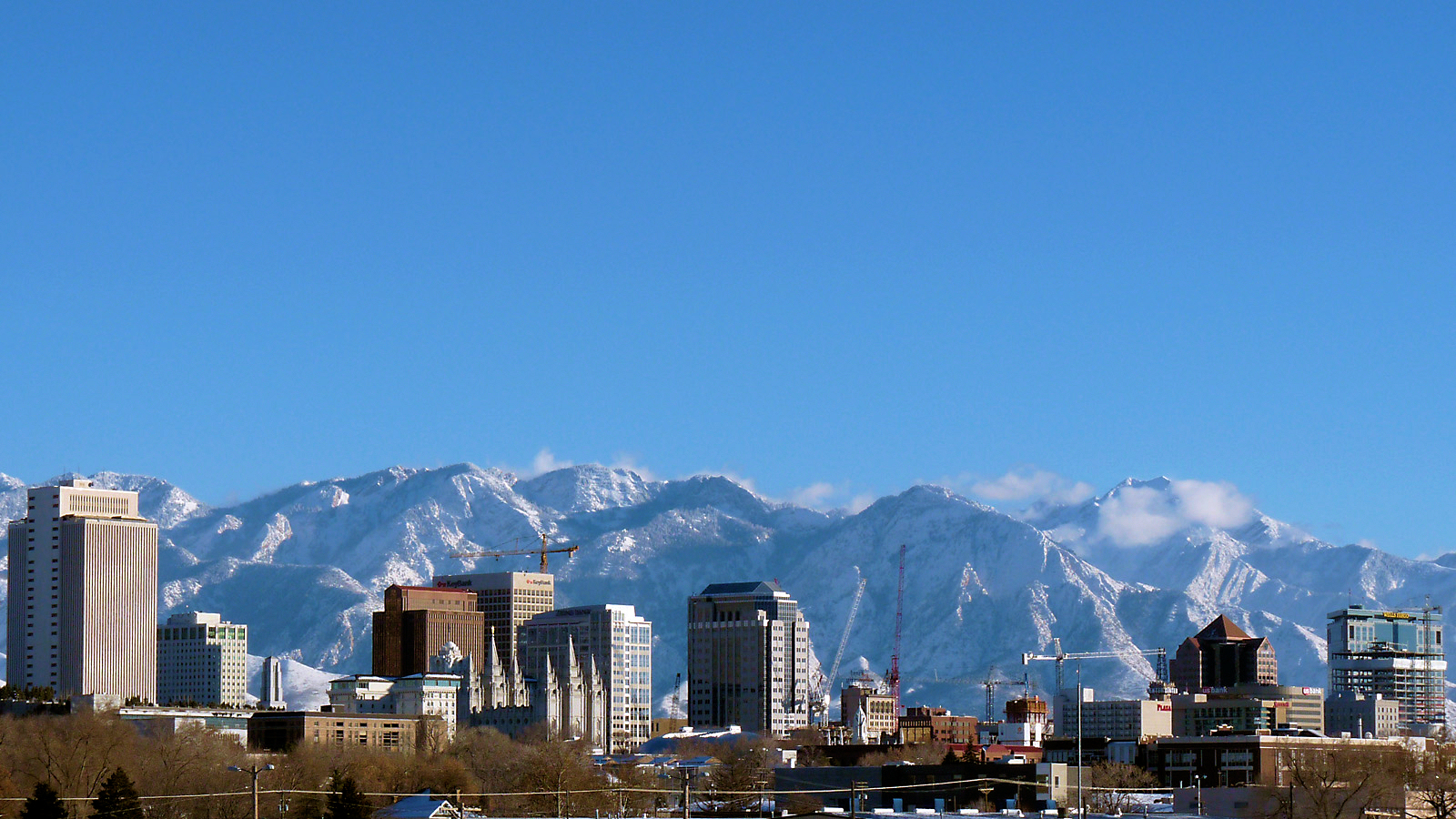
Salt Lake City is the capital and largest city in Utah.

Utah is a state located in the Western United States. As of 2025, there are 255 municipalities in the U.S. state of Utah. A municipality is called a town if the population is under 1,000 people, and a city if the population is over 1,000 people. Incorporation means that a municipal charter has been adopted by the affected population following a referendum. In the Constitution of Utah, cities and towns are granted "the authority to exercise all powers relating to municipal affairs, and to adopt and enforce within its limits, local police, sanitary and similar regulations not in conflict with the general law" They also have the power to raise and collect taxes, to provide and maintain local public services, acquire by eminent domain any property needed to make local improvements, and to raise money by bonds.

The area had been occupied by different Native American groups dating to about 10,000 years before present. Europeans entered the region in the 1500s with the expedition of Garci-Lopez de Cardenas, as recorded by Francisco de Coronado, and in subsequent decades other Europeans had a scattered presence as mountain men or explorers but there were no large or permanent settlements. Utah was colonized by the Spanish Empire as part of the Province of Las Californias, and later Alta California. After Mexico gained independence from Spain in 1821, Utah was under Mexican control until the Treaty of Guadalupe Hidalgo in 1848 ceded the territory to the United States of America. The Spanish and Mexican legacy of the state is present in many place names, particularly in the southern portion of Utah. On July 22, 1847, the first party of Latter-day Saint pioneers arrived in the Salt Lake Valley, where they founded Salt Lake City. Over the next 22 years, more than 70,000 Mormon pioneers crossed the plains and settled in Utah. Initial colonization along the Wasatch Front was mostly made by members of the Church of Jesus Christ of Latter-day Saints (LDS Church), with little direct involvement from LDS leadership. Outside the Wasatch Front, many settlements were directed, planned, organized, and dispatched by leaders of the Church. Settlements were also founded by the railroads, mining companies and non-LDS settlers. Many settlements were named after leaders, history or from scriptures of the LDS Church. Natural features of the region, including rivers, mountains, lakes and flora, are also commonly used for names.

The 2023 American Community Survey estimate puts 3,128,845 of the state's 3,331,190 residents within these cities and towns, accounting for 94% of the population. Just over 75% of Utah's population is concentrated in the four Wasatch Front counties of Salt Lake, Utah, Davis, and Weber. The largest city is the state's capital of Salt Lake City with a population of about 208,000 and the former coal mining town of Scofield is the smallest town with 33 people.

In 2015, a new form of local government, the metro township, was created. Five unincorporated townships in Salt Lake County voted to incorporate as metro townships, allowing them to elect councils and manage a budget, but they must contract with other cities for municipal services and have limited taxation powers. In 2024, the five metro townships, Kearns, Magna, Copperton, Emigration Canyon and White City, became incorporated cities through H.B. 35 in the 2024 general session of the Utah Legislature.

== List ==
and * symbol indicates that this city or town is the county seat of its respective county.

Name	County	Type	Population (2023)	Area (2020)	Elevation	Year settled	Median household income (Note: Margin of error based on 90% confidence interval.) (2023)	Etymology
Alpine	Utah	City	10,272	7.96 sq mi (20.6 km^{2})	4,951 feet (1,509 m)	1850	$156,786 (±$24,200)	Adjacent high mountains of the Wasatch Mountains and Traverse Mountains
Alta	Salt Lake	Town	337	4.56 sq mi (11.8 km^{2})	8,560 feet (2,610 m)	1866	(Note: Insufficient sample size for reporting)	Spanish word for "high" due to Alta's elevation
Altamont	Duchesne	Town	390	0.21 sq mi (0.54 km^{2})	6,388 feet (1,947 m)	1953	$88,750 (±$34,784)	Composite name of nearby peaks Altonah and Mt. Emmons
Alton	Kane	Town	308	2.29 sq mi (5.9 km^{2})	7,041 feet (2,146 m)	1865		Altafjord in Norway
Amalga	Cache	Town	486	3.49 sq mi (9.0 km^{2})	4,439 feet (1,353 m)	1860	$98,438 (±$28,224)	Amalgamated Sugar Company
American Fork	Utah	City	35,312	11.20 sq mi (29.0 km^{2})	4,606 feet (1,404 m)	1850	$95,823 (±$8,500)	American Fork (river), a tributary of Utah Lake
Annabella	Sevier	Town	719	0.65 sq mi (1.7 km^{2})	5,292 feet (1,613 m)	1871	$73,750 (±$19,656)	Composite name of Ann S. Roberts and Isabella Dalton, woman settlers of Annabella
Antimony	Garfield	Town	82	9.82 sq mi (25.4 km^{2})	6,453 feet (1,967 m)	1873	$46,250 (±$5,654)	The metal antimony that was mined in the area
Apple Valley	Washington	Town	1,399	39.74 sq mi (102.9 km^{2})	4,941 feet (1,506 m)	2004	$89,375 (±$26,209)	(Note: No known source on how the city or town received its name)
Aurora	Sevier	City	881	0.92 sq mi (2.4 km^{2})	5,200 feet (1,600 m)	1875	$92,321 (±$15,335)	Aurora, the Roman goddess of dawn
Ballard	Uintah	Town	1,648	13.98 sq mi (36.2 km^{2})	5,049 feet (1,539 m)	1905	$81,250 (±$8,593)	Melvin J. Ballard, a LDS Church Apostle
Bear River City	Box Elder	City	863	1.80 sq mi (4.7 km^{2})	4,258 feet (1,298 m)	1866	$87,917 (±$16,422)	Bear River, a 350-mile (560 km) river and largest tributary of the Great Salt Lake
Beaver*	Beaver	City	3,632	6.68 sq mi (17.3 km^{2})	5,902 feet (1,799 m)	1856	$82,625 (±$21,660)	Beaver River, a 242-mile (389 km) river that eventually disappears into the ground
Bicknell	Wayne	Town	383	0.57 sq mi (1.5 km^{2})	7,123 feet (2,171 m)	1879	$71,563 (±$37,557)	Thomas W. Bicknell, who donated 500 books to the library
Big Water	Kane	Town	520	5.99 sq mi (15.5 km^{2})	4,108 feet (1,252 m)	1958	$45,625 (±$28,171)	
Blanding	San Juan	City	3,303	13.18 sq mi (34.1 km^{2})	6,106 feet (1,861 m)	1887	$63,333 (±$15,787)	Maiden name of the wife of Thomas W. Bicknell, who donated 500 books to the library
Bluff	San Juan	Town	179	36.47 sq mi (94.5 km^{2})	4,324 feet (1,318 m)	1880	$53,973 (±$18,616)	The bluffs along the San Juan River
Bluffdale	Salt Lake/Utah	City	18,168	11.14 sq mi (28.9 km^{2})	4,436 feet (1,352 m)	1886	$122,879 (±$8,780)	The bluffs along the Jordan River
Boulder	Garfield	Town	389	20.93 sq mi (54.2 km^{2})	6,703 feet (2,043 m)	1889	$50,450 (±$21,720)	Boulder Mountain, a 11,317-foot (3,449 m) mountain located in the Dixie National Forest
Bountiful	Davis	City	45,093	13.19 sq mi (34.2 km^{2})	4,797 feet (1,462 m)	1847	$103,723 (±$7,785)	The Book of Mormon city of Bountiful
Brian Head	Iron	Town	49	3.65 sq mi (9.5 km^{2})	9,800 feet (3,000 m)	1975	$64,643 (±$41,827)	William Jennings Bryan, national politician and former candidate for President of the United States
Brigham City*	Box Elder	City	19,796	24.58 sq mi (63.7 km^{2})	4,436 feet (1,352 m)	1850	$66,435 (±$6,018)	Brigham Young, LDS Church President and first territorial Governor of Utah
Brighton	Salt Lake	Town	353	15.77 sq mi (40.8 km^{2})	8,707 feet (2,654 m)	1871	$143,563 (±$4,781)	Brighton, England
Bryce Canyon City	Garfield	Town	216	3.35 sq mi (8.7 km^{2})	7,664 feet (2,336 m)	1875		Local homesteader Ebenezer Bryce
Cannonville	Garfield	Town	226	2.57 sq mi (6.7 km^{2})	5,886 feet (1,794 m)	1874	$29,079 (±$12,951)	George Q. Cannon, a LDS Church Apostle
Castle Dale*	Emery	City	1,463	2.23 sq mi (5.8 km^{2})	5,676 feet (1,730 m)	1879	$69,821 (±$18,344)	Located in the Castle Valley, but a Postal Service mistake listed town as Castle Dale instead of Castle Vale.
Castle Valley	Grand	Town	348	9.28 sq mi (24.0 km^{2})	4,685 feet (1,428 m)	1974	$44,464 (±$11,188)	Located in the Castle Valley
Cedar City	Iron	City	37,202	35.86 sq mi (92.9 km^{2})	5,846 feet (1,782 m)	1851	$63,789 (±$4,203)	Large number of juniper trees, known as "cedars"
Cedar Fort	Utah	Town	174	21.38 sq mi (55.4 km^{2})	5,085 feet (1,550 m)	1856	$102,500 (±$18,693)	Large number of juniper trees in the area, known as "cedars"
Cedar Hills	Utah	City	9,945	2.73 sq mi (7.1 km^{2})	4,957 feet (1,511 m)	1977	$137,527 (±$12,821)	Local juniper-covered hills
Centerfield	Sanpete	City	1,312	1.91 sq mi (4.9 km^{2})	5,098 feet (1,554 m)	1869	$83,281 (±$23,561)	Center of the Gunnison Valley
Centerville	Davis	City	16,692	5.96 sq mi (15.4 km^{2})	4,377 feet (1,334 m)	1848	$117,831 (±$8,327)	Center between Farmington and Bountiful
Central Valley	Sevier	Town	686	2.11 sq mi (5.5 km^{2})	5,305 feet (1,617 m)	1873	$89,583 (±$24,786)	
Charleston	Wasatch	Town	484	2.86 sq mi (7.4 km^{2})	5,440 feet (1,660 m)	1852	$93,875 (±$28,607)	Charles Shelton, who surveyed the town
Circleville	Piute	Town	431	11.04 sq mi (28.6 km^{2})	6,066 feet (1,849 m)	1864	$74,375 (±$16,359)	Located in the Circle Valley
Clarkston	Cache	Town	596	0.93 sq mi (2.4 km^{2})	4,879 feet (1,487 m)	1864	$65,625 (±$23,695)	Justus Clark, an original settler.
Clawson	Emery	Town	94	1.01 sq mi (2.6 km^{2})	5,942 feet (1,811 m)	1897	$62,188 (±$24,001)	Rudger Clawson, a LDS Church Apostle
Clearfield	Davis	City	32,895	7.71 sq mi (20.0 km^{2})	4,465 feet (1,361 m)	1877	$75,429 (±$5,825)	The open surroundings of the area
Cleveland	Emery	Town	429	0.87 sq mi (2.3 km^{2})	5,722 feet (1,744 m)	1885	$92,589 (±$42,848)	Grover Cleveland, President of the United States
Clinton	Davis	City	23,492	5.93 sq mi (15.4 km^{2})	4,393 feet (1,339 m)	1936	$109,915 (±$6,192)	
Coalville*	Summit	City	1,915	6.23 sq mi (16.1 km^{2})	5,577 feet (1,700 m)	1858	$85,921 (±$11,071)	Many of the miners came from Coalville, England
Copperton	Salt Lake	City	865	0.31 sq mi (0.80 km^{2})	5,643 feet (1,720 m)	1926	$77,778 (±$14,131)	Company town for the Utah Copper Company
Corinne	Box Elder	Town	836	3.78 sq mi (9.8 km^{2})	4,226 feet (1,288 m)	1869	$74,844 (±$11,899)	Corinne, the first child born in the area
Cornish	Cache	Town	236	5.39 sq mi (14.0 km^{2})	4,485 feet (1,367 m)	1937	$87,500 (±$38,722)	William D. Cornish, vice-president of the Union Pacific Railroad
Cottonwood Heights	Salt Lake	City	32,984	9.23 sq mi (23.9 km^{2})	4,823 feet (1,470 m)	1848	$116,583 (±$9,183)	Cottonwood trees found in the area
Daniel	Wasatch	Town	956	3.29 sq mi (8.5 km^{2})	5,715 feet (1,742 m)	1874	$113,438 (±$26,796)	Aaron Daniels, one of the first settlers
Delta	Millard	City	3,675	8.60 sq mi (22.3 km^{2})	4,639 feet (1,414 m)	1906	$73,224 (±$5,051)	The river delta of the Sevier River
Deweyville	Box Elder	Town	345	6.38 sq mi (16.5 km^{2})	4,437 feet (1,352 m)	1864	$87,500 (±$19,879)	John C. Dewey, an early settler to the area
Draper	Salt Lake/ Utah	City	50,159	29.95 sq mi (77.6 km^{2})	4,505 feet (1,373 m)	1849	$130,680 (±$3,716)	William Draper, the town's first LDS Church Bishop
Duchesne*	Duchesne	City	1,744	2.80 sq mi (7.3 km^{2})	5,518 feet (1,682 m)	1904	$78,854 (±$10,219)	Nearby Fort Duchesne
Dutch John	Daggett	Town	17	5.90 sq mi (15.3 km^{2})	6,430 feet (1,960 m)	1957		Dutch John's name came from John Honselena, often mispronounced “Hunslinger”, who was actually a native of Sheiswig (Schleswig), Germany
Eagle Mountain	Utah	City	49,514	50.43 sq mi (130.6 km^{2})	4,882 feet (1,488 m)	1996	$105,576 (±$3,018)	Eagle Mountain Properties, the development company of the city
East Carbon	Carbon	City	1,476	11.29 sq mi (29.2 km^{2})	4,987 feet (1,520 m)	1922	$40,114 (±$17,376)	Coal deposits found in the area
Elk Ridge	Utah	City	4,782	2.82 sq mi (7.3 km^{2})	5,354 feet (1,632 m)	1976	$138,587 (±$27,163)	
Elmo	Emery	Town	433	0.71 sq mi (1.8 km^{2})	5,692 feet (1,735 m)	1908	$52,143 (±$23,933)	A combination of the first letters of each name from the original settlers. Erickson, Larsen, Mortensen, Oviatt
Elsinore	Sevier	Town	760	1.34 sq mi (3.5 km^{2})	5,351 feet (1,631 m)	1874	$67,708 (±$18,871)	Elsinore, Denmark
Elwood	Box Elder	Town	1,643	8.06 sq mi (20.9 km^{2})	4,298 feet (1,310 m)	1879	$99,375 (±$8,082)	Postal Service named the town
Emery	Emery	Town	521	1.23 sq mi (3.2 km^{2})	6,253 feet (1,906 m)	1881	$75,000 (±$35,268)	George W. Emery, territorial Governor of Utah
Emigration Canyon	Salt Lake	City	1,465	18.22 sq mi (47.2 km^{2})		1846	$184,722 (±$53,524)	
Enoch	Iron	City	7,856	7.84 sq mi (20.3 km^{2})	5,545 feet (1,690 m)	1851	$81,767 (±$11,218)	Enoch, a biblical figure in the Old Testament
Enterprise	Washington	City	1,543	8.74 sq mi (22.6 km^{2})	5,318 feet (1,621 m)	1902	$72,407 (±$18,795)	Name reflected the first settlers' ability to adjust to problem experienced by the first settlers
Ephraim	Sanpete	City	5,805	4.45 sq mi (11.5 km^{2})	5,541 feet (1,689 m)	1854	$71,661 (±$11,806)	Tribe of Ephraim, one of the twelve Tribes of Israel.
Erda	Tooele	City	3,294	22.5 sq mi (58 km^{2})	4,344 feet (1,324 m)	1852	$153,068 (±$16,118)	Erda is a German word that means earth
Escalante	Garfield	City	625	3.30 sq mi (8.5 km^{2})	5,820 feet (1,770 m)	1876	$44,048 (±$20,414)	Silvestre Vélez de Escalante, a Franciscan missionary who explored the area in 1776
Eureka	Juab	City	941	1.48 sq mi (3.8 km^{2})	6,430 feet (1,960 m)	1869	$70,938 (±$10,009)	Eureka is the ancient Greek name for "I have found it", relating to the gold mines found in the area
Fairfield	Utah	Town	147	26.09 sq mi (67.6 km^{2})	4,877 feet (1,487 m)	1855	$122,500 (±$87,192)	Amos Fielding, an early settler of the area
Fairview	Sanpete	City	1,389	1.26 sq mi (3.3 km^{2})	6,948 feet (2,118 m)	1859	$59,750 (±$8,296)	The attractive surroundings of the area
Farmington*	Davis	City	24,934	9.95 sq mi (25.8 km^{2})	4,304 feet (1,312 m)	1847	$120,432 (±$8,570)	The farms found in the area
Farr West	Weber	City	7,881	5.92 sq mi (15.3 km^{2})	4,265 feet (1,300 m)	1858	$111,875 (±$24,199)	Named after Lorin Farr, an early LDS Church stake president of the area, and Chauncey W. West, another local LDS leader.
Fayette	Sanpete	Town	388	0.40 sq mi (1.0 km^{2})	5,052 feet (1,540 m)	1861	$67,917 (±$51,261)	Fayette, New York, where the LDS Church was organized
Ferron	Emery	City	1,361	2.33 sq mi (6.0 km^{2})	5,971 feet (1,820 m)	1877	$68,324 (±$19,238)	A. D. Ferron, surveyor of the area
Fielding	Box Elder	Town	643	0.51 sq mi (1.3 km^{2})	4,373 feet (1,333 m)	1892	$75,000 (±$15,374)	Mother of LDS Church President Joseph Fielding Smith
Fillmore*	Millard	City	2,633	6.97 sq mi (18.1 km^{2})	5,135 feet (1,565 m)	1851	$77,000 (±$19,921)	Millard Fillmore, President of the United States
Fountain Green	Sanpete	City	1,539	1.25 sq mi (3.2 km^{2})	5,899 feet (1,798 m)	1850	$70,402 (±$4,605)	Lush meadows surrounding the area's springs
Francis	Summit	Town	1,797	2.98 sq mi (7.7 km^{2})	6,562 feet (2,000 m)	1869	$113,500 (±$16,442)	Francis M. Lyman, a LDS Church Apostle
Fruit Heights	Davis	City	6,036	2.29 sq mi (5.9 km^{2})	4,698 feet (1,432 m)	1850	$134,500 (±$23,267)	Fruit orchards located above the valley floor
Garden City	Rich	Town	545	8.78 sq mi (22.7 km^{2})	5,968 feet (1,819 m)	1877	$62,750 (±$23,899)	Site was considered the garden spot of the valley
Garland	Box Elder	City	2,609	1.81 sq mi (4.7 km^{2})	4,340 feet (1,320 m)	1890	$65,369 (±$10,522)	William Garland, led the construction of a canal in the area
Genola	Utah	Town	1,766	13.76 sq mi (35.6 km^{2})	4,600 feet (1,400 m)	1935	$137,661 (±$30,863)	
Glendale	Kane	Town	488	7.00 sq mi (18.1 km^{2})	5,778 feet (1,761 m)	1862	$63,056 (±$32,284)	The place being in a glen or a narrow valley with mountains all around
Glenwood	Sevier	Town	653	0.52 sq mi (1.3 km^{2})	5,272 feet (1,607 m)	1863	$83,333 (±$30,094)	Robert Wilson Glenn, an early settler of the area
Goshen	Utah	Town	833	0.83 sq mi (2.1 km^{2})	4,551 feet (1,387 m)	1857	$93,529 (±$27,485)	Goshen, Connecticut, birthplace of Phineas W. Cooke, the first LDS Bishop of the area
Grantsville	Tooele	City	13,637	37.47 sq mi (97.0 km^{2})	4,304 feet (1,312 m)	1850	$97,216 (±$14,353)	Colonel George D. Grant of the Nauvoo Legion
Green River	Emery	City	804	27.14 sq mi (70.3 km^{2})	4,078 feet (1,243 m)	1876	$45,781 (±$16,115)	The Green River, a 730-mile (1,170 km) tributary of the Colorado River
Gunnison	Sanpete	City	3,537	4.79 sq mi (12.4 km^{2})	5,138 feet (1,566 m)	1859	$66,111 (±$15,417)	Captain John W. Gunnison, explored and surveyed Great Salt Lake, Utah Lake and the Salt Lake Valley for the Corps of Topographical Engineers
Hanksville	Wayne	Town	203	1.69 sq mi (4.4 km^{2})	4,291 feet (1,308 m)	1882	$37,614 (±$28,931)	Ebenezer Hanks, original settler of the area
Harrisville	Weber	City	6,919	2.98 sq mi (7.7 km^{2})	4,291 feet (1,308 m)	1850	$75,981 (±$9,985)	Marin H. Harris, a settler of the area
Hatch	Garfield	Town	119	1.82 sq mi (4.7 km^{2})	6,919 feet (2,109 m)	1872	$49,375 (±$43,352)	Meltiar Harch Sr., a settler of the area
Heber City*	Wasatch	City	17,438	8.99 sq mi (23.3 km^{2})	5,604 feet (1,708 m)	1858	$107,784 (±$7,694)	Heber C. Kimball, an Apostle of the LDS Church
Helper	Carbon	City	2,680	1.81 sq mi (4.7 km^{2})	5,817 feet (1,773 m)	1883	$61,908 (±$10,066)	The "Helper engines" or extra locomotives used to get trains over Soldier Summit from Helper to Spanish Fork
Henefer	Summit	Town	855	2.48 sq mi (6.4 km^{2})	5,335 feet (1,626 m)	1859	$106,667 (±$20,179)	Brothers James and Richard Henefer, original settlers of the area
Henrieville	Garfield	Town	292	1.35 sq mi (3.5 km^{2})	5,997 feet (1,828 m)	1878	$39,583 (±$30,186)	James Henrie, first stake president of the local LDS stake
Herriman	Salt Lake	City	57,336	21.63 sq mi (56.0 km^{2})	5,000 feet (1,500 m)	1849	$118,446 (±$4,908)	Henry Harriman, a prominent resident of the area
Hideout	Wasatch	Town	1,111	3.48 sq mi (9.0 km^{2})	6,588 feet (2,008 m)	2005	$76,912 (±$21,172)	Hideout Canyon
Highland	Utah	City	19,625	8.70 sq mi (22.5 km^{2})	4,977 feet (1,517 m)	1875	$178,662 (±$14,090)	Town's location on the upper bench of the Utah Valley
Hildale	Washington	City	1,301	5.60 sq mi (14.5 km^{2})	5,409 feet (1,649 m)	1962	$62,727 (±$29,378)	
Hinckley	Millard	Town	832	4.99 sq mi (12.9 km^{2})	4,603 feet (1,403 m)	1891	$80,500 (±$34,740)	Ira Hinckley, LDS Church stake president of the local LDS stake
Holden	Millard	Town	443	0.54 sq mi (1.4 km^{2})	5,102 feet (1,555 m)	1855	$72,500 (±$29,903)	Elijah E. Holden, an early settler of the area
Holladay	Salt Lake	City	31,236	8.50 sq mi (22.0 km^{2})	4,464 feet (1,361 m)	1848	$112,369 (±$11,370)	John Holladay, an early settler of the area
Honeyville	Box Elder	City	1,383	11.74 sq mi (30.4 km^{2})	4,298 feet (1,310 m)	1861	$80,347 (±$10,455)	Profession of the local LDS Bishop
Hooper	Weber	City	9,220	26.10 sq mi (67.6 km^{2})	4,242 feet (1,293 m)	1854	$114,773 (±$16,494)	William H. Hooper, Utah territorial delegate to the United States House of Representatives
Howell	Box Elder	Town	323	35.28 sq mi (91.4 km^{2})	4,560 feet (1,390 m)	1910	$86,176 (±$8,334)	Joseph Howell, president of the surveying company that laid out the area and Representative of the United States House of Representatives from Utah
Huntington	Emery	City	2,271	2.26 sq mi (5.9 km^{2})	5,787 feet (1,764 m)	1877	$79,091 (±$11,309)	William Huntington, an early explorer of the area
Huntsville	Weber	Town	493	0.83 sq mi (2.1 km^{2})	4,928 feet (1,502 m)	1860	$83,500 (±$52,385)	Jefferson Hunt, an early settler of the area
Hurricane	Washington	City	21,677	52.76 sq mi (136.6 km^{2})	3,248 feet (990 m)	1906	$67,424 (±$8,392)	LDS Church Apostle Erastus Snow's comments about the heavy wind in the area
Hyde Park	Cache	City	5,410	4.41 sq mi (11.4 km^{2})	4,537 feet (1,383 m)	1860	$108,068 (±$14,695)	Wiliam Hyde, one of the first settlers and first LDS Church Bishop of the area
Hyrum	Cache	City	10,022	6.19 sq mi (16.0 km^{2})	4,698 feet (1,432 m)	1860	$85,557 (±$4,932)	Hyrum Smith, brother to Joseph Smith, founder of the Latter Day Saint movement.
Independence	Wasatch	Town	71	30.55 sq mi (79.1 km^{2})	7,073 feet (2,156 m)	2008	$119,167 (±$49,368)	
Interlaken	Wasatch	Town	145	0.22 sq mi (0.57 km^{2})	5,919 feet (1,804 m)	2015	$152,857 (±$77,991)	
Ivins	Washington	City	9,524	9.44 sq mi (24.4 km^{2})	3,081 feet (939 m)	1922	$72,263 (±$12,043)	Anthony W. Ivins, a LDS Church Apostle
Joseph	Sevier	Town	546	0.87 sq mi (2.3 km^{2})	5,436 feet (1,657 m)	1871	$80,000 (±$10,723)	Joseph A. Young, first LDS Church stake president of the Sevier Stake
Junction*	Piute	Town	305	13.19 sq mi (34.2 km^{2})	6,007 feet (1,831 m)	1880		Located at the junction of the East Fork and the Sevier Rivers
Kamas	Summit	City	2,229	3.69 sq mi (9.6 km^{2})	6,486 feet (1,977 m)	1857	$87,353 (±$17,898)	Derived from the Native American word for the Small Camas, an edible bulb found in the valley
Kanab*	Kane	City	4,950	14.44 sq mi (37.4 km^{2})	4,970 feet (1,510 m)	1864	$80,040 (±$14,908)	Southern Paiute word for willow, referring to the willows growing along the area's creeks
Kanarraville	Iron	Town	304	0.45 sq mi (1.2 km^{2})	5,541 feet (1,689 m)	1861	$73,750 (±$59,625)	Chief Canarrah, local leader of the Southern Paiute tribe
Kanosh	Millard	Town	550	0.77 sq mi (2.0 km^{2})	5,020 feet (1,530 m)	1854	$76,974 (±$3,816)	Kanosh, the name of the local Native American Pahvant Ute leader
Kaysville	Davis	City	32,861	10.50 sq mi (27.2 km^{2})	4,357 feet (1,328 m)	1849	$128,996 (±$12,108)	William Kay, the area's first LDS Church Bishop
Kearns	Salt Lake	City	37,058	4.63 sq mi (12.0 km^{2})	4,528 feet (1,380 m)	1942	$83,355 (±$4,211)	Thomas Kearns, United States Senator from Utah
Kingston	Piute	Town	329	5.40 sq mi (14.0 km^{2})	6,017 feet (1,834 m)	1876		Thomas R. King, the area's first settler
Koosharem	Sevier	Town	294	0.83 sq mi (2.1 km^{2})	6,919 feet (2,109 m)	1877	$60,938 (±$12,360)	Southern Paiute word for an edible tuber that grows in the area
La Verkin	Washington	City	4,429	12.78 sq mi (33.1 km^{2})	3,192 feet (973 m)	1897	$63,061 (±$15,439)	Derived from the Spanish La Virgen, referring to the local Virgin River
Laketown	Rich	Town	420	2.52 sq mi (6.5 km^{2})	5,974 feet (1,821 m)	1864	$133,175 (±$16,695)	Town is located near Bear Lake, a 109-square-mile (280 km^{2}) lake on the Utah-Idaho border
Lake Point	Tooele	City	2,938	4.6 sq mi (12 km^{2})	4,249 feet (1,295 m)	1854	$79,643 (±$23,125)	Lake Point is a city on the eastern edge of northern Tooele County, Utah, United States on the south shore of the Great Salt Lake. The community was originally settled in 1854 under the name of E.T. City, in honor of Ezra T. Benson and renamed Lake Point in 1923.
Layton	Davis	City	82,512	22.50 sq mi (58.3 km^{2})	4,350 feet (1,330 m)	1920	$99,188 (±$4,335)	Christopher Layton, an early LDS Bishop
Leamington	Millard	Town	301	1.53 sq mi (4.0 km^{2})	4,731 feet (1,442 m)	1871	$54,688 (±$51,499)	Leamington Hastings, a town in England
Leeds	Washington	Town	693	6.30 sq mi (16.3 km^{2})	3,481 feet (1,061 m)	1867	$81,181 (±$12,183)	Leeds, a town in England where many of the early settlers were from
Lehi	Utah	City	81,039	28.11 sq mi (72.8 km^{2})	4,564 feet (1,391 m)	1850	$125,860 (±$4,807)	Lehi, a prophet from the Book of Mormon
Levan	Juab	Town	886	0.81 sq mi (2.1 km^{2})	5,315 feet (1,620 m)	1868	$78,047 (±$20,797)	
Lewiston	Cache	City	2,225	25.84 sq mi (66.9 km^{2})	4,508 feet (1,374 m)	1870	$88,333 (±$19,583)	William H. Lewis, a local LDS Bishop
Lindon	Utah	City	11,594	8.35 sq mi (21.6 km^{2})	4,642 feet (1,415 m)	1850	$104,583 (±$21,718)	Linden, a tree that grew in the center of town
Loa*	Wayne	Town	597	0.95 sq mi (2.5 km^{2})	7,064 feet (2,153 m)	1878	$66,838 (±$30,906)	Mauna Loa, a volcano in Hawaii, an early settler had served his LDS mission in Hawaii
Logan*	Cache	City	53,923	17.85 sq mi (46.2 km^{2})	4,534 feet (1,382 m)	1859	$56,764 (±$3,904)	Ephraim Logan, a trapper with Jedediah Smith who died in the area
Lyman	Wayne	Town	235	1.81 sq mi (4.7 km^{2})	7,182 feet (2,189 m)	1893	$50,625 (±$37,955)	Francis M. Lyman, a LDS Church Apostle
Lynndyl	Millard	Town	142	3.12 sq mi (8.1 km^{2})	4,787 feet (1,459 m)	1907	$51,750 (±$25,648)	
Magna	Salt Lake	City	29,488	15.11 sq mi (39.1 km^{2})	4,278 feet (1,304 m)	1868	$87,516 (±$8,011)	“Magna” comes from the Latin word meaning “great” or “superior"
Manila*	Daggett	Town	425	1.04 sq mi (2.7 km^{2})	6,348 feet (1,935 m)	1868	$71,607 (±$17,492)	Commemorate the Spanish–American War victory over the Spanish fleet in the Philippines at Manila
Manti*	Sanpete	City	3,532	3.16 sq mi (8.2 km^{2})	5,610 feet (1,710 m)	1849	$59,500 (±$12,665)	A city from the Book of Mormon
Mantua	Box Elder	Town	1,642	4.91 sq mi (12.7 km^{2})	5,200 feet (1,600 m)	1863	$134,239 (±$12,353)	LDS Church President Lorenzo Snow named it for his birthplace in Mantua, Ohio
Mapleton	Utah	City	12,340	13.35 sq mi (34.6 km^{2})	4,731 feet (1,442 m)	1856	$127,860 (±$8,904)	For the groves of maple trees found in the area
Marriott-Slaterville	Weber	City	1,885	7.21 sq mi (18.7 km^{2})	4,252 feet (1,296 m)	1849	$89,602 (±$21,175)	The towns of Marriott and Slaterville joined to form Marriott-Slaterville, they were named after early settlers John Marriott and Richard Slater
Marysvale	Piute	Town	522	17.98 sq mi (46.6 km^{2})	5,863 feet (1,787 m)	1863	$43,289 (±$12,195)	
Mayfield	Sanpete	Town	424	0.90 sq mi (2.3 km^{2})	5,538 feet (1,688 m)	1871	$82,083 (±$36,555)	The wild flowers that appeared in the spring
Meadow	Millard	Town	246	0.51 sq mi (1.3 km^{2})	4,839 feet (1,475 m)	1857	$43,750 (±$19,867)	The adjacent Meadow Creek
Mendon	Cache	City	1,446	1.43 sq mi (3.7 km^{2})	4,495 feet (1,370 m)	1859	$141,563 (±$21,922)	LDS Church Apostle Ezra T. Benson named it after his birthplace of Mendon, Massachusetts
Midvale	Salt Lake	City	35,736	5.91 sq mi (15.3 km^{2})	4,383 feet (1,336 m)	1909	$73,058 (±$2,648)	Located in the middle of the Salt Lake Valley
Midway	Wasatch	City	6,110	5.55 sq mi (14.4 km^{2})	5,584 feet (1,702 m)	1859	$146,750 (±$34,724)	A fort was built midway between two settlements
Milford	Beaver	City	1,400	2.14 sq mi (5.5 km^{2})	4,967 feet (1,514 m)	1873	$79,861 (±$14,014)	Derived from the crossing of the Beaver River by freighters to and from the mines to the west "Mill Ford"
Millcreek	Salt Lake	City	63,342	12.77 sq mi (33.1 km^{2})	4,285 feet (1,306 m)	1848	$98,502 (±$4,401)	Mill Creek, site of Utah's first flour mill
Millville	Cache	City	1,820	2.51 sq mi (6.5 km^{2})	4,616 feet (1,407 m)	1860	$90,417 (±$25,917)	The first saw mill in Cache Valley was built in the area
Minersville	Beaver	Town	901	2.18 sq mi (5.6 km^{2})	5,282 feet (1,610 m)	1859	$89,000 (±$15,155)	In honor of the miners who worked in the area
Moab*	Grand	City	5,316	4.80 sq mi (12.4 km^{2})	4,026 feet (1,227 m)	1855	$55,333 (±$9,641)	The Biblical name Moab or moapa, the Southern Paiute word for mosquito
Mona	Juab	City	1,647	2.65 sq mi (6.9 km^{2})	4,970 feet (1,510 m)	1852	$91,552 (±$17,076)	
Monroe	Sevier	City	2,570	3.57 sq mi (9.2 km^{2})	5,394 feet (1,644 m)	1863	$63,807 (±$8,629)	James Monroe, President of the United States
Monticello*	San Juan	City	1,941	3.66 sq mi (9.5 km^{2})	7,070 feet (2,150 m)	1879	$63,750 (±$13,895)	Monticello in Virginia, the home of Thomas Jefferson, President of the United States
Morgan*	Morgan	City	4,268	2.97 sq mi (7.7 km^{2})	5,069 feet (1,545 m)	1860	$114,102 (±$13,783)	Jedediah Morgan Grant, father to LDS Church President Heber J. Grant
Moroni	Sanpete	City	1,238	1.07 sq mi (2.8 km^{2})	5,531 feet (1,686 m)	1859	$71,500 (±$15,127)	Moroni, a prophet from the Book of Mormon
Mount Pleasant	Sanpete	City	3,737	2.93 sq mi (7.6 km^{2})	5,925 feet (1,806 m)	1852	$67,459 (±$9,595)	Pleasant view of the surrounding mountains
Murray	Salt Lake	City	49,904	12.32 sq mi (31.9 km^{2})	4,301 feet (1,311 m)	1848	$87,864 (±$5,118)	Eli Houston Murray, territorial Governor of Utah
Myton	Duchesne	City	662	1.01 sq mi (2.6 km^{2})	5,085 feet (1,550 m)	1905	$54,107 (±$16,413)	Major H. P. Myton of the U.S. Army
Naples	Uintah	City	3,217	6.60 sq mi (17.1 km^{2})	5,230 feet (1,590 m)	1878	$94,048 (±$7,573)	Naples, Italy
Nephi*	Juab	City	6,700	4.75 sq mi (12.3 km^{2})	5,128 feet (1,563 m)	1851	$97,348 (±$11,302)	Nephi, a prophet from the Book of Mormon
New Harmony	Washington	Town	353	0.61 sq mi (1.6 km^{2})	5,305 feet (1,617 m)	1862	$82,663 (±$17,972)	Harmony, Pennsylvania, where Joseph Smith translated the Book of Mormon
Newton	Cache	Town	899	0.86 sq mi (2.2 km^{2})	4,534 feet (1,382 m)	1869	$80,000 (±$12,293)	Originally called New Town, but the name was shortened
Nibley	Cache	City	7,651	4.39 sq mi (11.4 km^{2})	4,554 feet (1,388 m)	1855	$105,726 (±$9,727)	Charles W. Nibley, a local leader of the LDS Church
North Logan	Cache	City	11,228	7.13 sq mi (18.5 km^{2})	4,692 feet (1,430 m)	1884	$84,821 (±$11,254)	Located north of Logan
North Ogden	Weber	City	21,473	7.51 sq mi (19.5 km^{2})	4,501 feet (1,372 m)	1850	$107,425 (±$4,431)	Located north of Ogden
North Salt Lake	Davis	City	23,239	8.47 sq mi (21.9 km^{2})	4,334 feet (1,321 m)	1946	$106,885 (±$13,030)	Located north of Salt Lake City
Oak City	Millard	Town	770	0.94 sq mi (2.4 km^{2})	5,112 feet (1,558 m)	1868	$71,452 (±$6,151)	Sits adjacent to Oak Creek
Oakley	Summit	City	1,812	7.08 sq mi (18.3 km^{2})	6,434 feet (1,961 m)	1868	$102,143 (±$35,988)	The scrub oak species gambel oak found in the area
Ogden*	Weber	City	86,973	27.55 sq mi (71.4 km^{2})	4,300 feet (1,300 m)	1847	$70,053 (±$3,457)	Peter Skene Ogden, a trapper for the Hudson's Bay Company
Orangeville	Emery	City	1,281	1.43 sq mi (3.7 km^{2})	5,778 feet (1,761 m)	1878	$89,643 (±$22,605)	Orange Seely, a settler in the area
Orderville	Kane	Town	865	8.72 sq mi (22.6 km^{2})	5,449 feet (1,661 m)	1875	$91,944 (±$23,853)	The United Order, a collectivist movement of the LDS Church
Orem	Utah	City	97,048	18.61 sq mi (48.2 km^{2})	4,774 feet (1,455 m)	1850	$81,292 (±$2,038)	Walter Orem, President of the Salt Lake and Utah Electric Interurban Railroad
Panguitch*	Garfield	City	1,871	3.08 sq mi (8.0 km^{2})	6,624 feet (2,019 m)	1866	$75,283 (±$7,963)	A Southern Paiute name for nearby Panguitch Lake meaning "water" and "fish"
Paradise	Cache	Town	806	1.45 sq mi (3.8 km^{2})	4,902 feet (1,494 m)	1860	$95,000 (±$25,574)	For the beautiful scenery
Paragonah	Iron	Town	678	0.67 sq mi (1.7 km^{2})	5,879 feet (1,792 m)	1851	$70,057 (±$15,173)	Southern Paiute name for the nearby Little Salt Lake that means "marshland"
Park City	Summit/Wasatch	City	8,365	20.42 sq mi (52.9 km^{2})	7,000 feet (2,100 m)	1869	$140,875 (±$25,131)	For nearby Parley's Park, a meadow atop Parley's Canyon
Parowan*	Iron	City	3,095	6.89 sq mi (17.8 km^{2})	6,017 feet (1,834 m)	1851	$49,934 (±$9,628)	From the Southern Paiute words paragoons and pahoan, meaning "marsh people"
Payson	Utah	City	22,205	13.04 sq mi (33.8 km^{2})	4,700 feet (1,400 m)	1850	$84,286 (±$8,148)	James Pace, an early settler of the area
Perry	Box Elder	City	5,708	8.00 sq mi (20.7 km^{2})	4,367 feet (1,331 m)	1853	$99,478 (±$9,992)	Lorenzo Perry, first LDS Church Bishop of the town
Plain City	Weber	City	8,101	11.99 sq mi (31.1 km^{2})	4,242 feet (1,293 m)	1859	$126,250 (±$19,400)	Originally called City on the Plains
Pleasant Grove	Utah	City	37,544	9.18 sq mi (23.8 km^{2})	4,623 feet (1,409 m)	1849	$96,347 (±$4,643)	The grove of cottonwood trees found in the area
Pleasant View	Weber	City	11,104	6.98 sq mi (18.1 km^{2})	5,632 feet (1,717 m)	1851	$126,679 (±$7,218)	For the beautiful view of the surrounding valley
Plymouth	Box Elder	Town	394	0.83 sq mi (2.1 km^{2})	4,488 feet (1,368 m)	1869	$83,393 (±$9,437)	A large rock in the area resembled Plymouth Rock
Portage	Box Elder	Town	223	2.55 sq mi (6.6 km^{2})	4,367 feet (1,331 m)	1867	$55,313 (±$15,062)	Portage County, Ohio, the birthplace of LDS Church President Lorenzo Snow
Price*	Carbon	City	8,216	5.04 sq mi (13.1 km^{2})	5,627 feet (1,715 m)	1879	$46,947 (±$3,963)	From the nearby Price River which got its name from a local explorer William Price
Providence	Cache	City	8,675	3.90 sq mi (10.1 km^{2})	4,596 feet (1,401 m)	1859	$103,831 (±$13,120)	Originally Spring Creek, the town was renamed in November 1859 by Ezra T. Benson, who found the place "providential."
Provo*	Utah	City	114,303	41.69 sq mi (108.0 km^{2})	4,551 feet (1,387 m)	1850	$62,800 (±$2,449)	Étienne Provost, a trapper who visited the area
Randolph*	Rich	Town	772	1.29 sq mi (3.3 km^{2})	6,283 feet (1,915 m)	1870	$87,083 (±$33,923)	Randolph Stewart, an early settler and first LDS Church Bishop of the area
Redmond	Sevier	Town	773	0.94 sq mi (2.4 km^{2})	5,105 feet (1,556 m)	1875	$71,250 (±$11,193)	Red-colored mounds west of town
Richfield*	Sevier	City	8,173	5.93 sq mi (15.4 km^{2})	5,354 feet (1,632 m)	1863	$77,847 (±$5,530)	After a bountiful crop of wheat that was produced in 1865
Richmond	Cache	City	2,971	3.46 sq mi (9.0 km^{2})	4,610 feet (1,410 m)	1859	$103,047 (±$25,102)	Rich fertile soil of the valley
Riverdale	Weber	City	2,179	4.63 sq mi (12.0 km^{2})	4,370 feet (1,330 m)	1850	$109,063 (±$6,991)	The city's location next to the Weber River
River Heights	Cache	City	9,294	0.66 sq mi (1.7 km^{2})	4,580 feet (1,400 m)	1882	$64,496 (±$12,964)	Located above the Logan River
Riverton	Salt Lake	City	44,944	12.58 sq mi (32.6 km^{2})	4,439 feet (1,353 m)	1870	$119,093 (±$9,239)	The city's location next to the Jordan River
Rockville	Washington	Town	169	8.47 sq mi (21.9 km^{2})	3,740 feet (1,140 m)	1860	$46,250 (±$24,513)	After the rocky soil of the area
Rocky Ridge	Juab	Town	901	1.71 sq mi (4.4 km^{2})	4,990 feet (1,520 m)	1875	$89,485 (±$12,708)	For the many rocks in the area
Roosevelt	Duchesne	City	6,960	6.76 sq mi (17.5 km^{2})	5,095 feet (1,553 m)	1905	$72,664 (±$5,335)	Theodore Roosevelt, President of the United States
Roy	Weber	City	39,021	8.14 sq mi (21.1 km^{2})	4,541 feet (1,384 m)	1876	$91,112 (±$5,279)	Roy C. Peebles was the name of the recently deceased son of area resident David P. Peebles
Rush Valley	Tooele	Town	425	18.08 sq mi (46.8 km^{2})	5,043 feet (1,537 m)	1856	$85,917 (±$7,107)	Nearby Rush Lake
Salem	Utah	City	9,893	10.50 sq mi (27.2 km^{2})	4,610 feet (1,410 m)	1851	$107,617 (±$7,335)	Salem, Massachusetts
Salina	Sevier	City	2,521	5.83 sq mi (15.1 km^{2})	5,161 feet (1,573 m)	1863	$64,464 (±$10,576)	Nearby salt deposits
Salt Lake City*	Salt Lake	City	203,888	110.34 sq mi (285.8 km^{2})	4,226 feet (1,288 m)	1847	$74,925 (±$2,172)	Nearby Great Salt Lake
Sandy	Salt Lake	City	94,723	24.15 sq mi (62.5 km^{2})	4,450 feet (1,360 m)	1871	$111,242 (±$5,252)	Perhaps most widely believed is that Brigham Young named Sandy for its thirsty soil, but there is no historical evidence for this. Another theory is that the name came from a legendary and colorful Scotsman, Alexander "Sandy" Kinghorn, the engineer who ran the first train line to this end of the Salt Lake Valley.
Santa Clara	Washington	City	7,891	6.12 sq mi (15.9 km^{2})	2,762 feet (842 m)	1854	$93,083 (±$4,599)	Town is located on the Santa Clara Creek
Santaquin	Utah/Juab	City	15,391	10.44 sq mi (27.0 km^{2})	4,984 feet (1,519 m)	1851	$95,175 (±$5,050)	The son of Guffich, a local Ute Tribe leader
Saratoga Springs	Utah	City	44,070	23.23 sq mi (60.2 km^{2})	4,505 feet (1,373 m)	1997	$123,619 (±$3,276)	Saratoga Springs, New York, and the local hot springs
Scipio	Millard	Town	435	1.04 sq mi (2.7 km^{2})	5,315 feet (1,620 m)	1859	$82,292 (±$12,952)	Scipio Kenner, a settler of the area
Scofield	Carbon	Town	33	0.92 sq mi (2.4 km^{2})	7,739 feet (2,359 m)	1879		General Charles W. Scofield, a local mine official
Sigurd	Sevier	Town	453	0.98 sq mi (2.5 km^{2})	5,226 feet (1,593 m)	1874	$80,000 (±$9,621)	Sigurd, The Danish residents named the town after the Norse mythological hero
Smithfield	Cache	City	14,033	5.35 sq mi (13.9 km^{2})	4,603 feet (1,403 m)	1859	$90,602 (±$5,469)	John Glover Smith, the first LDS Bishop of the area
Snowville	Box Elder	Town	246	1.55 sq mi (4.0 km^{2})	4,547 feet (1,386 m)	1871	$71,500 (±$32,581)	Lorenzo Snow, LDS Church President
South Jordan	Salt Lake	City	80,331	22.19 sq mi (57.5 km^{2})	4,439 feet (1,353 m)	1859	$126,400 (±$7,896)	The nearby Jordan River and its location south of West Jordan
South Ogden	Weber	City	17,563	3.90 sq mi (10.1 km^{2})	4,449 feet (1,356 m)	1848	$81,543 (±$7,786)	Located south of Ogden
South Salt Lake	Salt Lake	City	26,277	6.94 sq mi (18.0 km^{2})	4,225 feet (1,288 m)	1847	$68,035 (±$5,555)	Located south of Salt Lake City
South Weber	Davis	City	8,037	4.64 sq mi (12.0 km^{2})	4,551 feet (1,387 m)	1851	$132,667 (±$14,245)	Located on the south side of the Weber River
Spanish Fork	Utah	City	43,632	16.21 sq mi (42.0 km^{2})	4,577 feet (1,395 m)	1851	$98,497 (±$4,208)	The nearby Spanish Fork (river) where Spanish explorer Silvestre Vélez de Escalante entered the Utah Valley
Spring City	Sanpete	City	1,094	1.41 sq mi (3.7 km^{2})	5,823 feet (1,775 m)	1852	$65,139 (±$14,256)	The nearby springs
Springdale	Washington	Town	416	4.62 sq mi (12.0 km^{2})	3,898 feet (1,188 m)	1862	$69,545 (±$32,760)	The nearby springs
Springville	Utah	City	35,474	14.38 sq mi (37.2 km^{2})	4,577 feet (1,395 m)	1850	$88,516 (±$5,031)	The nearby springs
St. George*	Washington	City	99,184	78.46 sq mi (203.2 km^{2})	2,860 feet (870 m)	1861	$72,870 (±$3,242)	George A. Smith, a LDS Church Apostle
Sterling	Sanpete	Town	303	0.32 sq mi (0.83 km^{2})	5,574 feet (1,699 m)	1873	$64,261 (±$9,096)	The "sterling" qualities of its people
Stockton	Tooele	Town	897	1.68 sq mi (4.4 km^{2})	5,118 feet (1,560 m)	1863	$92,857 (±$55,704)	Stockton, California where many of the soldiers who settled the area were from
Sunset	Davis	City	5,567	1.46 sq mi (3.8 km^{2})	4,511 feet (1,375 m)	1935	$74,250 (±$11,045)	Located on a ridge with views of the sunset over the Great Salt Lake
Syracuse	Davis	City	34,009	10.18 sq mi (26.4 km^{2})	4,285 feet (1,306 m)	1878	$132,459 (±$5,246)	Named for a local resort on the Great Salt Lake which was named after Syracuse, New York
Tabiona	Duchesne	Town	157	0.10 sq mi (0.26 km^{2})	6,516 feet (1,986 m)	1860	$69,167 (±$9,227)	Originally called Tabby and Tabbyville referring to Ute tribe leader Tava whose nickname was Tabby
Taylorsville	Salt Lake	City	59,010	10.85 sq mi (28.1 km^{2})	4,295 feet (1,309 m)	1848	$85,608 (±$3,611)	John Taylor, LDS Church President
Tooele*	Tooele	City	37,265	24.14 sq mi (62.5 km^{2})	5,043 feet (1,537 m)	1851	$88,893 (±$4,605)	Native American Goshute tribe leader Tuilla
Toquerville	Washington	City	2,115	22.20 sq mi (57.5 km^{2})	3,389 feet (1,033 m)	1858	$91,818 (±$22,335)	Native American Southern Paiute tribe leader Toquer
Torrey	Wayne	Town	332	1.66 sq mi (4.3 km^{2})	6,837 feet (2,084 m)	1880s	$74,423 (±$26,197)	Colonel Torrey, a veteran of the Spanish–American War
Tremonton	Box Elder	City	10,886	8.02 sq mi (20.8 km^{2})	4,325 feet (1,318 m)	1888	$72,028 (±$2,099)	Tremont, Illinois, where a group of settlers came from
Trenton	Cache	Town	534	8.21 sq mi (21.3 km^{2})	4,462 feet (1,360 m)	1870	$83,000 (±$21,028)	Trenton, New Jersey, hometown of the area's first LDS Bishop
Tropic	Garfield	Town	537	7.91 sq mi (20.5 km^{2})	6,309 feet (1,923 m)	1891	$64,375 (±$28,919)	The area had a milder climate than where the settlers originally came from
Uintah	Weber	City	1,461	1.24 sq mi (3.2 km^{2})	4,537 feet (1,383 m)	1850	$101,417 (±$19,020)	Uintah band of the Ute tribe
Vernal*	Uintah	City	10,254	4.62 sq mi (12.0 km^{2})	5,328 feet (1,624 m)	1876	$59,178 (±$8,275)	Latin word vernalis for spring, for the many springs in the area
Vernon	Tooele	Town	324	8.06 sq mi (20.9 km^{2})	5,515 feet (1,681 m)	1862	$76,250 (±$45,107)	Joseph Vernon, a local settler that was killed by Native Americans
Vineyard	Utah	City	13,510	4.80 sq mi (12.4 km^{2})	4,557 feet (1,389 m)	1989	$100,022 (±$11,471)	The grape vines that were planted in the area
Virgin	Washington	Town	734	12.72 sq mi (32.9 km^{2})	3,606 feet (1,099 m)	1857	$80,625 (±$17,886)	The nearby Virgin River
Wales	Sanpete	Town	345	0.40 sq mi (1.0 km^{2})	5,627 feet (1,715 m)	1857	$75,625 (±$37,259)	Local settlers originally came from Wales
Wallsburg	Wasatch	Town	266	0.63 sq mi (1.6 km^{2})	5,676 feet (1,730 m)	1861	$92,292 (±$22,626)	William Madison Wall, local settler and explorer
Washington	Washington	City	30,686	34.79 sq mi (90.1 km^{2})	2,792 feet (851 m)	1857	$94,015 (±$10,869)	George Washington, President of the United States
Washington Terrace	Weber	City	9,196	2.04 sq mi (5.3 km^{2})	4,610 feet (1,410 m)	1878	$79,971 (±$5,741)	Combination of location (Washington Blvd) and the Terrace Housing Project of 1942.
Wellington	Carbon	City	1,526	5.11 sq mi (13.2 km^{2})	5,413 feet (1,650 m)	1878	$58,807 (±$7,552)	Wellington Seeley Jr., Judge of the Emery County Court
Wellsville	Cache	City	4,120	7.27 sq mi (18.8 km^{2})	4,547 feet (1,386 m)	1856	$110,543 (±$14,111)	Daniel H. Wells, LDS Church Apostle
Wendover	Tooele	City	1,264	8.93 sq mi (23.1 km^{2})	4,291 feet (1,308 m)	1906	$45,938 (±$9,945)	
West Bountiful	Davis	City	5,920	3.31 sq mi (8.6 km^{2})	4,268 feet (1,301 m)	1848	$127,344 (±$20,067)	Located west of Bountiful
West Haven	Weber	City	19,977	10.64 sq mi (27.6 km^{2})	4,272 feet (1,302 m)	1854	$104,307 (±$16,720)	
West Jordan	Salt Lake	City	116,277	32.33 sq mi (83.7 km^{2})	4,373 feet (1,333 m)	1848	$103,960 (±$4,002)	Located on the west side of the Jordan River
West Point	Davis	City	11,559	7.11 sq mi (18.4 km^{2})	4,314 feet (1,315 m)	1867	$118,660 (±$7,849)	Named after West Point, New York, location of the United States Military Academy.
West Valley City	Salt Lake	City	137,955	35.83 sq mi (92.8 km^{2})	4,304 feet (1,312 m)	1849	$88,604 (±$3,877)	Located on the western side of the Salt Lake Valley
White City	Salt Lake	City	5,568	0.87 sq mi (2.3 km^{2})	4,583 feet (1,397 m)	1955	$98,603 (±$11,303)	M. Kenneth White, the town's founder and developer
Willard	Box Elder	City	2,008	5.56 sq mi (14.4 km^{2})	4,350 feet (1,330 m)	1851	$91,875 (±$11,039)	Willard Richards, a LDS Church Apostle
Woodland Hills	Utah	City	1,439	2.53 sq mi (6.6 km^{2})	5,331 feet (1,625 m)	1867	$137,426 (±$27,433)	Located at the base of canyon where groves of trees are located
Woodruff	Rich	Town	302	0.72 sq mi (1.9 km^{2})	6,339 feet (1,932 m)	1865	$66,719 (±$20,981)	Wilford Woodruff, LDS Church President
Woods Cross	Davis	City	11,490	3.83 sq mi (9.9 km^{2})	4,377 feet (1,334 m)	1865	$115,335 (±$13,215)	Daniel C. Wood, an early settler

== See also ==
- List of census-designated places in Utah
- List of ghost towns in Utah
- Utah locations by per capita income
