= Birdseye, Utah =

Unincorporated community in Utah, U.S.

- Unincorporated community
- Location of Birdseye within the State of Utah
- Coordinates: 39°55′28″N 111°32′59″W
- Country: United States
- State: Utah
- County: Utah
- Settled: 1885
- Named for: Birdseye marble
- Elevation: 5,430 ft (1,660 m)
- Time zone: UTC-5 (Mountain (MST))
  - Summer (DST): UTC-4 (MDT)
- ZIP code: 84629
- Area codes: 801 & 385
- GNIS feature ID: 1438817

Birdseye is an unincorporated community in southeastern Utah County, Utah, United States.

Historical population
| Census | Pop. | Note | %± |
|---|---|---|---|
| 1900 | 150 | | — |
| 1910 | 134 | | −10.7% |
| 1920 | 50 | | −62.7% |
| 1930 | 116 | | 132.0% |
| 1940 | 90 | | −22.4% |
| 1950 | 77 | | −14.4% |
Source: U.S. Census Bureau

== Description ==
The community is located on the back of the Wasatch Range, southeast of Loafer Mountain along U.S. Route 89 at the confluence of Bennie Creek and Thistle Creek.

Birdseye was settled in 1885 and originally named Summit Basin and later Clinton. The present name "Birdseye" was chosen because of the nearby birdseye marble located in the quarries near Indianola.

== Notable person ==
- Shawn Nelson - Born in Birdseye, he was a plumber and U.S. Army veteran who stole an M60A3 Patton tank from a U.S. National Guard armory in San Diego, California and went on a rampage on May 17, 1995.
