= Dover, Utah =

Dover
- Ghost town
- Location within Utah Location within the United States
- Coordinates: 39°12′27″N 111°53′46″W
- Country: United States
- State: Utah
- County: Sanpete
- Founded: 1877
- Abandoned: 1930s
- Founder: William Robinson
- Named for: Dover

Dover is a ghost town located in Sanpete County, Utah, United States. The site lies west of Fayette across the Sevier River.

The community was named after Dover, in England.

== History ==
The land was first settled in 1877–1878 by 45 families led by William Robinson. They found the soil was good, but water somewhat scarce. By 1879 they had a schoolhouse, also used for church and civic functions, and a post office, which operated until 1895. There were also two general stores, where residents typically paid for goods in kind with eggs.

When Utah Territory achieved statehood on January 4, 1896, Dover's celebrations took a tragic turn. They had no cannon to fire, instead exploding some dynamite with a well-driving hammer. The hammer, which had been through many such celebrations before, blew apart, injuring several people.

In the years 1910–1916, irrigation companies in Millard County dammed the Sevier River some distance to the north. The resulting reservoir, now known as Yuba Reservoir, covered parts of Dover's farmland, driving out some of the residents. A severe drought in the 1930s finished off the town; a few houses were moved, and most of the others were later torn down. Nothing remains but some foundations and fallen buildings, and a memorial cemetery.
