= Axtell, Utah =

Unincorporated community in the state of Utah, United States

- Unincorporated community
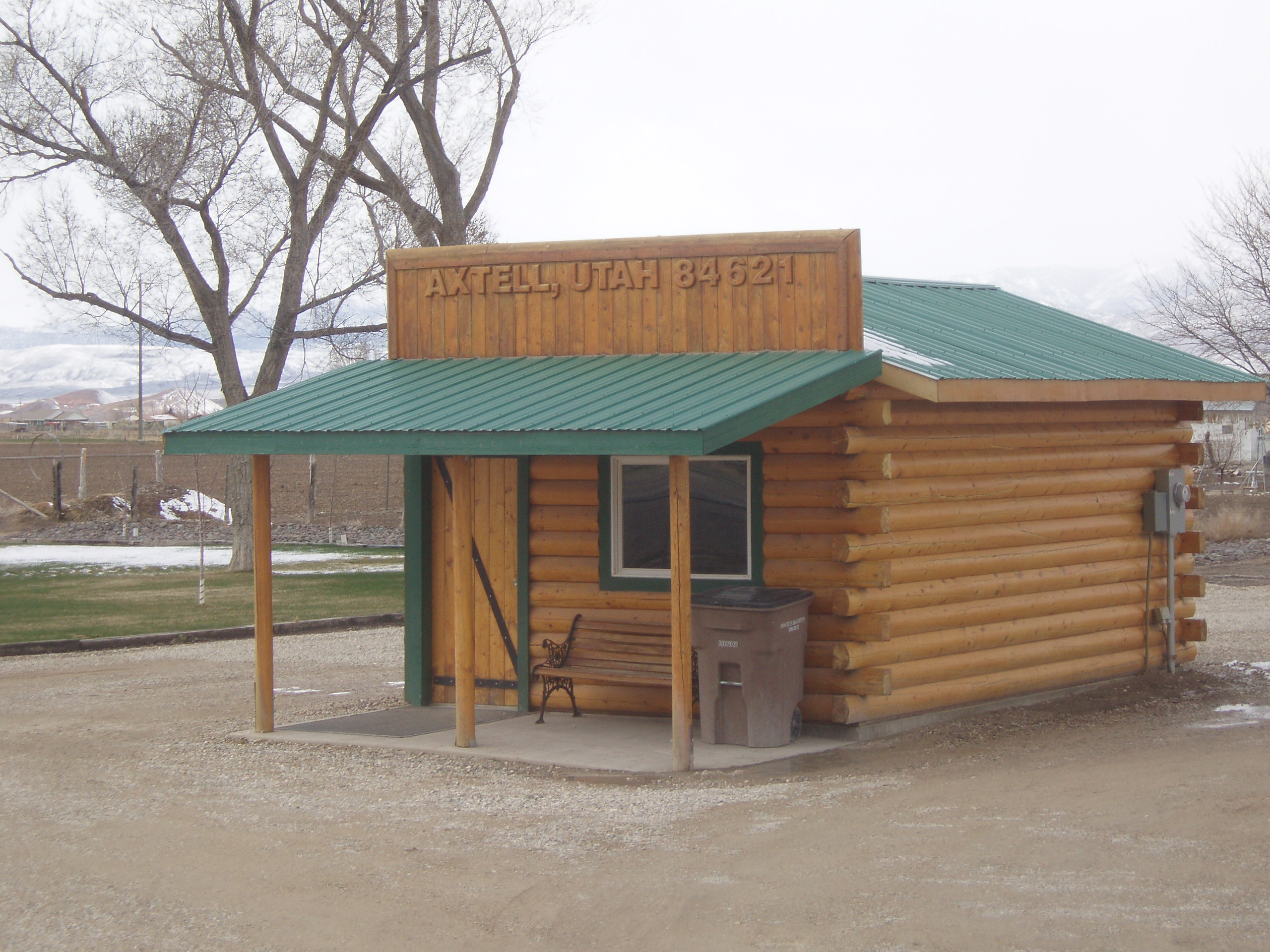
- Axtell post office, April 2010

- Location of Axtell within the State of Utah
- Coordinates: 39°3′19″N 111°49′19″W
- Country: United States
- State: Utah
- County: Sanpete
- Settled: 1870
- Founded by: Lars Peter Fjeldsted
- Named after: Samuel Beach Axtell
- Elevation: 5,151 ft (1,570 m)
- Time zone: UTC-7 (Mountain (MST))
  - Summer (DST): UTC-6 (MDT)
- ZIP codes: 84621
- Area code: 435
- GNIS feature ID: 1437493

Axtell is an unincorporated community in the Sevier Valley on the southwestern edge of Sanpete County, Utah, United States.

== Description ==
Historical population
Census	Pop.	Note	%±
1930	266		—
1940	288		8.3%
1950	238		−17.4%
Source: U.S. Census Bureau

The community is located on the U.S. Route 89 between the cities of Centerfield and Salina. The town was settled in 1870 under the name of Willowcreek (being located along the Willow Creek). It was renamed for Utah's former territorial governor Samuel Beach Axtell in 1891.
