= South Sanpete School District =

School district in Utah, United States

South Sanpete School District is a public school district in the U.S. state of Utah. The district provides education for students in the southern half of Sanpete County. The offices for the district are located in Manti. There are three elementary schools, two middle schools, two high schools and two alternative schools within the district. Enrollment in 2025 was 3,102 students.

The district includes Manti, Centerfield, Ephraim, Fayette, Gunnison, Mayfield, and Sterling.

== District schools ==
School name	City/town	Grade level	Students	Student/teacher ratio	Mascot
AFTEC-Palisades Pals (alternative school)	Manti	n/a	2	2.0	
Ephraim Elementary	Ephraim	K–5	412	20.6	Read-a-saurus
Ephraim Middle	Ephraim	6–8	399	19.3	Buffalo
Gunnison Valley Elementary	Gunnison	K–5	461	24.0	Bulldog Pup
Gunnison Valley High	Gunnison	9–12	322	17.4	Bulldog
Gunnison Valley Middle	Gunnison	6–8	245	16.6	Bulldog
Manti Elementary	Manti	K–5	391	20.9	Eagle
Manti High School	Manti	9–12	551	19.3	Templar
Sanpete Academy (alternative high school)	Ephraim	9–12	50	8.5	Mountaineer
YWEC (alternative school)	Manti	n/a	9	9.0	

== See also ==
- List of school districts in Utah
- North Sanpete School District
