= Sanpete County, Utah =

County in Utah, United States

- County
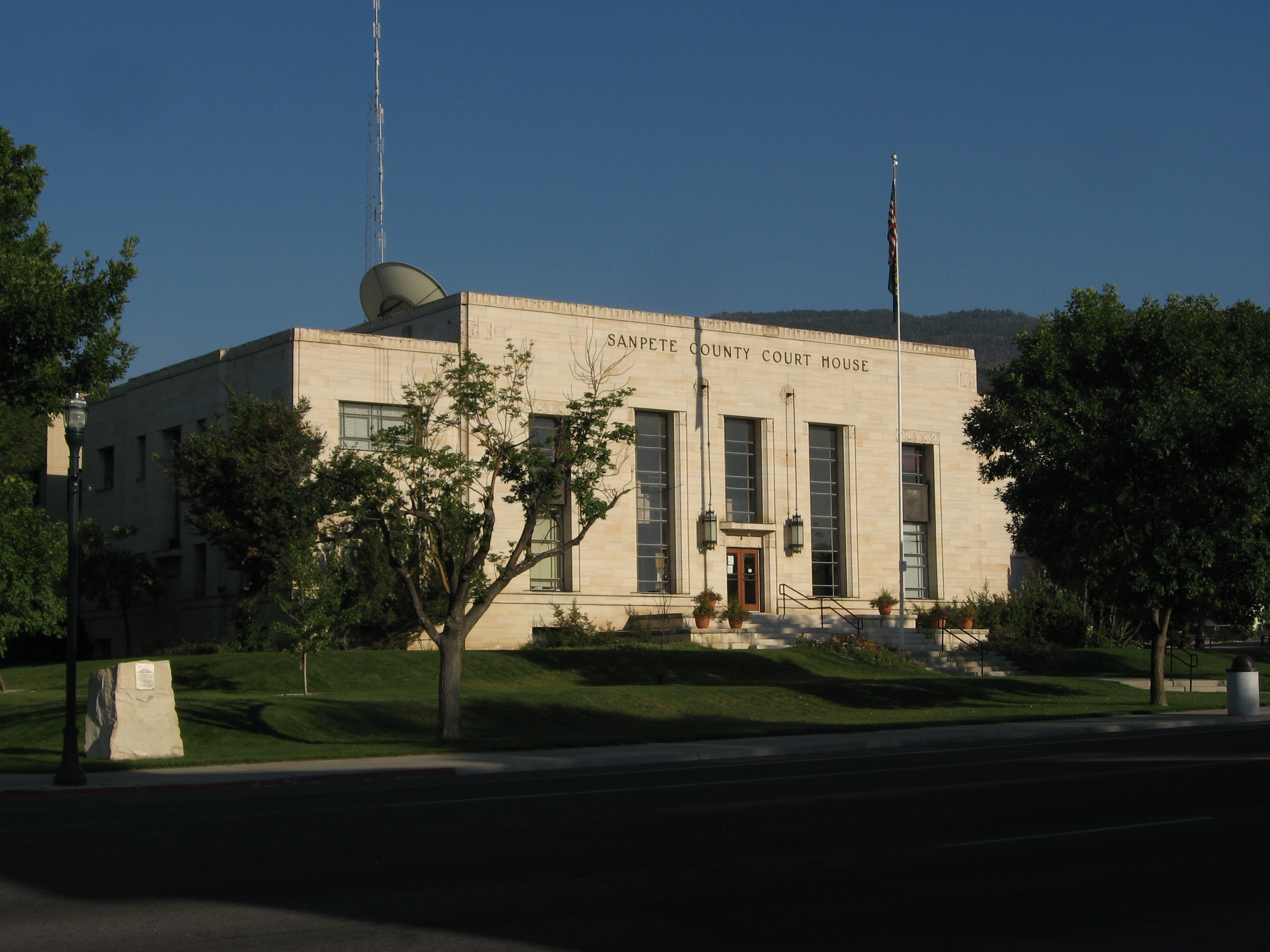
- Sanpete County Courthouse

- Location within the U.S. state of Utah
- Coordinates: 39°22′N 111°35′W
- Country: United States
- State: Utah
- Founded: January 31, 1850
- Named for: Chief Sanpitch
- Seat: Manti
- Largest city: Ephraim

Area
  - Total: 1,603 sq mi (4,150 km^{2})
  - Land: 1,590 sq mi (4,100 km^{2})
  - Water: 12 sq mi (31 km^{2}) 0.8%

Population (2020)
  - Total: 28,437
  - Estimate (2025): 31,453 ▲
  - Density: 17.9/sq mi (6.91/km^{2})
- Time zone: UTC−7 (Mountain)
  - Summer (DST): UTC−6 (MDT)
- Congressional district: 4th
- Website: www.sanpetecountyutah.gov

Sanpete County (/sænˈpiːt/ san-PEET) is a county in the U.S. state of Utah. As of the 2020 United States census, the population was 28,437. Its county seat is Manti, and its largest city is Ephraim. The county was created in 1850.

== History ==
The Sanpete Valley may have been traversed or inhabited as long as 32,000 BP by small bands of hunters. This habitation may have continued for about 20,000 years when the extinction of larger game animals forced a change. About 8,500 years ago, different groups (characterized by use of atlatls, millstones and textiles) came onto the scene. These also departed the area about 2,500 years ago, for unknown reasons, after which the area does not seem to have been visited by humans for 1,500 years.

Archeological evidence indicates that the Fremont people appeared next on the stage (from about 1-1300 CE), the first inhabitants of the area to domesticate crops and create relatively large communal settlements. In this county, the best-known Fremont site to date is "Witch's Knoll" three miles (4.8 km) SE of Ephraim. Around 1300 AD the evidence of Fremont habitation also ceases. The most recent groups of indigenous Americans in the Sanpete region are the Ute, Paiute, Goshute, and Shoshoni, who appeared in Utah about 1300 and "perhaps they displaced, replaced, or assimilated the part-time Fremont hunter-gatherers." The Utes, Paiutes, Goshute and Shoshone share a common language family called Numic.

Mormon pioneers arrived in the Great Basin in the summer of 1847. The first few years were spent establishing a base in the Great Salt Lake Valley, then groups were sent, usually by the directive of the church leaders, to settle the more outlying areas. In 1849 two Ute chiefs traveled from what is now Sanpete County about 125 miles (201 km) north to the Salt Lake Valley to request a Mormon settlement be established. The chiefs, Walkara and Sowiette, asked Mormon leader Brigham Young to settle a group of his people in the valley of Sanpitch. Young sent a party to explore the area in August of that year. It was deemed favorable to settlement, and Brigham Young called Isaac Morley and George Washington Bradley to organize about fifty families to move south and settle "San Pete." The group of 224 arrived on November 19, led by Isaac Morley, Charles Shumway, Seth Taft, and George Washington Bradley. After some debate, the first settlement in the valley was established on the present site of Manti, Utah.

The State of Deseret enacted the county effective January 31, 1850. The region was named for the Ute chief Sanpitch, which was changed to Sanpete. According to William Bright, the name comes from the Ute word saimpitsi, meaning "people of the tules".

The county boundaries were adjusted more than a dozen times during the 19th century. These adjustments often shrank it from its previous size. As of 1880, the county of Sanpete included the area of what would later become modern-day Carbon County, as well as some of Emery, Uintah, and Grand Counties. An adjustment in 1913 and refining of the county boundary definitions in 1919 brought Sanpete County to its present configuration.

The Sanpete County Courthouse, completed in 1935 by the Works Project Administration, is on the National Register of Historic Places.

== Geography ==
The Sanpete Valley runs from north to south through the center of the county. The county is sloped to the south, with its highest point east of Ephraim, on South Tent Mountain at 11,285 ft (3,440 m) ASL. The county has a total area of 1,603 square miles (4,150 km^{2}), of which 1,590 square miles (4,100 km^{2}) is land and 12 square miles (31 km^{2}) (0.8%) is water. The geographical center of Utah is located in Sanpete County, just west of Ephraim.

Sanpete County is bounded along its eastern side by the Wasatch Plateau (sometimes known as the Manti Mountains). The Wasatch Plateau rises to approximately 11,000 feet (3,400 m). Most of the Wasatch Plateau is encompassed by the Manti Division of the Manti-La Sal National Forest. Runoff from the western slopes of these mountains provides water to the county's cities and agricultural areas. Central Sanpete is dominated by the Sanpete Valley (sometimes known as the Sanpitch Valley), where most of the county's cities are located. The western side of the valley is bounded by the lower and drier San Pitch Mountains, which also form part of the western boundary of the county. The San Pitch River runs from north to south through Sanpete and empties into the Sevier River in southwestern Sanpete. This portion of the Sevier River Valley is known as Gunnison Valley.

=== Major highways ===
- United States Highway US-89
- Utah State Highway UT-28
- Utah State Highway UT-31
- Utah State Highway UT-116
- Utah State Highway UT-132
- Utah State Highway UT-137
- Utah State Highway UT-264

=== Adjacent counties ===
- Utah County - north
- Carbon County - northeast
- Emery County - east
- Sevier County - south
- Millard County - southwest
- Juab County - northwest

=== Protected areas ===
- Bald Mountain Wildlife Management Area
- Fishlake National Forest (part)
- Hilltop Wildlife Management Area
- Manti-La Sal National Forest (part)
- Manti Wildlife Management Area
- Mayfield Face Wildlife Management Area
- Palisade State Park
- Spring City Wildlife Management Area
- Uinta-Wasatch-Cache National Forest (part)
- Yuba State Park

=== Lakes ===
- Academy Mill Reservoir
- Beaver Dam Reservoir (Benches Pond)
- Big Springs
- Blind Lake
- Blue Lake (near Grassy Lake)
- Blue Lake (near Henningson Reservoir)
- Blue Lake (near Wrigley Springs Reservoir)
- Boulger Reservoir
- Brush Reservoir
- Chester Ponds
- Commissary Spring
- Cottonwood Reservoir
- Cove Lake
- Deep Lake
- Dry Hole Reservoir
- Duck Fork Reservoir
- Emerald Lake
- Emery Reservoir
- Fairview Lakes
- Ferron Reservoir
- Grass Flat Reservoir
- Grassy Lake
- Gunnison Reservoir
- Hamburger Lake
- Harmonica Lake
- Hartney Lake
- Henningson Reservoir
- Huntington Reservoir
- Island Lake
- Jet Fox Reservoir
- John August Lake
- Johnson Springs
- Julius Flat Reservoir
- Little Madsen Reservoir
- Lizard Lake
- Loggers Fork Reservoir
- Lower Gooseberry Reservoir
- Madsen Lake
- Marys Lake
- McKinley Strates Reservoir
- Miller Flat Reservoir (part)
- New Canyon Reservoir
- Newfield Reservoir
- Ninemile Reservoir
- Olafs Pond
- Oleys Lakes
- Olsen Slough
- Palisade Lake
- Patton Reservoir
- Petes Hole Reservoir
- Petes Reservoir
- Rolfson Reservoir
- Rush Pond
- Sevier Bridge Reservoir (Yuba Lake) (part)
- Slide Lake
- Sixmile Ponds
  - Lower Pond
  - Upper Pond
- Snow Lake
- Soup Bowl
- Spinners Reservoir
- Crooked Creek Spring
- Three Lakes (one of the three)
- Town Reservoir
- Twin Lake
- Wales Reservoir
- Willow Lake
- Woods Lake
- WPA Ponds
- Wrigley Springs Reservoir (part)
- Yearns Reservoir

== Demographics ==
Historical population
Census	Pop.	Note	%±
1850	365		—
1860	3,815		945.2%
1870	6,786		77.9%
1880	11,557		70.3%
1890	13,146		13.7%
1900	16,313		24.1%
1910	16,704		2.4%
1920	17,505		4.8%
1930	16,022		−8.5%
1940	16,063		0.3%
1950	13,891		−13.5%
1960	11,053		−20.4%
1970	10,976		−0.7%
1980	14,620		33.2%
1990	16,259		11.2%
2000	22,763		40.0%
2010	27,822		22.2%
2020	28,437		2.2%
2025 (est.)	31,453	▲	10.6%
US Decennial Census; 1790–1960 1900–1990; 1990–2000 2010 2020

=== 2020 census ===
According to the 2020 United States census and 2020 American Community Survey, there were 28,437 people in Sanpete County with a population density of 17.9 people per square mile (6.9/km^{2}). Among non-Hispanic or Latino people, the racial makeup was 23,688 (83.3%) White, 224 (0.8%) African American, 240 (0.8%) Native American, 171 (0.6%) Asian, 247 (0.9%) Pacific Islander, 81 (0.3%) from other races, and 743 (2.6%) from two or more races. 3,043 (10.7%) people were Hispanic or Latino.

Sanpete County, Utah – Racial and ethnic composition Note: the US Census treats Hispanic/Latino as an ethnic category. This table excludes Latinos from the racial categories and assigns them to a separate category. Hispanics/Latinos may be of any race.
Race / Ethnicity (NH = Non-Hispanic)	Pop 2000	Pop 2010	Pop 2020	% 2000	% 2010	% 2020
White alone (NH)	20,590	24,109	23,688	90.45%	86.65%	83.30%
Black or African American alone (NH)	61	209	224	0.27%	0.75%	0.79%
Native American or Alaska Native alone (NH)	185	241	240	0.81%	0.87%	0.84%
Asian alone (NH)	109	145	171	0.48%	0.52%	0.60%
Pacific Islander alone (NH)	78	132	247	0.34%	0.47%	0.87%
Other race alone (NH)	4	31	81	0.02%	0.11%	0.28%
Mixed race or Multiracial (NH)	226	336	743	0.99%	1.21%	2.61%
Hispanic or Latino (any race)	1,510	2,619	3,043	6.63%	9.41%	10.70%
Total	22,763	27,822	28,437	100.00%	100.00%	100.00%

There were 15,266 (53.68%) males and 13,171 (46.32%) females, and the population distribution by age was 8,003 (28.1%) under the age of 18, 15,846 (55.7%) from 18 to 64, and 4,588 (16.1%) who were at least 65 years old. The median age was 33.7 years.

There were 8,394 households in Sanpete County with an average size of 3.39 of which 6,459 (76.9%) were families and 1,935 (23.1%) were non-families. Among all families, 5,387 (64.2%) were married couples, 389 (4.6%) were male householders with no spouse, and 683 (8.1%) were female householders with no spouse. Among all non-families, 1,610 (19.2%) were a single person living alone and 325 (3.9%) were two or more people living together. 3,190 (38.0%) of all households had children under the age of 18. 6,473 (77.1%) of households were owner-occupied while 1,921 (22.9%) were renter-occupied.

The median income for a Sanpete County household was $55,820 and the median family income was $65,047, with a per-capita income of $21,254. The median income for males that were full-time employees was $51,250 and for females $32,833. 14.8% of the population and 9.3% of families were below the poverty line.

In terms of education attainment, out of the 18,205 people in Sanpete County 25 years or older, 1,465 (8.0%) had not completed high school, 5,758 (31.6%) had a high school diploma or equivalency, 7,205 (39.6%) had some college or associate degree, 2,541 (14.0%) had a bachelor's degree, and 1,236 (6.8%) had a graduate or professional degree.

== Economy ==
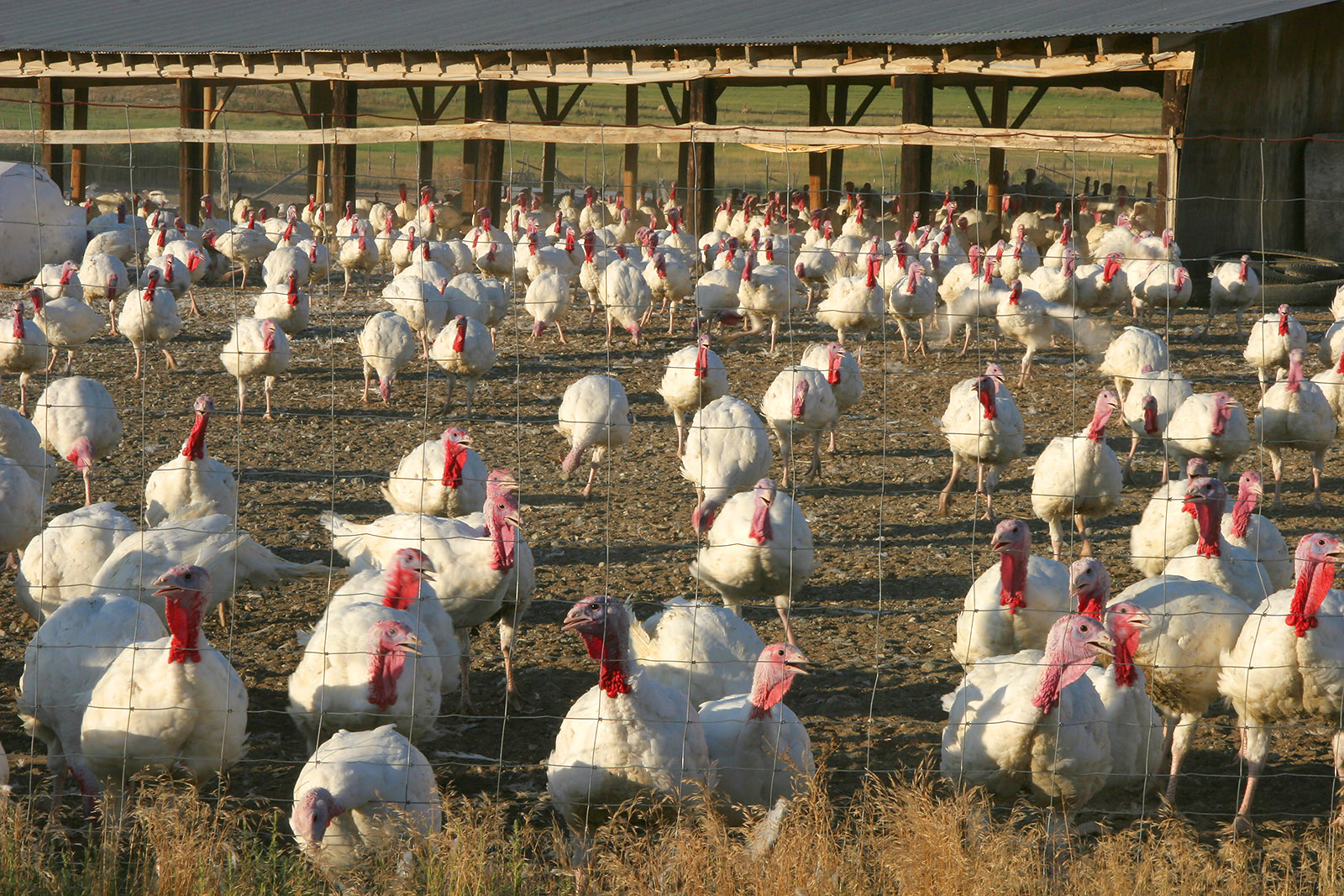
Turkeys in a typical holding pen in northern Sanpete County near Moroni

Sanpete County is a largely agricultural region of the state, dotted with rural farming towns. Agriculture, livestock, small businesses, government employment, and Snow College form the economic backbone of the county.

A significant industry in the county is turkey ranching and the Moroni Feed Company, a turkey producing and processing cooperative. Moroni Feed Company is a part owner of the marketing cooperative Norbest. Moroni Feed Company operates several divisions throughout the county, including a turkey processing plant, hatchery, feed mill, propane store, and sales office located in and near the town of Moroni. The company employs over 600 people throughout the state, with the corporate headquarters located near Moroni. Numerous turkey barns and sheds dot the landscape, primarily around Moroni and the other northern Sanpete towns.

Alfalfa fields and other animal feed crops make up the bulk of the agricultural activity and economy of the county.

== Communities ==
Map of Sanpete County communities

=== Cities ===
- Centerfield
- Ephraim
- Fairview
- Fountain Green
- Gunnison
- Manti (county seat)
- Moroni
- Mount Pleasant
- Spring City

=== Towns ===
- Fayette
- Mayfield
- Sterling
- Wales

=== Unincorporated communities ===
- Axtell
- Chester
- Christianburg
- Freedom
- Hideaway Valley
- Indianola
- Jerusalem
- Milburn
- Oak Creek
- Spearmint

=== Ghost towns ===
- Clarion
- Dover
- Manasseh

== Politics and government ==
Sanpete County has traditionally voted Republican. In no national election since 1936 has the county selected the Democratic Party candidate (as of 2024).

State elected offices
Position	District	Name	Affiliation	First elected
Senate	24	Derrin Owens	Republican	2020
House of Representatives	58	Steven J. Lund	Republican	2020
House of Representatives	70	Carl Albrecht	Republican	2016
Board of Education	14	Mark Huntsman	Nonpartisan	2014

United States presidential election results for Sanpete County, Utah
Year	Republican		Democratic		Third party(ies)	
Year	No.	%	No.	%	No.	%
1896	1,813	34.87%	3,387	65.13%	0	0.00%
1900	3,575	59.12%	2,441	40.37%	31	0.51%
1904	3,829	66.65%	1,741	30.30%	175	3.05%
1908	3,334	57.76%	2,307	39.97%	131	2.27%
1912	2,488	41.98%	1,984	33.47%	1,455	24.55%
1916	2,918	45.16%	3,382	52.34%	162	2.51%
1920	3,741	60.15%	2,406	38.69%	72	1.16%
1924	3,374	56.39%	2,228	37.24%	381	6.37%
1928	3,694	59.63%	2,482	40.06%	19	0.31%
1932	3,147	46.06%	3,600	52.69%	86	1.26%
1936	2,738	40.57%	3,959	58.67%	51	0.76%
1940	3,722	51.34%	3,524	48.61%	4	0.06%
1944	3,196	51.00%	3,071	49.00%	0	0.00%
1948	3,336	52.02%	3,041	47.42%	36	0.56%
1952	4,146	65.12%	2,221	34.88%	0	0.00%
1956	3,883	68.59%	1,778	31.41%	0	0.00%
1960	3,322	60.35%	2,180	39.60%	3	0.05%
1964	2,620	50.71%	2,547	49.29%	0	0.00%
1968	3,304	62.20%	1,696	31.93%	312	5.87%
1972	3,995	70.68%	1,220	21.59%	437	7.73%
1976	3,683	62.06%	1,925	32.43%	327	5.51%
1980	5,143	77.76%	1,260	19.05%	211	3.19%
1984	5,507	81.26%	1,227	18.11%	43	0.63%
1988	4,579	70.26%	1,822	27.96%	116	1.78%
1992	2,995	44.80%	1,302	19.48%	2,388	35.72%
1996	3,631	58.78%	1,568	25.38%	978	15.83%
2000	5,781	77.81%	1,211	16.30%	438	5.90%
2004	7,004	82.33%	1,189	13.98%	314	3.69%
2008	6,664	75.06%	1,631	18.37%	583	6.57%
2012	8,406	88.05%	980	10.27%	161	1.69%
2016	6,673	65.12%	1,061	10.35%	2,513	24.52%
2020	10,459	82.80%	1,794	14.20%	378	2.99%
2024	10,653	82.30%	1,906	14.72%	385	2.97%

== Education ==
There are two school districts: North Sanpete School District and South Sanpete School District.

== See also ==
- National Register of Historic Places listings in Sanpete County, Utah
- Sanpits Tribe
