= Gunnison, Utah =

City in Utah, United States

- City
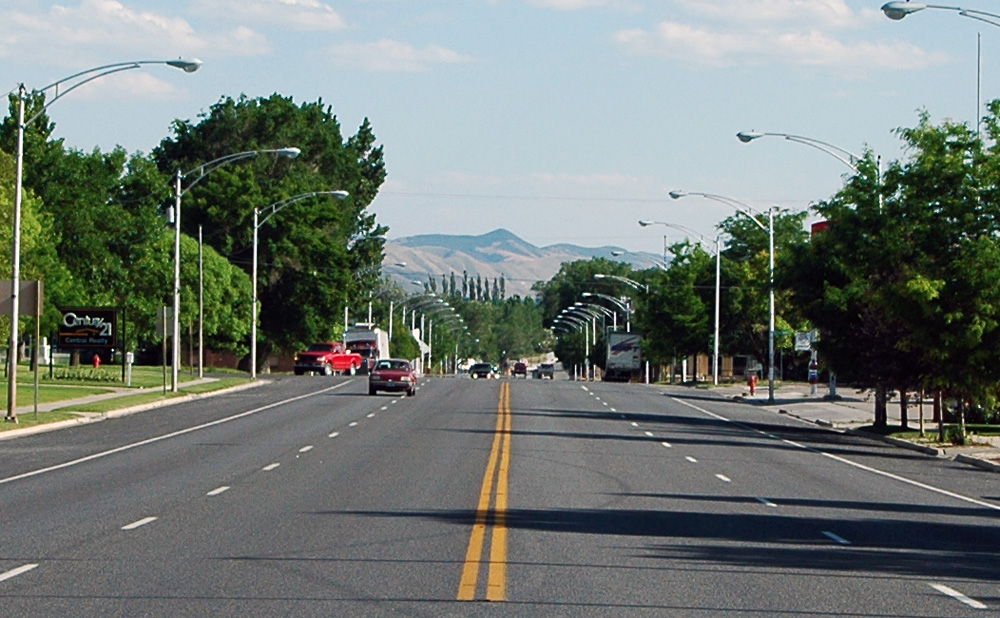
- Looking south down Gunnison's Main Street (US-89), June 2005

- Location in Sanpete County and the state of Utah.
- Coordinates: 39°9′19″N 111°49′6″W
- Country: United States
- State: Utah
- County: Sanpete
- Founded: 1859
- Named for: John Williams Gunnison

Area
  - Total: 4.79 sq mi (12.40 km^{2})
  - Land: 4.79 sq mi (12.40 km^{2})
  - Water: 0 sq mi (0.00 km^{2})
- Elevation: 5,138 ft (1,566 m)

Population (2020)
  - Total: 3,509
  - Density: 732.57/sq mi (282.85/km^{2})
- Time zone: UTC-7 (Mountain (MST))
  - Summer (DST): UTC-6 (MDT)
- ZIP code: 84634
- Area code: 435
- FIPS code: 49-32660
- GNIS feature ID: 1428432
- Website: www.gunnisoncityutah.org

Gunnison is a city in the Sevier Valley in southwestern Sanpete County, Utah, United States. The population was 3,509 at the 2020 census. The city was named in honor of John W. Gunnison, a United States Army officer who surveyed for the transcontinental railroad in 1853.

== History ==
=== 2007 gas spill ===
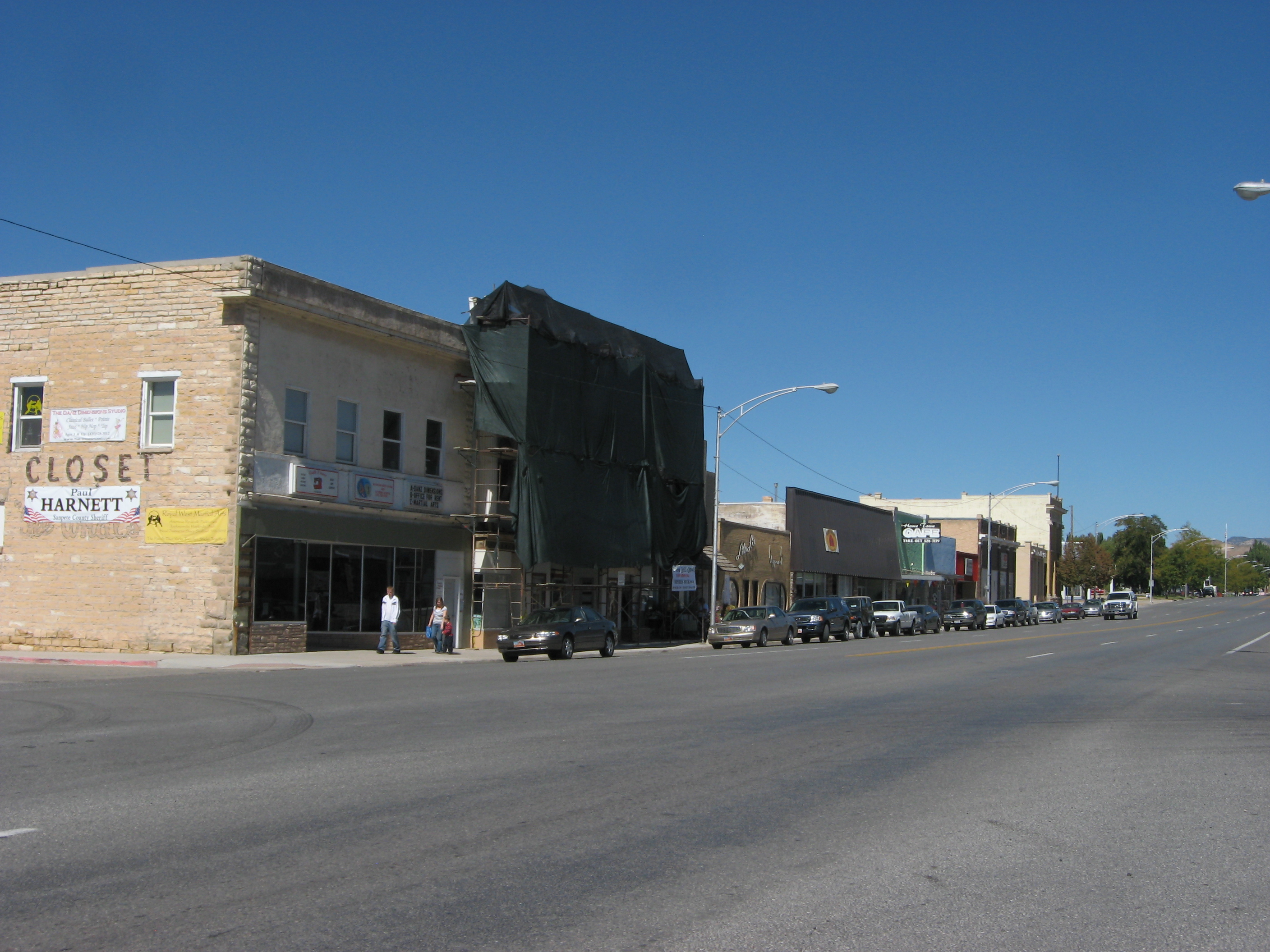
Looking north along the west side of Main Street (US-89) in Gunnison, September 2010

In the summer of 2007, over 24,000 US gallons (91,000 L) of gasoline leaked from a storage tank beneath the Top Stop gas station, located on the corner of South Main and East Center and owned by Wind River Petroleum. The gasoline leaked throughout the soil beneath South Main Street and eventually throughout the southwest side of town, contaminating businesses and homes. On August 10, 2007, local and state officials ordered the temporary evacuation of an entire Main Street block, heavily populated with businesses, because of the fumes from the gasoline leak. In the weeks following, Wasatch Environmental installed underground soil-ventilation systems. Several businesses, including the Top Stop, permanently closed, and some homes were evacuated. Gunnison City, along with several businesses and residents, filed suit against Wind River Petroleum over the handling of the gas leak. As of 2010, approximately $3 million ($1 million from a state cleanup fund, $2 million from Wind River Petroleum) had been spent on the cleanup, which is expected to last a decade. Gunnison City recently completed a Main Street rehabilitation project valued at over $1 million.

== Geography ==
According to the United States Census Bureau, the city has a total area of 5.3 square miles (14 km^{2}), all land.

Historical population
Census	Pop.	Note	%±
1870	475		—
1880	729		53.5%
1890	845		15.9%
1900	829		−1.9%
1910	950		14.6%
1920	1,115		17.4%
1930	1,057		−5.2%
1940	1,115		5.5%
1950	1,144		2.6%
1960	1,059		−7.4%
1970	1,073		1.3%
1980	1,255		17.0%
1990	1,298		3.4%
2000	2,394		84.4%
2010	3,285		37.2%
2020	3,509		6.8%
U.S. Decennial Census

== Demographics ==
Demographic data for Gunnison comes from the United States Census Bureau.

=== 2020 census ===
As of the 2020 census, Gunnison had a population of 3,509. The median age was 37.0 years. 17.0% of residents were under the age of 18 and 10.4% of residents were 65 years of age or older. For every 100 females there were 291.6 males, and for every 100 females aged 18 and over there were 368.0 males age 18 and over.

0.0% of residents lived in urban areas, while 100.0% lived in rural areas.

There were 622 households in Gunnison, of which 39.9% had children under the age of 18 living in them. Of all households, 63.7% were married-couple households, 15.8% were households with a male householder and no spouse or partner present, and 17.4% were households with a female householder and no spouse or partner present. About 18.8% of all households were made up of individuals and 9.7% had someone living alone who was 65 years of age or older.

There were 662 housing units, of which 6.0% were vacant. The homeowner vacancy rate was 1.2% and the rental vacancy rate was 5.6%.

Racial composition as of the 2020 census
Race	Number	Percent
White	2,769	78.9%
Black or African American	114	3.2%
American Indian and Alaska Native	99	2.8%
Asian	0	0.0%
Native Hawaiian and Other Pacific Islander	2	0.1%
Some other race	390	11.1%
Two or more races	135	3.8%
Hispanic or Latino (of any race)	496	14.1%

=== 2000 census ===
As of the 2000 census, there were 2,394 people, 513 households, and 410 families residing in the city. The population density was 451.9 people per square mile (174.4/km^{2}). There were 549 housing units at an average density of 103.6 per square mile (40.0/km^{2}). The racial makeup of the city was 88.35% White, 1.84% African American, 2.51% Native American, 0.79% Asian, 0.58% Pacific Islander, 3.97% from other races, and 8.00% from two or more races. Hispanic or Latino of any race were 7.10% of the population.

There were 513 households, out of which 45.2% had children under the age of 18 living with them, 72.1% were married couples living together, 6.4% had a female householder with no husband present, and 19.9% were non-families. 18.7% of all households were made up of individuals, and 12.1% had someone living alone who was 65 years or older. The average household size was 3.12, and the average family size was 3.59.

In the city, the population was spread out, with 25.3% under 18, 13.2% from 18 to 24, 33.8% from 25 to 44, 17.9% from 45 to 64, and 9.7% who were 65 years of age or older. The median age was 32 years. For every 100 females, there were 197.4 males. For every 100 females aged 18 and over, there were 240.6 males. The startling ratio of women to men is due to the presence of the Central Utah Correctional Facility, located one half mile northeast of downtown Gunnison. This state-run prison opened in 1990, has a capacity of 1500 inmates, and currently houses only male offenders.

The median income for a household in the city was $33,147, and the median income for a family was $37,500. Males had a median income of $27,207 versus $23,958 for females. The per capita income for the city was $14,537. About 9.8% of families and 11.0% of the population were below the poverty line, including 12.9% of those under age 18 and 10.9% of those aged 65 or over.

== Education ==
Gunnison is located in the South Sanpete School District, and has one elementary school, one middle school, and one high school, Gunnison Valley High School.

== See also ==
- List of cities and towns in Utah
- Gunnison Valley
