= Indianola, Utah =

Unincorporated community in the state of Utah, United States

Indianola
- Unincorporated community
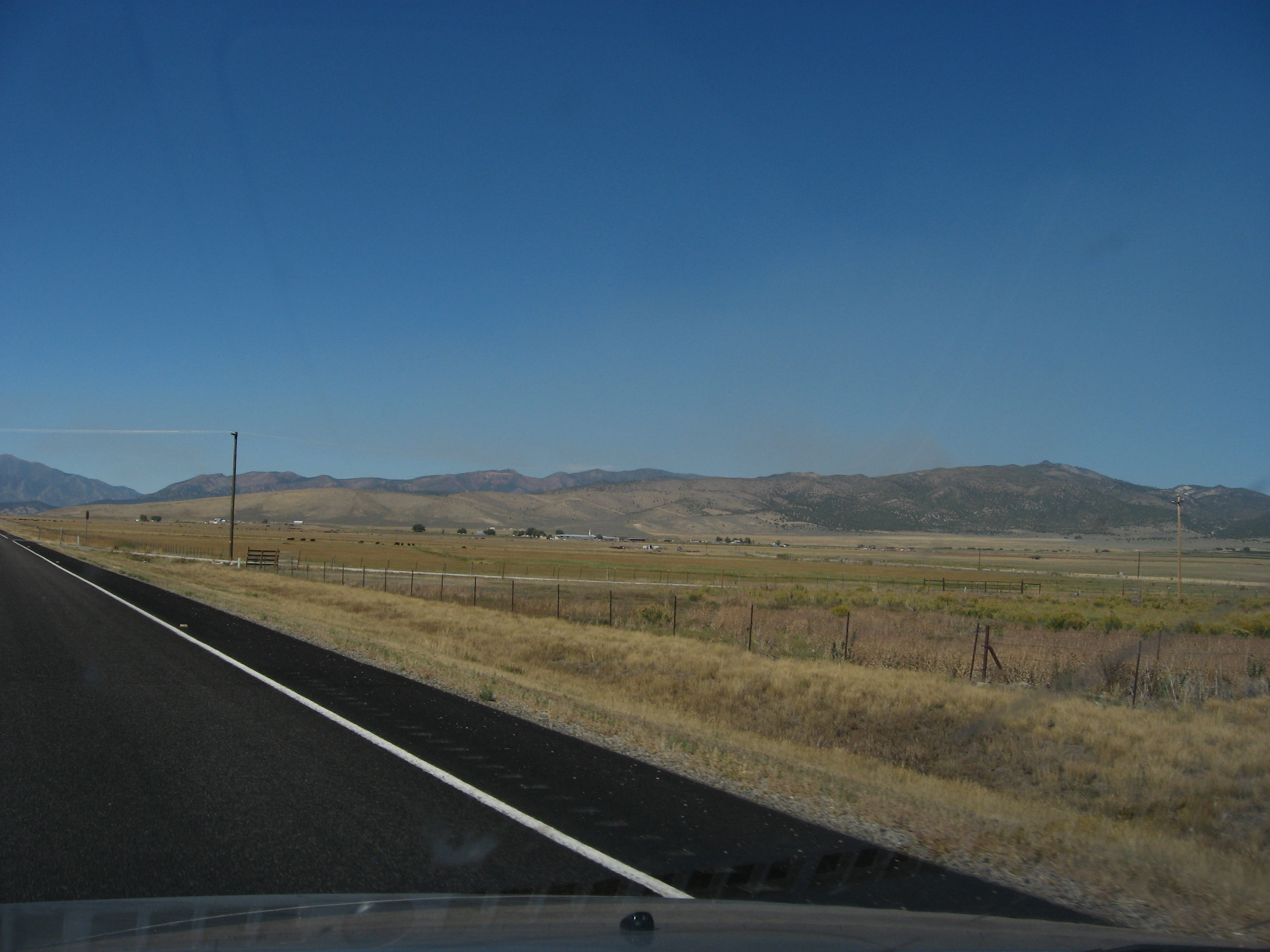
- Indianola in 2010

- Location within the state of Utah
- Coordinates: 39°48′11″N 111°29′20″W
- Country: United States
- State: Utah
- County: Sanpete
- Settled: 1871
- Elevation: 5,961 ft (1,817 m)
- Time zone: UTC-7 (Mountain (MST))
  - Summer (DST): UTC-6 (MDT)
- ZIP code: 84629
- Area code: 435
- GNIS feature ID: 1442039

Historical population
Census	Pop.	Note	%±
1890	148		—
1900	119		−19.6%
1910	127		6.7%
1920	222		74.8%
1930	114		−48.6%
1940	70		−38.6%
1950	61		−12.9%
Source: U.S. Census Bureau

Indianola is an unincorporated community in Sanpete County, Utah, United States, east of U.S. Route 89 at Thistle Creek and 12 miles (19 km) northeast of Fairview. An early Native American village existed here, and in pioneer times the site was selected for a Native American reservation.

The town of Indianola was settled in 1871.

== Climate ==
This climatic region is typified by large seasonal temperature differences, with warm to hot (and often humid) summers and cold (sometimes severely cold) winters. According to the Köppen Climate Classification system, Indianola has a humid continental climate, abbreviated "Dfb" on climate maps.
