= Sanpete County Courthouse =

- U.S. National Register of Historic Places
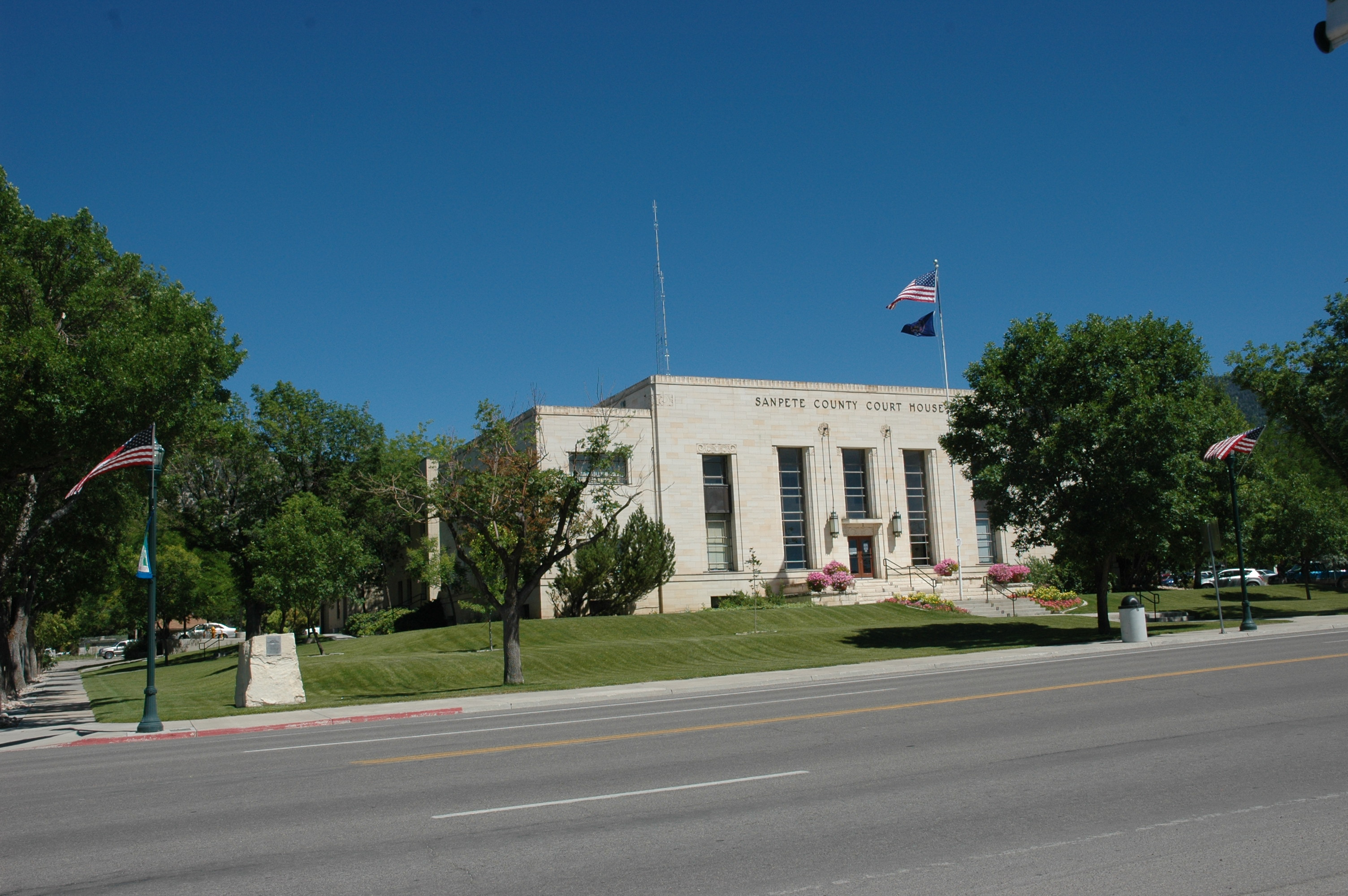

- Location within Utah Location within the United States
- Location: 160 N. Main St., Manti, Utah
- Coordinates: 39°16′05″N 111°38′09″W
- Area: less than one acre
- Built: 1935
- Architectural style: PWA Moderne
- MPS: Public Works Buildings TR
- NRHP reference No.: 85000811
- Added to NRHP: April 1, 1985

The Sanpete County Courthouse, at 160 N. Main St. in Manti, Utah, was built in 1935. It was listed on the National Register of Historic Places in 1985.

It was built of oolite limestone in PWA Moderne style. It has a two-story central block with vertical window panels and two two-story wings with horizontal window panels.

It was asserted to be "one of the best examples of the distinctive PWA Moderne architectural style in Utah."
