= Mayfield, Utah =

Town in the state of Utah, United States

- Town
- Location in Sanpete County and the state of Utah.
- Coordinates: 39°7′10″N 111°42′34″W
- Country: United States
- State: Utah
- County: Sanpete

Area
  - Total: 0.90 sq mi (2.33 km^{2})
  - Land: 0.90 sq mi (2.33 km^{2})
  - Water: 0 sq mi (0.00 km^{2})
- Elevation: 5,538 ft (1,688 m)

Population (2020)
  - Total: 556
  - Density: 618.0/sq mi (238.63/km^{2})
- Time zone: UTC-7 (Mountain (MST))
  - Summer (DST): UTC-6 (MDT)
- ZIP code: 84643
- Area code: 435
- FIPS code: 49-48720
- GNIS feature ID: 1443237
- Website: mayfieldtownut.gov

Mayfield is a town in southwestern Sanpete County, Utah, United States. The population was 556 at the 2020 census.

== History ==
Mayfield was settled in 1871. Some of the area's founding families included the Andersons, Petersons, Petersens, Bartholomews, Jensens, Sorensens, and Willdens. When the first white settlers arrived, they learned that this area was considered sacred by the Indians, who said it was a "healing ground." It is said that no fighting has ever occurred in Mayfield.

== Geography ==
According to the United States Census Bureau, the town has a total area of 0.8 square miles (2.1 km^{2}), all land.

Historical population
Census	Pop.	Note	%±
1880	330		—
1890	337		2.1%
1900	469		39.2%
1910	485		3.4%
1920	550		13.4%
1930	467		−15.1%
1940	473		1.3%
1950	390		−17.5%
1960	329		−15.6%
1970	267		−18.8%
1980	397		48.7%
1990	438		10.3%
2000	420		−4.1%
2010	496		18.1%
2020	556		12.1%
U.S. Decennial Census

== Demographics ==
As of the census of 2000, there were 420 people, 141 households, and 106 families residing in the town. The population density was 501.7 people per square mile (193.1/km^{2}). There were 164 housing units at an average density of 195.9 per square mile (75.4/km^{2}). The racial makeup of the town was 97.62% White, 1.67% Native American, 0.48% from other races, and 0.24% from two or more races. Hispanic or Latino of any race were 1.19% of the population.

There were 141 households, out of which 34.0% had children under the age of 18 living with them, 66.0% were married couples living together, 6.4% had a female householder with no husband present, and 24.8% were non-families. 22.7% of all households were made up of individuals, and 14.2% had someone living alone who was 65 years of age or older. The average household size was 2.71 and the average family size was 3.24.

In the town, the population was spread out, with 26.7% under the age of 18, 5.5% from 18 to 24, 21.2% from 25 to 44, 23.3% from 45 to 64, and 23.3% who were 65 years of age or older. The median age was 43 years. For every 100 females, there were 88.3 males. For every 100 females age 18 and over, there were 81.2 males.

The median income for a household in the town was $41,500, and the median income for a family was $46,250. Males had a median income of $28,750 versus $21,875 for females. The per capita income for the town was $16,748. About 2.7% of families and 3.8% of the population were below the poverty line, including none of those under age 18 and 15.2% of those age 65 or over.

== Education ==
It is in the South Sanpete School District.

== See also ==
- List of cities and towns in Utah
