= Centerfield, Utah =

City in Utah, United States

- City
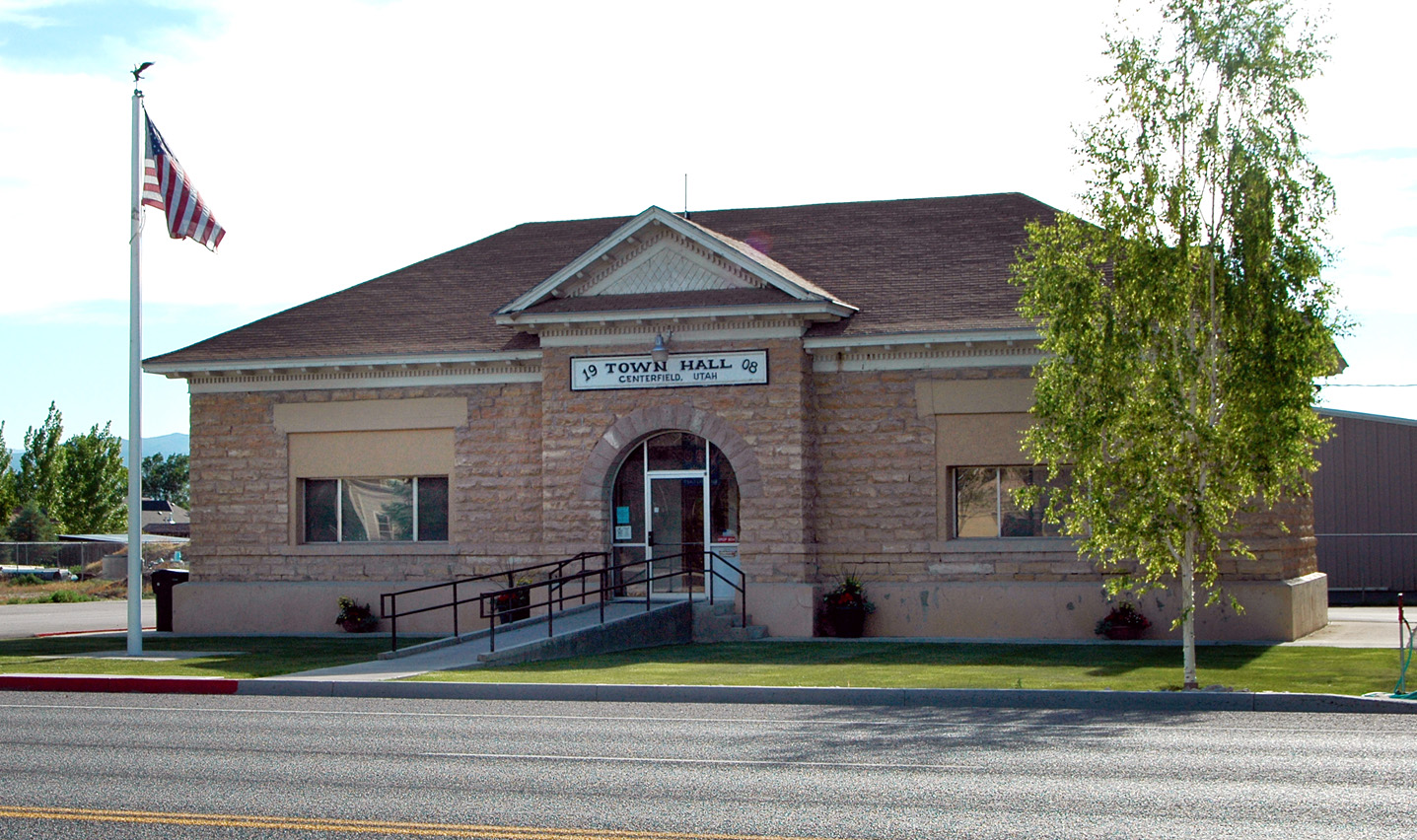
- Centerfield City Hall, June 2005

- Location in Sanpete County and the state of Utah.
- Coordinates: 39°7′32″N 111°49′5″W
- Country: United States
- State: Utah
- County: Sanpete
- Settled: 1869
- Incorporated: 1909

Area
  - Total: 1.90 sq mi (4.93 km^{2})
  - Land: 1.90 sq mi (4.93 km^{2})
  - Water: 0 sq mi (0.00 km^{2})
- Elevation: 5,099 ft (1,554 m)

Population (2020)
  - Total: 1,341
  - Density: 704.5/sq mi (272.01/km^{2})
- Time zone: UTC-7 (Mountain (MST))
  - Summer (DST): UTC-6 (MDT)
- ZIP code: 84622
- Area code: 435
- FIPS code: 49-11870
- GNIS feature ID: 1426506
- Website: www.centerfieldcityut.gov

Centerfield is a city in southwestern Sanpete County, Utah, United States. The population was 1,341 at the 2020 census. Although Centerfield was a town in 2000, it has since been classified as a fifth-class city by state law. The community was so named because of its location in the center of a wide valley.

== Geography ==
According to the United States Census Bureau, the city has a total area of 1.8 square miles (4.7 km^{2}), all land.

=== Climate ===
According to the Köppen Climate Classification system, Centerfield has a semi-arid climate, abbreviated "BSk" on climate maps.

== Demographics ==
Historical population
Census	Pop.	Note	%±
1910	841		—
1920	566		−32.7%
1930	554		−2.1%
1940	598		7.9%
1950	601		0.5%
1960	475		−21.0%
1970	419		−11.8%
1980	653		55.8%
1990	766		17.3%
2000	1,048		36.8%
2010	1,367		30.4%
2020	1,341		−1.9%
U.S. Decennial Census

As of the census of 2000, there were 1,048 people, 310 households, and 252 families residing in the town. The population density was 581.6 people per square mile (224.8/km^{2}). There were 343 housing units at an average density of 190.3 per square mile (73.6/km^{2}). The racial makeup of the town was 92.94% White, 0.86% Native American, 0.10% Asian, 4.87% from other races, and 1.24% from two or more races. Hispanic or Latino of any race were 8.49% of the population.

Of the 310 households, 51.3% had children under 18 living with them, 68.1% were married couples living together, 10.0% had a female householder with no husband present, and 18.4% were non-families. Also, 17.4% of all households were made up of individuals, and 9.4% had someone living alone who was 65 years of age or older. The average household size was 3.38 people, and the average family size was 3.83.

In the town, the population was spread out, with 39.7% under 18, 10.5% from 18 to 24, 23.6% from 25 to 44, 17.9% from 45 to 64, and 8.3% who were 65 years of age or older. The median age was 25 years. For every 100 females, there were 103.9 males. For every 100 females aged 18 and over, there were 96.9 males.

The median income for a household in the town was $35,357, and the median income for a family was $38,462. Males had a median income of $30,795 versus $17,917 for females. The per capita income was $12,270. About 15.2% of families and 16.7% of the population were below the poverty line, including 19.1% of those under age 18 and 16.9% of those aged 65 or over.

== History ==
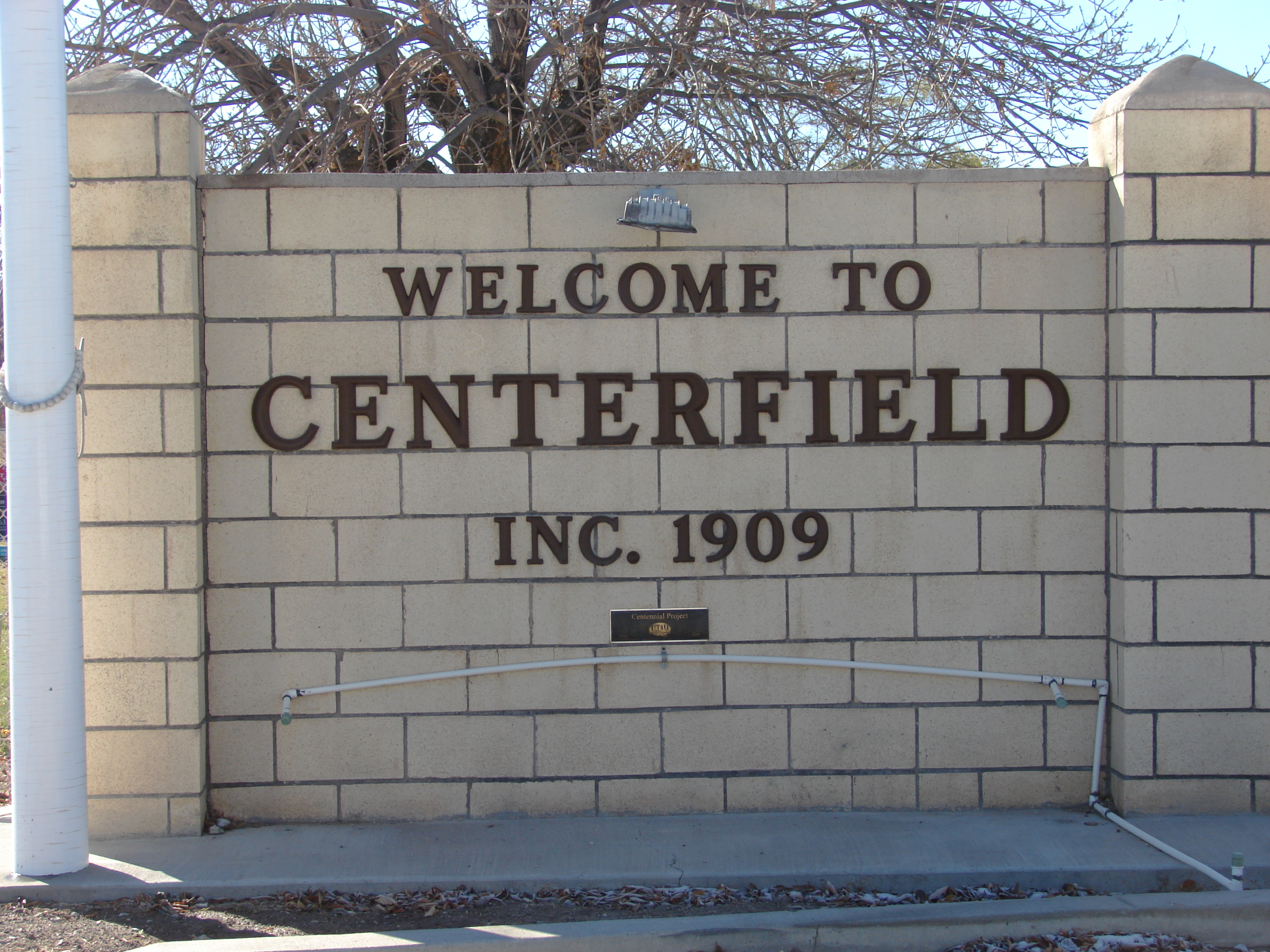
Welcome to Centerfield sign, November 2015

Centerfield was first known as Skin Town. It seems that about 1880, a new method for tanning cowhides was discovered and implemented in New York. At the same time, Sanpete suffered a terrible winter with such deep snow that many cattle couldn't find enough forage and died. In order to keep their operations from being a total loss, the ranchers skinned the cows, used the new tanning method on the hides, and hung them out on their fences to dry. The fact that all the fences were draped with cowhides led to the name “Skin Town”. It was also called South Gunnison or Twin Town. When the town was incorporated in 1907, the residents chose the more dignified name of Centerfield because of the community's central location.

Centerfield is an 1860s offshoot of Gunnison that evolved two miles south on US 89. Gunnison Field or Gunnison South was a natural site for farmers who worked small “squatters rights” plots of about five acres with oxen and hand plows. After the Indian troubles subsided, log and adobe houses began to appear. A late 1876 petition to ‘build a school convenient to our location’ was an early sign of independence from the mother colony. In 1882 a log cabin was built to serve as a school, church, and social hall. The 1886-87 church was built of stone, and a front tower was added in 1897. Community spirit was strong by that time, and Canute Peterson chose a committee of four who named the place for its location in the fields between Gunnison and Axtell.

=== Gunnison Valley Sugar Company ===
The Gunnison Valley Sugar Company built a 500-ton factory in Centerfield, Utah, in 1918. The Centerfield factory equipment came from the Washington State Sugar Company plant in Waverly, Washington. The Waverly factory, which opened in December 1899, was considered unprofitable and inferior. The Utah Sugar management, including Cutler, advised Washington Sugar in 1901 for the 1902 season, but the factory closed in 1910. It was sold to Gunnison Sugar for $100,000, installed in Centerfield in 1917, and was ready for the 1918 campaign. U-I went on an aggressive anti-competitive campaign (including spreading rumors, leading to U-I's investigation by the FTC) against Gunnison Valley Sugar Company. In 1920, the William Wrigley Jr. Company purchased the factory to supply their chewing gum production. U-I acquired the Centerfield factory and company in 1940. They closed the factory in 1956, re-opened it from 1958 to 1961, then sold it as scrap in April 1966.

== Education ==
It is in the South Sanpete School District.

== See also ==
- List of cities and towns in Utah
