= Fayette, Utah =

- Town
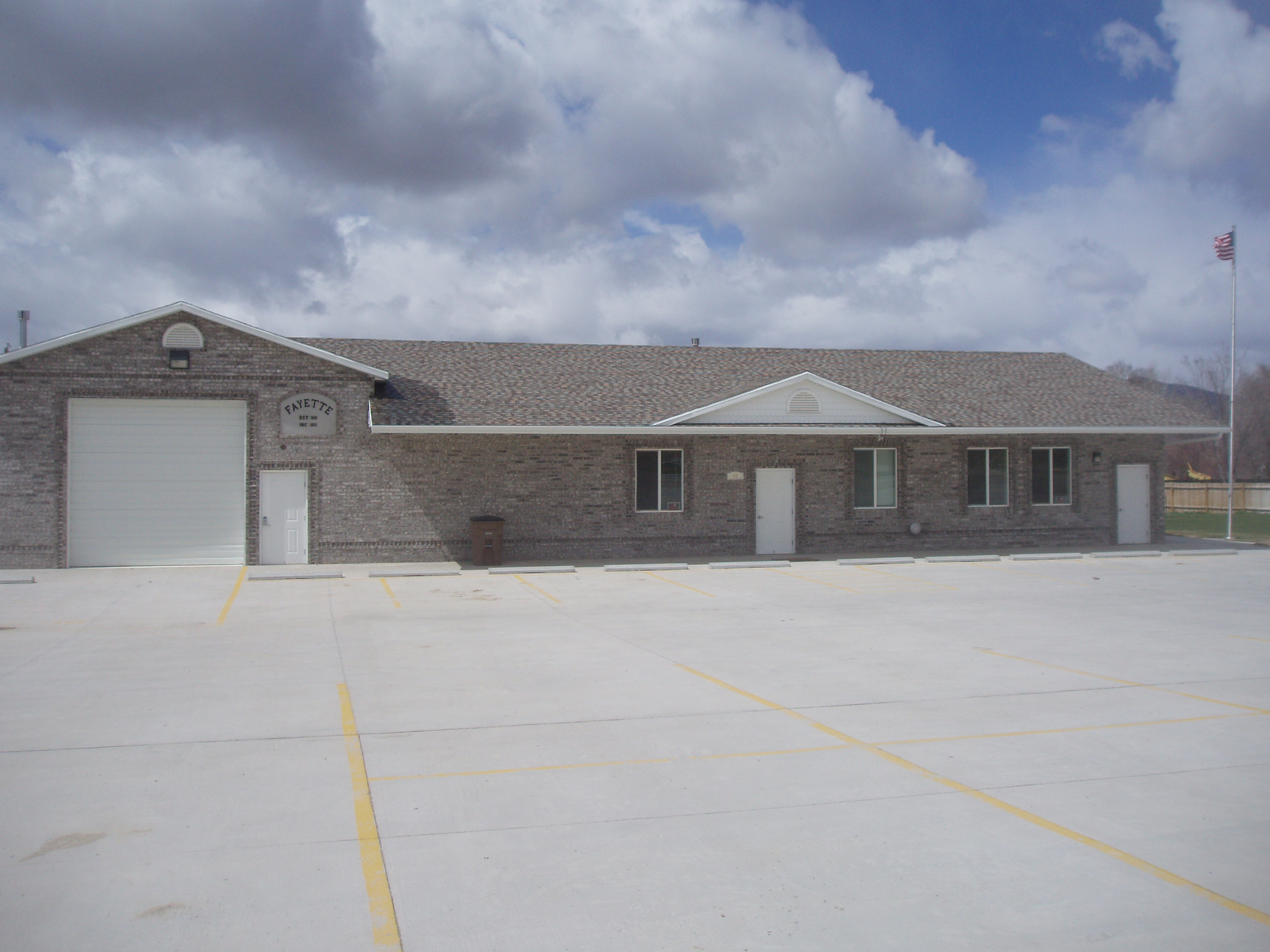
- Fayette Town Hall, April 2010

- Location in Sanpete County and the state of Utah.
- Coordinates: 39°13′29″N 111°51′20″W
- Country: United States
- State: Utah
- County: Sanpete
- Settled: 1861
- Incorporated: 1948
- Founder: James Mellor and Joseph Bartholomew
- Named for: Fayette, New York

Area
  - Total: 0.39 sq mi (1.02 km^{2})
  - Land: 0.39 sq mi (1.02 km^{2})
  - Water: 0 sq mi (0.00 km^{2})
- Elevation: 5,050 ft (1,540 m)

Population (2020)
  - Total: 245
  - Density: 622/sq mi (240.2/km^{2})
- Time zone: UTC-7 (Mountain (MST))
  - Summer (DST): UTC-6 (MDT)
- ZIP code: 84630
- Area code: 435
- FIPS code: 49-25070
- GNIS feature ID: 1427897
- Website: fayetteutah.gov

Fayette is a town in Sanpete County, Utah, United States. The population was 245 at the 2020 census.

== History ==
Founded in 1861, Fayette was originally called "Warm Creek". A post office called Fayette was in operation between 1864 and 1966. The present name is after Fayette, New York, the town where the LDS Church was founded.

== Geography ==
According to the United States Census Bureau, the town has a total area of 0.5 square mile (1.2 km^{2}), all land.

== Demographics ==
Historical population
Census	Pop.	Note	%±
1880	278		—
1890	305		9.7%
1900	290		−4.9%
1910	209		−27.9%
1920	261		24.9%
1930	260		−0.4%
1940	271		4.2%
1950	200		−26.2%
1960	161		−19.5%
1970	93		−42.2%
1980	165		77.4%
1990	183		10.9%
2000	204		11.5%
2010	242		18.6%
2020	245		1.2%
U.S. Decennial Census

As of the census of 2000, there were 204 people, 64 households, and 49 families residing in the town. The population density was 421.2 people per square mile (164.1/km^{2}). There were 73 housing units at an average density of 150.7 per square mile (58.7/km^{2}). The racial makeup of the town was 91.18% White, 2.45% Native American, 4.41% from other races, and 1.96% from two or more races. Hispanic or Latino of any race were 4.41% of the population.

There were 64 households, out of which 46.9% had children under the age of 18 living with them, 70.3% were married couples living together, 3.1% had a female householder with no husband present, and 21.9% were non-families. 21.9% of all households were made up of individuals, and 14.1% had someone living alone who was 65 years or older. The average household size was 3.19, and the average family size was 3.78.

In the town, the population was spread out, with 36.8% under 18, 10.3% from 18 to 24, 19.6% from 25 to 44, 20.1% from 45 to 64, and 13.2% who were 65 years of age or older. The median age was 30 years. For every 100 females, there were 98.1 males. For every 100 females aged 18 and over, there were 92.5 males.

The median income for a household in the town was $28,750, and the median income for a family was $36,500. Males had a median income of $28,750 versus $23,750 for females. The per capita income was $17,459. About 4.8% of families and 9.8% of the population were below the poverty line, including 9.7% of those under eighteen and none of those 65 or over.

== Education ==
It is in the South Sanpete School District.

== See also ==
- List of cities and towns in Utah
