= Native American people and Mormonism =

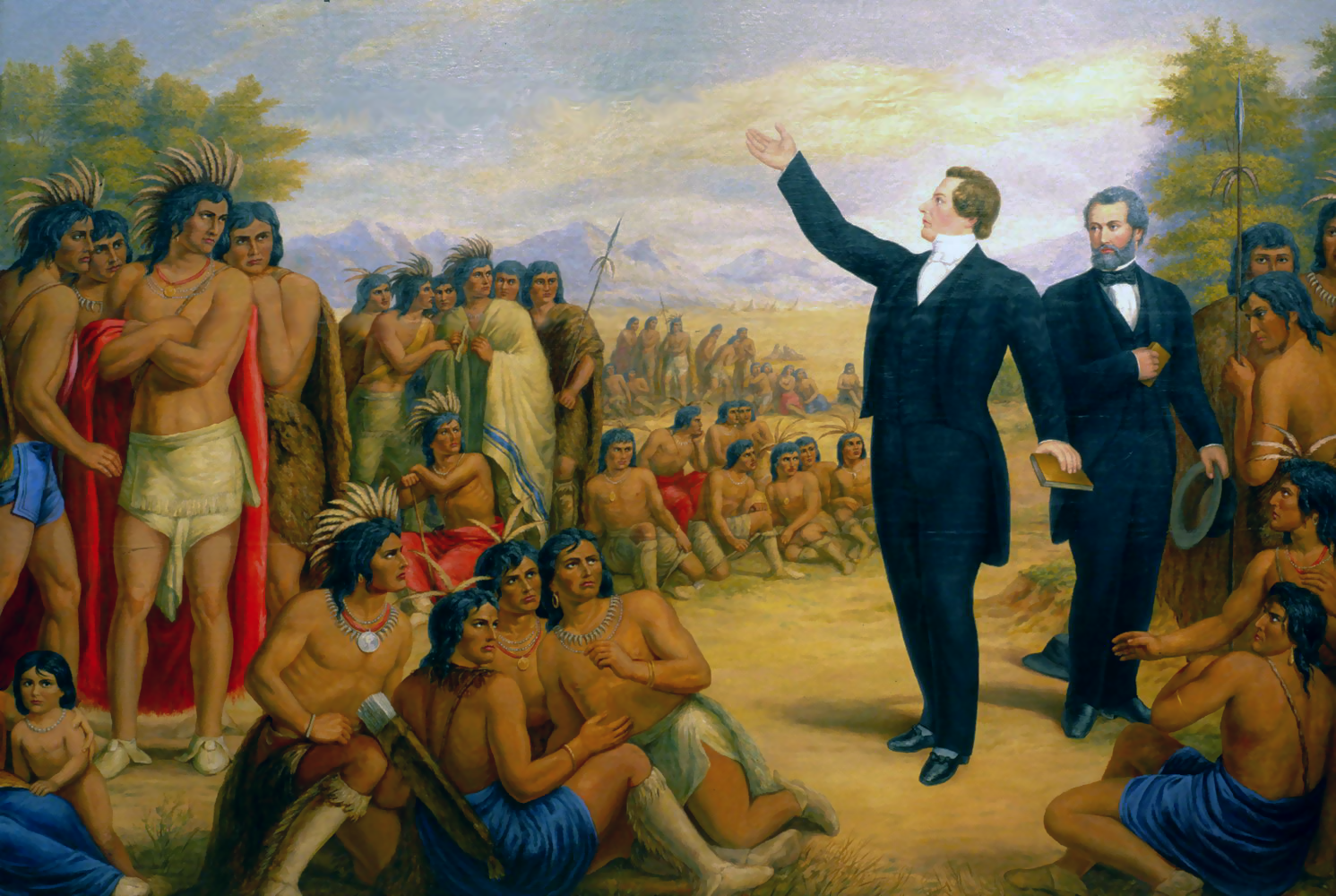
Painting which hung in the Salt Lake Temple of Mormon founder Joseph Smith preaching to Native Americans in Illinois

Over the past two centuries, the relationship between Native American people and Mormonism has included friendly ties, displacement, violence, enslavement, education placement programs, and official and unofficial discrimination. Native American people (also called American Indians) were historically considered a special group by adherents of the Latter Day Saint movement (Mormons) since they were believed to be the descendants of the Lamanite people described in one of the faith's book of scriptures, the Book of Mormon. There is no support from genetic studies and archaeology for the historicity of the Book of Mormon or Middle Eastern origins for any Native American peoples.

The founder of Mormonism, Joseph Smith, formed proselyting efforts among Native American tribes within six month of organizing his church in 1830 in upstate New York. These efforts continued over the next two decades as church headquarters moved to various Midwestern States. The church allowed some interracial marriages between White and Native American adherents.

A while after Smith was killed in Illinois, the majority of his followers sided with Brigham Young as his successor. Young and followers began moving west as Mormon pioneers to the Intermountain West frontier in 1847, where they both formed alliances with and warred with the 20,000 existing Native American people there. These violent confrontations included massacres (Battle Creek, Provo River, Skull Valley, Nephi, Grass Valley, Circleville, Fountain Green, and Salt Creek) and wars (Black Hawk, Ute, Wakara's, and Posey). Young officially legalized Native American slavery in the Utah Territory in 1852, and within a decade over 400 Native American children were purchased and used as a vital source of labor in Mormon homes until slavery was banned by the federal government in 1865. Within 50 years of Mormon settlement under Young and his successors John Taylor then Wilford Woodruff, the Native American population in what is now Utah was decimated by 86%, and made up only 1.6% of Utah's population in 1890. About 30 White LDS men married Native American women during the LDS colonizing of Utah Territory.

In the 20th century, the church operated the Indian Placement Program from 1954 to 1996, with its peak during the 1960s and 1970s. The number of Native North American adherents of Mormonism grew to 45,000 by 1977. During this time church leaders continued to teach that the skin color of Native Americans was a result of a curse from God and that through following church teachings their skin color would be lightened. In the 21st century these teachings, along with those against interracial marriage were officially renounced for the first time in 2013. Today there are many Native American members of Mormon denominations. There are also many people critical of Mormonism and its teachings and actions around Native American people.

== History ==
=== Under Joseph Smith ===
The founder of Mormonism, Joseph Smith, was fascinated by Native Americans from an early age. Scholars Lori Taylor and Peter Manseau believe religious teachings of then deceased Handsome Lake relayed through his nephew Red Jacket near Smith's town influenced the 16-year-old Smith. Smith later stated that in 1823 a Native American angel visited him and told him about a record that contained an ancient history of Native Americans. Smith said he translated this record from golden plates to the Book of Mormon. Smith stated in the 1842 Wentworth Letter to a Chicago newspaper editor that the book was "the history of ancient America ... from its first settlement by a colony that came from the Tower of Babel ... to the beginning of [400 CE] ... The remnant are the Indians that now inhabit this country." Throughout the 1800s, adherents cited the common belief of White Christians at the time that Native Americans were "red sons of Israel" descended from the lost tribes as evidence of the authenticity of the Book of Mormon account.

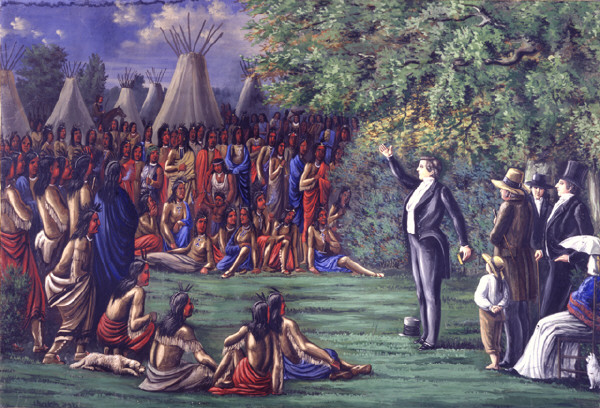
Artist's depiction of Joseph Smith preaching to the Sac and Fox Indians who visited Nauvoo, Illinois, in 1841

Adherents saw Native Americans as part of God's chosen people and they believed that preaching to them was part of the gathering of Israel which will precede the millennium. The church's long history with Native Americans is tied to their beliefs about the Book of Mormon. According to sociologist Marcie Goodman, historically Latter Day Saints held paternalistic beliefs about Native Americans needing help. Outreach to Native Americans became the first mission of Smith's newly organized Church of Christ, as the purpose of the Book of Mormon was to recover the lost remnant of the ancient children of Israel (e.g. Native Americans). Smith sent prominent members Oliver Cowdery, Parley Pratt, Peter Whitmer, Jr., and Ziba Peterson to a "Lamanite Mission" only six months after organizing the church. Though they did not have any converts and reception was lukewarm among the Seneca, Wyandot, and Shawnee people, they were well received by the Delaware people because the Book of Mormon advocated for a divine destiny for Native Americans and a divine right to their territory in the American "promised land".

During the 1840s, Smith sent missionaries to the Sioux (Dakota), Potawatomi (Bodéwadmi), and Stockbridge (Mahican) people in Wisconsin and Canada. Additionally, representatives from the Sauk (Asakiwaki) and Fox (Meskwaki) people met with Smith at the Latter Day Saint headquarters in Nauvoo, Illinois. Smith was quoted in a Nauvoo Council of Fifty meeting as stating "If the Lamanites won't hearken to our council, they shall be oppressed & killed until they will do it." Counselor Orson Spencer stated subsequently that "The gospel to [Native Americans] is, they have been killed and scattered in consequence of their rejecting the everlasting Priesthood, and if they will return to the Priesthood and hearken to council, they shall have council enough, that shall save both them and us." Later, Potawatomi leaders asked the Mormons to join them in an alliance with some other tribes, but Smith declined. The governor of Iowa John Chambers was wary of these meetings which were reported to him by interpreter Hitchcock, as Chambers believed Smith was "an exceedingly vain and vindictive fellow" who might use an alliance with Potowatomi people to start a conflict to seek revenge against Missouri.

=== Under Brigham Young ===
After Smith's death and six months of a succession crisis, Brigham Young became leader of the majority of Smith's followers and the largest denomination in the Latter Day Saint movement, The Church of Jesus Christ of Latter-day Saints (LDS Church). Young discussed an alliance with some Native American nations with other top leaders but these efforts were abandoned in 1846 as Young's followers were preparing to migrate west. According to former Church Historian and emeritus church Seventy Marlin Jensen, before Mormon colonization of the region there were about 20,000 Native American people in the Great Basin. These included the Shoshone, Goshute, Ute, Paiute, and Navajo nations. The settlers initially had some peaceful relations, but because resources were scarce in the desert, hostilities broke out. As tens of thousands of LDS colonizers arrived and took over the land, and resources Native Americans had used for thousands of years diminished, native nations felt they had to resist for their survival. By the 1850s there were already hundreds of Mormon colonial settlements made in the Mountain West stretching hundreds of miles from Idaho to Southern California, and Young petitioned the federal government to remove all Native people to distant reservations.

==== Relationship during Utah War ====
Mormon relations with Native Americans were a significant factor in President Buchanan's decision to order the U.S. army to Utah, beginning a conflict that would later be called the Utah War. Brigham Young and other church leaders taught that by accepting baptism and intermarriage with Mormons, Native Americans would fulfill a Book of Mormon prophecy that Lamanites would return to the House of Israel. While it is no longer a core tenet of the Latter-day faith, at the time leaders taught that "the time had arrived when all the wicked should be destroyed from the face of the earth, and that the Indians would be the principal means by which this object should be accomplished." Gaining Native American allies was a key part of Brigham Young's strategy to maintain independence from the United States.

In 1855 Brigham Young called 160 missionaries to preach to North American Native Americans from the west coast to the Mississippi; over the next three years at least three hundred missionaries would construct mission forts among tribes along major immigration trails. In a report to the commissioner of Indian affairs, Garland Hurt wrote, "There is perhaps not a tribe on the continent that will not be visited... [to create] a distinction in the minds of the Indian tribes of this Territory between the Mormons and the people of the United States." Reports from Indian agents across the country confirmed Hurt's statements. Furthermore, in the spring of 1857, Brigham Young violated federal law when he travelled outside of his jurisdiction as Utah's Superintendent of Indian affairs to meet with Native American leaders throughout the Oregon territory and give them gifts, which he later falsely reported were presents he gave to Indians in Utah.

Federal law made it a crime to alienate Indians from the United States government, and the president had the power to use military force to stop anyone attempting to do so. As continuing problems from the territory became harder for US politicians to ignore, Stephen A. Douglas stated that "The Mormon Government, with Brigham Young at its head, is now forming alliance with Indian tribes in Utah and adjoining territories--stimulating the Indians to acts of hostility." Despite public denials of this accusation, Nauvoo Legion commanders were concurrently ordered to warn Native Americans that they must unite together with the Mormons against the US government or be killed off by Americans separately. As Brigham Young cut off emigration routes between the Eastern states and California (blaming Native American violence for the closures) President Buchanan ordered the US army to escort a new governor and Superintendent of Indian Affairs to the Utah territory.

Ultimately, while Mormons were able to establish some alliances with Southern Paiute tribes, the refusal of tribes in the north of Utah disrupted one of Brigham Young's primary war strategies. In particular, Young was taken by surprise by the Bannock and Shoshone attack on the Mormon missionary Fort Lemhi for the benefit of the US troops. This miscalculation of Native American alliances led him to begin overtures of peace with the US army.

==== Young's policies after the Utah War ====
By 1860 the population of Mormon migrants in Utah had grown to 40,000 and within another ten years that number had doubled to 86,000. By 1890 Native Americans made up only 1.6% of Utah's population. Over a century later in 2010 that number had remained about the same at 1.3%. Within 50 years of Mormon settlement the population of Utah's Native Americans had gone from 20,000 to under 2,700, a large decline of 86%. Young stated, "towards so degraded and ignorant a race of people, it was manifestly more economical and less expensive, to feed and clothe, than fight them."

In 1865 Young and Utah's Superintendent of Indian Affairs O. H. Irish met with Ute leaders Kanosh, Sanpitch, and Soweitte to pressure them to leave Utah Valley. Young stated, "If you do not sell your land to the Government, they will take it, ... we shall increase, and we shall occupy this valley and the next, and the next, and so on til' we occupy the whole of them." By 1869, all the original inhabitants of Utah Valley had been removed. Of the monumental LDS colonization of the Intermountain West LDS leader Jensen stated, "Regardless of how one views the equities of Indian-Mormon relations in those times, the end result was that the land and cultural birthright Indians once possessed in the Great Basin were taken from them. ... [T]he least we can do from a distance of 160 years, is to acknowledge and appreciate the monumental loss this represents on the part of Utah's Indians. That loss and its 160-year aftermath are the rest of the story."

Young taught that cursed racial lineages were in a three-tiered classification of redemption with Lamanites (Native Americans) on top, Jewish people in the middle, and Cain's descendants (Black people) on the bottom. This corresponded to the time when they would each receive the gospel, with Native Americans in the foreseeable future, Jewish people after they were gathered at the Second Coming of Jesus Christ, and Black people in the afterlife during the resurrection. Young sent Jacob Hamblin as a leader for several missionary efforts among Great Basin Native Americans resulting in important Hopi conversion of Chief Tuba.

In the 1890s, James Mooney of the Smithsonian Institution of the Bureau of American Ethnology, and Missouri military commander Nelson Miles, placed some blame on Mormon settlers for the events that precipitated the Wounded Knee Massacre. Some later scholars perpetuated these ideas, however, historical evidence does not support them.

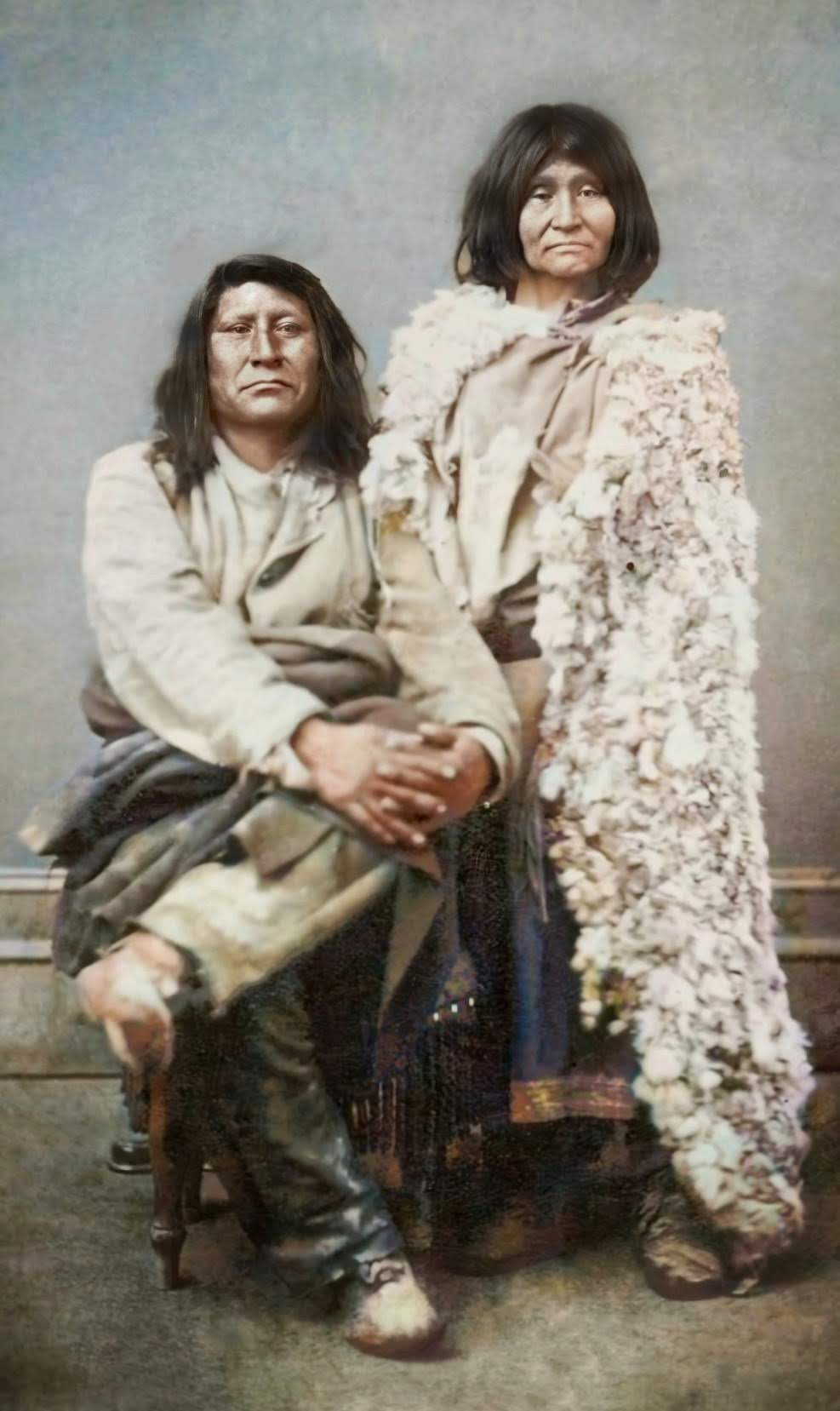
Chief Sagwitch and spouse Beawoachee, circa 1875

Though, nearly killed by US soldiers in the 1863 Bear River Massacre, Chief Sagwitch became a notable ally of Young and church member by 1873. 100 of his people were also baptized into the LDS Church, and they settled and farmed in Washakie, Utah. They also contributed large amounts of labor towards the building of the Logan Utah Temple in the 1870s and 80s. Sagwitch's grandson Moroni became the first Native American bishop in the LDS Church.

=== 20th Century ===
During the century between 1835 and 1947 the official LDS hymnbook had lyrics discussing Native Americans which included the following statements: "And so our race has dwindled/ To idle Indian hearts ... And all your captive brothers/ From every clime shall come/ And quit their savage customs", "Great spirit listen to the Red Man's wail! ... Not many moons shall pass away before/ the curse of darkness from your skins shall flee". In 1975 George P. Lee became the first Native American LDS general authority, though he was excommunicated in 1989, and later pleaded guilty in 1994 to having groped a young girl. By 1977 the LDS Church stated that there were almost 45,000 Native American members in the US and Canada (a number larger than any other Christian denomination except the Roman Catholic Church). In the latter half of the 20th century, the LDS Church sold lands that had served as settlements for Native American church members to private interests, as at Washakie, and the Natives were forced to move to other reservations or into nearby towns.

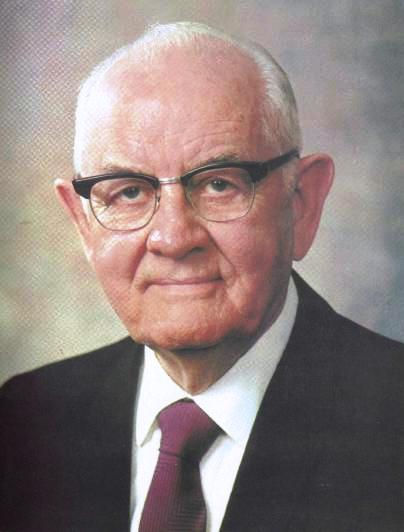
Spencer Kimball was an influential leader in church relations with Native Americans.

Beginning in 1945 then apostle Spencer Kimball was assigned to be over church relations with Native Americans, and he would go on to become president of the church and was very influential in church actions and teachings around Native Americans for four decades until his death in 1985. Twentieth century teachings connecting modern Native Americans and Lamanites reached their height under the presidency of Spencer W. Kimball (1973 –1985), then declined, but did not disappear. For example in 1967, then apostle (later church president) Kimball stated that Native Americans were descendants of Middle Eastern settlers who traveled over the ocean, and were "not Orientals" of East Asian origin, further quoting a previous First Presidency proclamation which said God, "has revealed the origin and the records of the aboriginal tribes of America, and their future destiny.-And we know it."

Kimball definitively stated in 1971, "The term Lamanite includes all Indians and Indian mixtures, such as the Polynesians ...." and, "the Lamanites number about sixty million; they are in all of the states of America from Tierra del Fuego all the way up to Point Barrows, and they are in nearly all the islands of the sea from Hawaii south to southern New Zealand." The 1981 edition of the Book of Mormon said Lamanites "are the principal ancestors of the American Indians". No evidence of the large civilizations or battles described in Book of Mormon have been found by anthropologists and archaeologists, and DNA studies of Native Americans show that they came from Asia during the latest ice age, and not from the Middle East.

=== 21st Century ===
The LDS Church altered statements after 2007 to say that Lamanites are "among the ancestors" rather than the "principal ancestors" of Native Americans. Church manuals state that Christopher Columbus was inspired by God to sail to the Americas, and the Book of Mormon teaches that because the Lamanites sinned against God, they lost their lands and became "scattered and smitten". LDS-raised and ethnically native Alaskan Sarah Newcomb stated that this framing excuses the genocide of Native Americans during the post-Columbus European colonization of the Americas. In 2021 an offered $2 million donation by the church to the First Americans Museum for a Native American family history center was declined.

== Native American enslavement ==
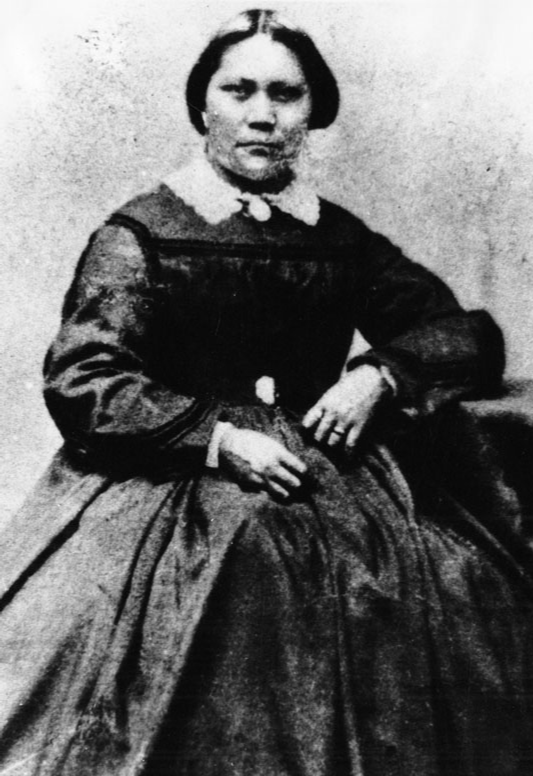
Kahpeputz was a slave in Brigham Young's household for over a decade.

The LDS Church's stance towards slavery alternated several times in its history, from one of neutrality, to anti-slavery, to pro-slavery. Smith had at times advocated both for and against slavery, eventually coming to take an anti-slavery stance later in his life. According to historian Andres Resendez, one of Smith's successors Brigham Young and other LDS leaders in Utah Territory leaders "did not so much want to do away with Indian slavery as to use it for their own ends." Young officially legalized Native American slavery in the Utah Territory in 1852 with each purchased Native American person allowed to be held up to twenty years in indentured servitude. Children between seven and sixteen years old were supposed to be sent to school three months of the year, but were otherwise put to work. Soon after Mormons colonized the Salt Lake Valley in 1847 child slaves became a vital source of their labor, and were exchanged as gifts. Within a decade of settling the Salt Lake Valley over 400 Native American children were purchased and lived in Mormon homes. In 1849 a posse of around 100 LDS men in southern Utah chased and killed twenty-five Native American men in retaliation for some cattle raids, and their women and children were taken as slaves.

Leader Brigham Young advocated buying children held by Native Americans and Mexican traders as slaves, and encouraged Latter-day Saints to educate and acculturate the children as if they were their own. However, despite the requirement to educate the Native American indentured servants, the majority had received no formal education according to an 1860 census. Young's spouse owned a Native American slave Kahpeputz. At age seven she was kidnapped from her Bannock family and tortured, and later purchased by Brigham Young's brother-in-law and gifted to one of Young's wives and renamed Sally. She was a servant in the Young household for over a decade working long hours with the rest of the servants and was not taught to read or write.

While considering appropriations for Utah Territory, Representative Justin Smith Morrill criticized the LDS Church for its laws on Indian slavery. He said that the laws were unconcerned about the way the Indian slaves were captured, noting that the only requirement was that the Indian be possessed by a White person through purchase or otherwise. He said that Utah was the only American government to enslave Indians, and said that state-sanctioned slavery "is a dreg placed at the bottom of the cup by Utah alone". The Republicans' abhorrence of slavery in Utah delayed Utah's entrance as a state into the Union. In 1857, Representative Justin Smith Morrill estimated that there were 400 Indian slaves in Utah. Richard Kitchen has identified at least 400 Indian slaves taken into Mormon homes, but estimates even more went unrecorded because of the high mortality rate of Indian slaves. Many of them tried to escape. Slavery in Utah ended in 1862 when the United States Congress abolished it nationwide. In a 2020 general conference address church apostle Quentin Cook said of early church history, "Many [non-Mormon] Missourians considered Native Americans a relentless enemy and wanted them removed from the land. In addition, many of the Missouri settlers were slave owners and felt threatened by those who were opposed to slavery. In contrast, our doctrine respected the Native Americans, and our desire was to teach them the gospel of Jesus Christ. With respect to slavery, our scriptures had made it clear that no man should be in bondage to another."

== Violence ==
=== Battles ===
Violence between Mormon adherents and Native Americans include the Black Hawk War, Ute Wars, Wakara's (Walker's) War, and Posey War.

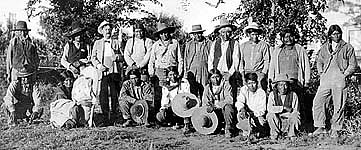
Ute and Paiute Native Americans involved in the 1923 Posey War in southeast Utah

=== Massacres of Native American people by LDS adherents ===
==== Timpanogos extermination order ====
During the 1850 escalation to the Battle at Fort Utah, Brigham Young ordered his Deseret Territorial Militia to "go and kill" the Timpanogos people of Utah Valley, further stating, "We have no peace until the men [are] killed off—never treat the Indian as your equal". He clarified that the militia should "let the women and children live if they behave themselves." Following this order was the "bloodiest week of Indian killing in Utah history." By the end of the wintertime conflict over 100 Timpanogos Utes were killed by Young's forces, and 50 of their bodies were beheaded and their heads put on display for several weeks in Fort Utah as a warning to the 26 surviving Native American women and children prisoners from the conflict held there. The prisoners were then distributed to LDS families to be used as slaves.

==== Table of massacres ====
Year (Date)	Name	Current location (state)	Description	Reported deaths
1849 (Mar 5)	Battle Creek massacre	Utah	In response to some cattle being stolen, Governor Brigham Young sent members of the Mormon militia to "put a final end to their depredations". They were led to a band, where they attacked them, killing the men and taking the women and children as captives.	4 (more by some accounts)
1850 (Feb 8)	Provo River Massacre	Utah	Governor Brigham Young issued a partial extermination order of the Timpanogos who lived in Utah Valley. In the north, the Timpanogos were fortified. However, in the south, the Mormon militia told them they were friendly before lining them up to execute them. Dozens of women and children were enslaved and taken to Salt Lake City, Utah, where many died.	102 (& "many" taken captive)
1851 (Apr 23)	Skull Valley massacre	Utah	In retaliation for the theft of horses near Tooele, Utah, Porter Rockwell and company took 30 uninvolved Utes camped nearby on Rush Lake as prisoners, and–after most escaped—executed the five remaining captives in nearby Skull Valley.	5
1853 (Oct 2)	Nephi massacre	Utah	Eight uninvolved Goshute men were shot in retaliation for the previous day's murder of four LDS people by unknown Ute people.	8
1865 (Jul 18)	The Squaw Fight/The Grass Valley Massacre	Utah	While searching for Antonga Black Hawk, the Mormon militia came upon a band of Ute Indians. Thinking they were part of Black Hawk's band, they attacked them. They killed 10 men and took the women and children captive. After the women and children tried to escape, the militia shot them too.	10 men + unknown women and children
1866 (Apr 21)	Circleville Massacre	Utah	Mormon militiamen killed 16 Paiute men and women at Circleville, Utah. 6 men were shot, allegedly while trying to escape. The others (3 men and 7 women) had their throats cut. 4 small children were spared.	16

=== Massacres of LDS adherents by Native American people ===
Year (Date)	Name	Current location (state)	Description	Reported deaths
1853 (Oct 1)	Fountain Green Massacre	Utah	Four LDS travelers were killed by Ute people.	4
1858 (Jun 4)	Salt Creek Canyon massacre	Utah	Four Danish immigrants traveling by wagon to Sanpete County, Utah were killed by unknown Native Americans.	4

=== Mountain Meadows Massacre ===
In 1857 LDS militiamen dressed up as Native Americans and recruited a smaller party of Southern Paiutes for a five-day siege on a wagon train of White pioneers travelling from Arkansas to California through Utah. The disguises were an attempt to shift blame for the aggression from White Mormon people onto the local Native Americans, and for many years after, the mass murder which became known as the Mountain Meadows Massacre was blamed on Paiute Indians. During the militia's first assault on the wagon train, the emigrants fought back, and a five-day siege ensued. Eventually, fear spread among the militia's leaders that some emigrants had caught sight of the White men, likely discerning the actual identity of a majority of the attackers. As a result, militia commander William H. Dame ordered his forces to kill all the adults. 120 men and women, and all their children ages seven and older were slaughtered and their bodies left unburied. The massacre almost pushed the US government into the Utah War with the LDS Church.

=== Bear River Massacre ===
On January 29, 1863 a United States Army regiment killed an estimated 250 to 400 (Note: Estimates of the number of victims killed vary, with some stated figures including 250, 350, and 400.) children, women, and men at a Shoshone village near Preston, Idaho under the urging of Mormon residents of Cache Valley, Utah. The Mormon settlers accused some Shoshine men of killing some of their cattle. The people of this camp had not been involved in the cattle killing. According to LDS historian Brigham D. Madsen, "Tacitly, if not overtly, the Mormons were accomplices" to the massacre. Some sources describe it as the largest mass murder of Native Americans by the US military, and largest single episode of genocide in US history. The overall response from local Mormon settlers was gratitude for eliminating the local Shoshone people, while a number expressed remorse for their suffering. Refugees from this massacre moved into Box Elder County where they converted to Mormonism and eventually settled on church-owned property at Washakie, Utah.

== Indian Placement Program ==
The Indian Placement Program (also called the Indian Student Placement Program and the Lamanite Placement Program) was operated by the LDS Church in the United States, officially operating from 1954 and virtually closed by 1996. It had its peak during the 1960s and 1970s. Native American students who were baptized members of the LDS Church were placed in foster homes of LDS members during the school year. They attended majority-White public schools, rather than the Indian boarding schools or local schools on the reservations. This was in line with the Indian Relocation Act of 1956. An LDS author wrote in 1979 that in southeast Idaho Native Americans from reservations were often treated with disdain by LDS and non-LDS White people.

The program was developed according to LDS theology, whereby conversion and assimilation to Mormonism could help Native Americans. An estimated 50,000 Native American children went through the program. The foster placement was intended to help develop leadership among Native Americans and assimilate them into majority-American culture. The cost of care was borne by the foster parents, and financially stable families were selected by the church. Most of these placements took place on the Navajo Nation, with a peak participation of 5,000 students in 1972. The program decreased in size after the 1970s, due to criticism, changing mores among Native Americans, and restriction of the program to high school students as schools improved on reservations. In the 70s and 80s more Native Americans attended the church's Brigham Young University than any other major US institution of higher learning. Many of the students and families praised the program; others criticized it and the LDS Church for assimilationist policies weakening the Native Americans' ties to their own cultures.

In the spring of 2015, four plaintiffs (now referred to as the "Doe Defendants") filed suit in the Window Rock District of the Navajo Nation Tribal Court, alleging they had been sexually abused for years while in the foster program, roughly from the years 1965 to 1983, and the LDS Church did not adequately protect them. The LDS Church filed suit in federal district court in Salt Lake City, alleging that the Tribal Court did not have jurisdiction and seeking an injunction "to stay the proceedings from moving forward under tribal jurisdiction." Federal district court judge Robert Shelby denied the church's motion to dismiss and also ruled that it first had to "exhaust all remedies" in Tribal Court.

== Teachings on Native American skin color ==
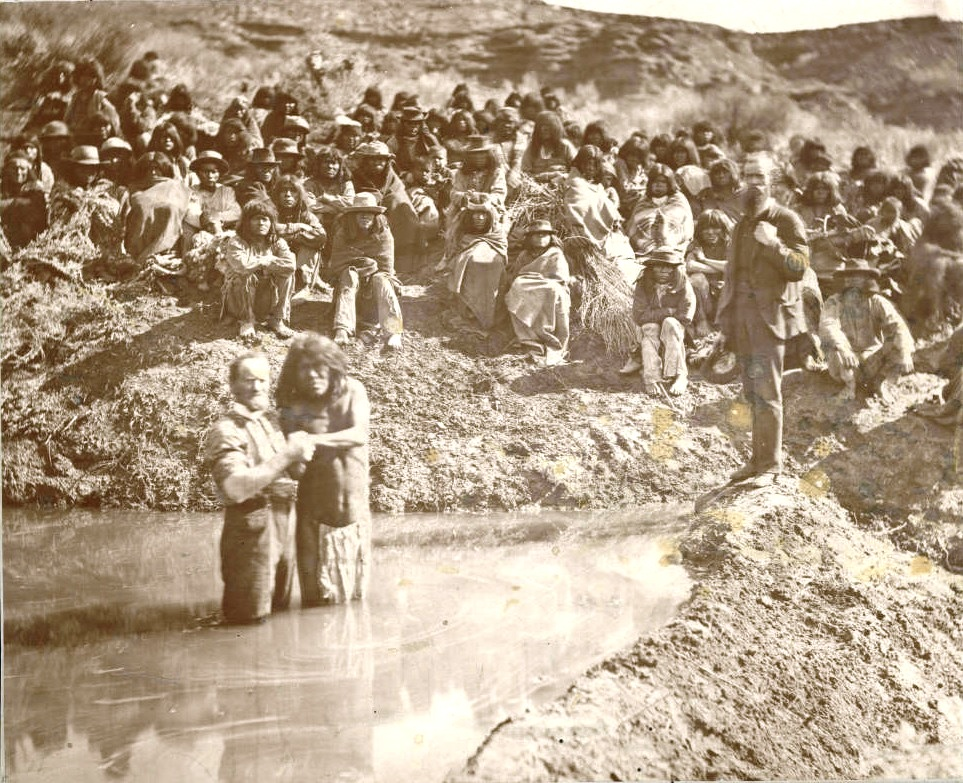
Shivwits Band of Paiute people being baptized into the LDS Church by White missionaries in 1875

Several church leaders have stated that the Book of Mormon teaches that Native Americans have dark skin (or the "curse of redness") because their ancestors (the Lamanites) were cursed by God, but if Native Americans follow church teachings, their dark skin will be removed. Not far into the narrative of Book of Mormon God marks Lamanites (the presumed ancestors of Native Americans) with dark skin because of their iniquity, an act similar to the Bible's Curse of Cain which later some Protestants interpreted as the beginning of the Black race. The Book of Mormon passage states, "[God] had caused the cursing to come upon [the Lamanites] ... because of their iniquity ... wherefore, as they were White, and exceeding fair and delightsome, that they might not be enticing unto my people [the Nephites] the Lord God did cause a skin of blackness to come upon them." During the century between 1835 and 1947 the official LDS hymnbook had lyrics discussing a lightening of Native American skin color stating, "Great spirit listen to the Red Man's wail! ... Not many moons shall pass away before/ the curse of darkness from your skins shall flee". They taught that in the afterlife's highest degree of heaven Native American's skin would become "white in eternity" like everyone else. They often equated Whiteness with righteousness, and taught that originally God made his children White in his own image. A 1959 report by the U.S. Commission on Civil Rights found that most Utah Mormons believed "by righteous living, the dark-skinned races may again become 'white and delightsome'." Conversely, the church also taught that White apostates would have their skins darkened when they abandoned the faith.

In 1953, President of the Quorum of the Twelve Apostles Joseph Fielding Smith stated, "After the people again forgot the Lord ... the dark skin returned. When the Lamanites fully repent and sincerely receive the gospel, the Lord has promised to remove the dark skin.... Perhaps there are some Lamanites today who are losing the dark pigment. Many of the members of the Church among the Catawba Indians of the South could readily pass as of the White race; also in other parts of the South." Additionally, in a 1960 LDS Church General Conference, apostle Spencer Kimball suggested that the skin of Latter-day Saint Native American was gradually turning lighter. Mormons believed that through intermarriage, the skin color of Native Americans could be restored to a "white and delightsome" state. Navajo general authority George Lee stated that he had seen some Native American members of the church upset over these teachings and that they did not want their skin color changed as they liked being brown, and so he generally avoided discussing the topic. Lee interpreted the teachings to mean everyone's skin would be changed to a dazzling white in the celestial kingdom. Kimball, however, suggested that the skin lightening was a result of the care, feeding, and education given to Native American children in the home placement program.

In 1981, church leaders changed a scriptural verse about Lamanites in the Book of Mormon from stating "they shall be a white and delightsome people" to stating "a pure and delightsome people". Thirty-five years later in 2016, the LDS Church made changes to its online version of the Book of Mormon in which phrases on the Lamanite's "skin of blackness" and them being a "dark, loathsome, and filthy" people were altered. In 2013, teachings on skin color being associated with a curse were officially renounced for the first time.

In 2020 controversy over the topic was ignited again when the LDS Church's recently printed manuals stated that the dark skin was a sign of the curse and the Lord placed the dark skin upon the Lamanites to keep the Nephites from having children with them. In recent decades, the LDS Church has condemned racism and increased its proselytization efforts and outreach in Native American communities, but it still faces accusations of perpetuating implicit racism by not acknowledging or apologizing for its prior discriminatory practices and beliefs. A 2023 survey of over 1,000 former church members in the Mormon corridor found race issues in the church to be one of the top three reported reasons why they had disaffiliated.

== Marriages between Native Americans and White Latter Day Saints ==
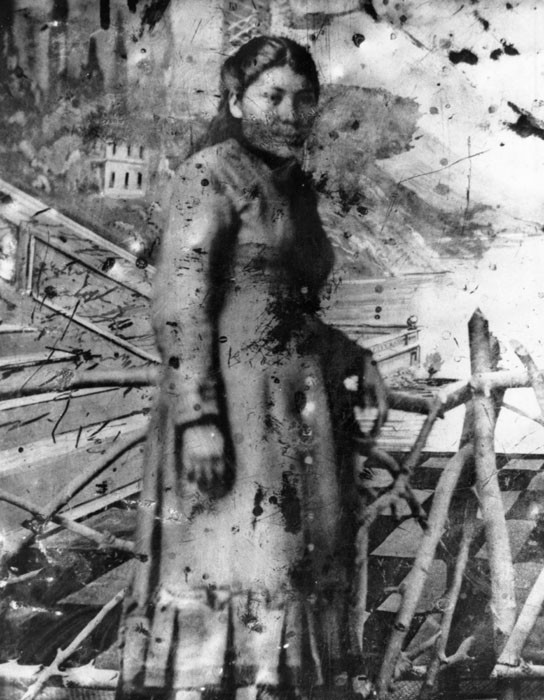
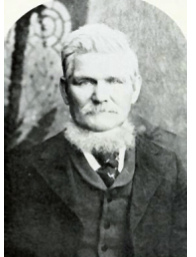
Native American Jeanette Smith married LDS, European American Dudley Leavitt in 1860.

In the past, LDS Church leaders have consistently opposed marriages between members of different ethnicities, but today, interracial marriage is no longer considered a sin. Early Mormon leaders made an exception to the interracial marriage teachings by allowing White LDS men to marry Native American women because Native Americans were viewed as being descended from the Israelites; however, under Young, leaders did not sanction White LDS women marrying Native American men. In 1890 Native Americans made up only 1.6% of Utah's population. In the 1930s many states had laws banning Native Americans from marrying White people, though, Utah did not.

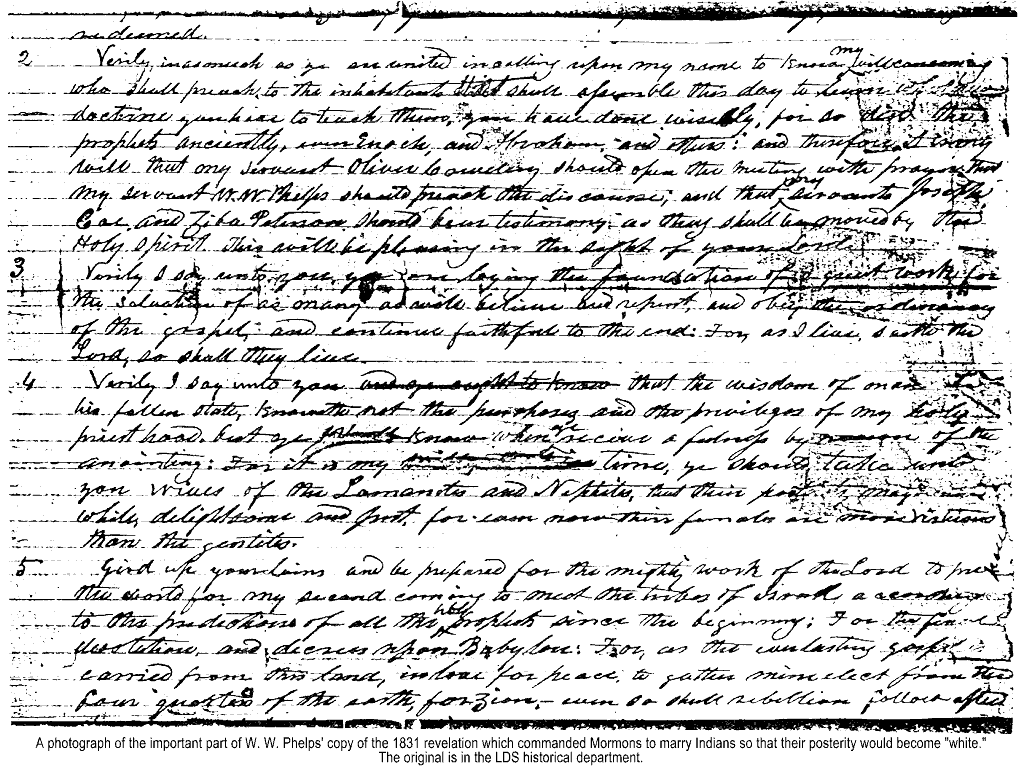
Copy of W.W. Phelp's letter to Brigham Young reporting Joseph Smith approved marriages between church members and Native Americans, stating "For it is my will, that in time, ye should take unto you wives of the Lamanites and Nephites, that their posterity may become white, delightsome and Just, for even now their females are more virtuous than the gentiles."

In 1861, in a letter to Brigham Young, W.W. Phelps stated that Smith received a revelation in which God wanted several missionaries then present to eventually marry Native American women in a polygamous relationship so that their posterity may become "white, delightsome, and just". Though Smith's successor Young believed that Native American peoples were "degraded", and "fallen in every respect, in habits, custom, flesh, spirit, blood, desire", he also allowed Mormon men to marry Native American women as part of a process that would make their people White and delightsome and restore them to their "pristine beauty" within a few generations.

Many church leaders had different views on these unions, however, and they were rare, and those in these marriages were looked down upon by many LDS community members. Native American men were prohibited from marrying White women in Mormon communities. Though, he would later oppose the marriage of Native American men to White LDS women, Young performed the first recorded sealing ceremony between any "Lamanite" and White member in October 1845 when an Oneida man Lewis Dana and Mary Gont were sealed in the Nauvoo Temple. Though few in number, another notable example of a Native American man marrying an LDS woman at the time was the 1890 marriage of Ute violinist David Lemmon and Josephine Neilson in the St. George Utah Temple. More common, however, was the experience of Tony Tillohash in the early 1900s who was rejected by the parents of a White LDS woman he proposed to, and was told to marry among his people.

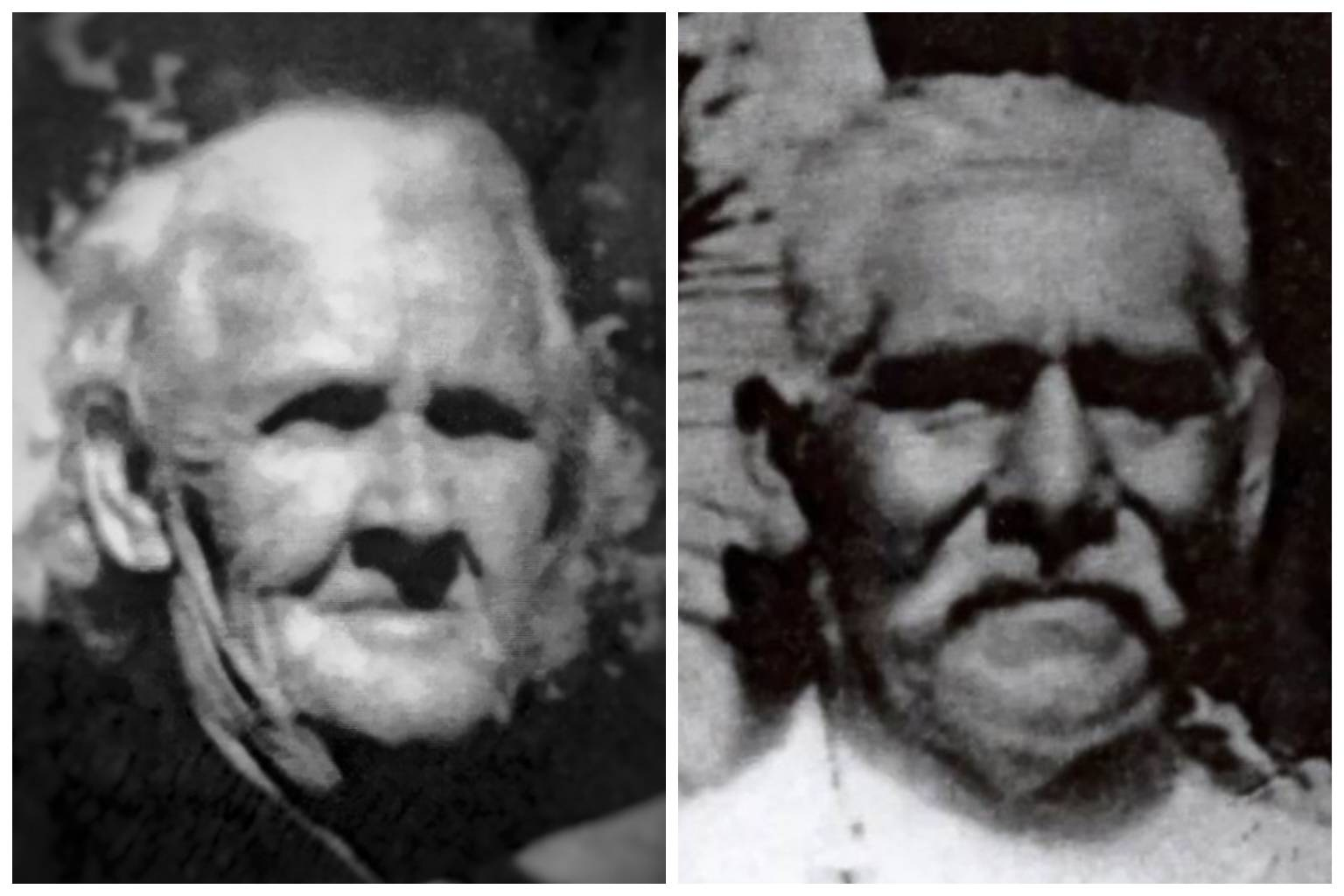
LDS couple Caroline Josephine Neilson and David Lemmon in Utah, circa mid-1920s

There is evidence that Young may have married his Bannock servant Kahpeputz (Sally) Young. Kahpeputz would later marry Ute chief Kanosh) in a temple, and they were both buried in their LDS temple robes, a custom for LDS members.

By 1870 only about 30 Mormon men had Native American wives, and few further interracial marriages with Native Americans occurred. Later Mormons believed that Native American skins would be lightened through some other method. Under the presidency of Spencer W. Kimball, the church discouraged interracial marriages with Native Americans. In 2013, the LDS Church disavowed previous teachings which stated that interracial marriage is a sin.

== Other Latter Day Saint groups' teachings ==
In 1920, what was then the Reorganized Church of Jesus Christ of Latter Day Saints (now called the Community of Christ), published a pamphlet titled Whence Came the Red Man which summarized the Book of Mormon stating, "two great camps ... began to quarrel bitterly among themselves. Part of them became the color of fine copper and the red brethren fought against the white."

== See also ==
- Black people and Mormonism
- Criticism of the Church of Jesus Christ of Latter-day Saints
- Curses of Cain and Ham and the LDS Church
- Mormonism and Pacific Islanders
- Criticism of the Book of Mormon
- Phrenology and the Latter Day Saint Movement
