= Salt Creek =

Salt Creek may refer to:

== Streams ==
- Salt Creek (Amargosa River tributary), California
- Salt Creek (Orange County), California
- Salt Creek (Sacramento River tributary), California
- Salt Creek (Salton Sea), California
- Salt Creek (Pueblo County, Colorado), a stream located entirely within Pueblo County, Colorado
- Salt Creek (Des Plaines River tributary), Illinois
- Salt Creek (Little Wabash River tributary), Illinois
- Salt Creek (Sangamon River tributary), Illinois
- Salt Creek (Little Calumet River tributary), Indiana
- Salt Creek (White River tributary), Indiana
- Salt Creek (Osage River), Missouri
- Salt Creek (Platte River), Nebraska
- Salt Creek (Muskingum County, Ohio), a stream located entirely within Muskingum County, Ohio
- Salt Creek (Middle Fork Willamette River tributary), Oregon
- Salt Creek (Juab County), Utah
- Salt Creek (Washington)

== Settlements ==
- Salt Creek, Colorado
- Salt Creek, Oregon
- Salt Creek, South Australia
- Salt Creek, Panama, a village on Bastimentos Island, Panama

== Other ==
- Salt Creek (2015), a novel by Australian author Lucy Treloar
- Salt Creek Bay, on which Edithburgh is located, in South Australia
- Salt Creek Canyon massacre, June 4, 1858 massacre in Salt Creek Canyon, Utah
- Salt Creek Oil Field, located in Natrona County, Wyoming.
- Salt Creek pupfish, another name for the Death Valley pupfish
- Salt Creek Township (disambiguation)
- Salt Creek (Victoria), a historic homestead in Woorndoo, Victoria, Australia

== See also ==
- Salt River (disambiguation)
