= Nephi massacre =

1853 lynching of Native Americans by Mormons

Nephi Massacre
- Part of Wakara's War
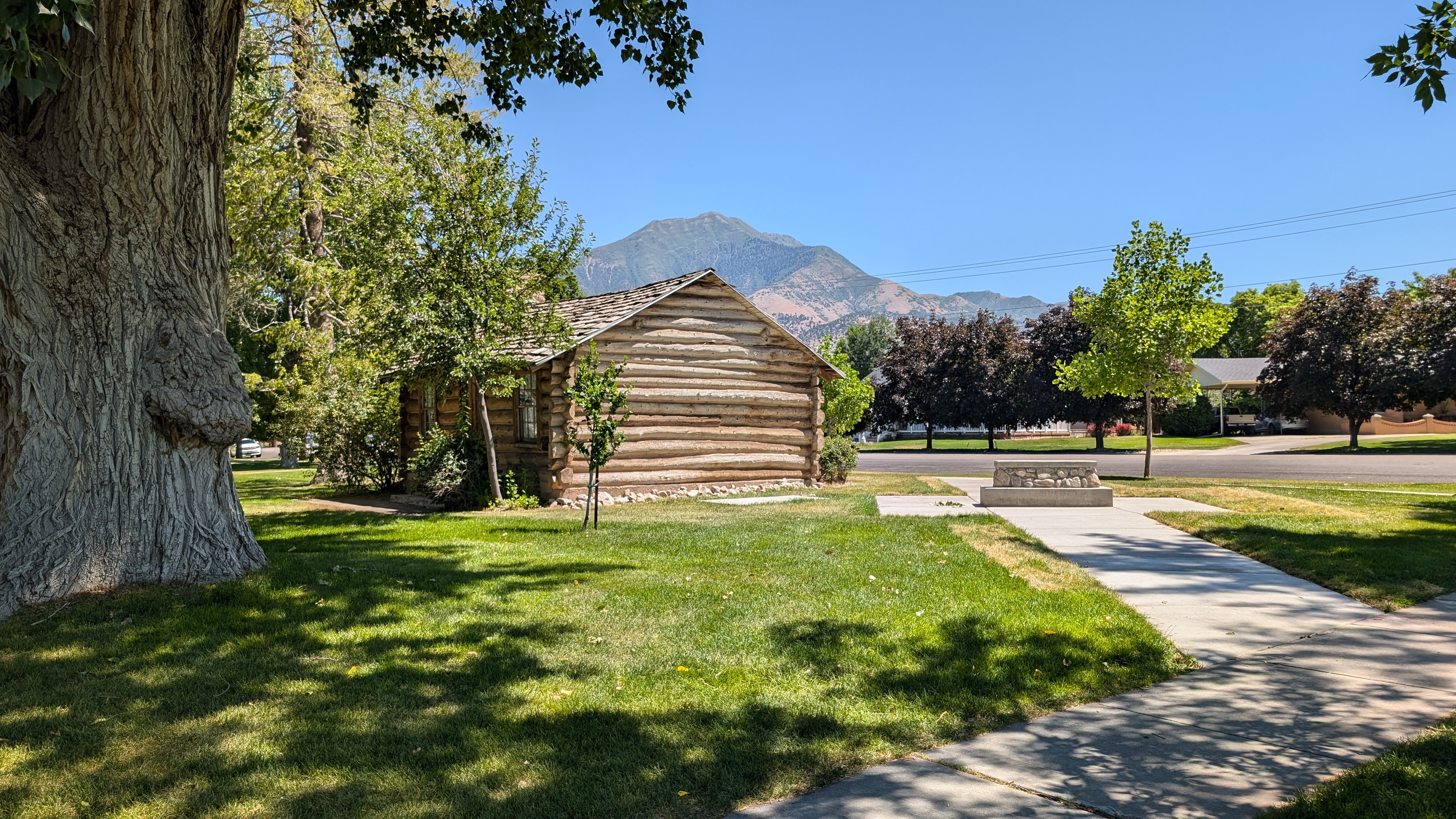
- Cabin near the site of the Salt Creek Fort, where the massacre took place.
- Location: 39°42′31″N 111°50′10″W; Nephi, Utah
- Date: 2 Oct 1853
- Target: Group of Goshute Western Shoshone people
- Attack type: Mass execution
- Weapons: Guns, blunt weapons
- Deaths: 7 males, ages 10–35
- Perpetrator: Members of the LDS Church
- Motive: Paranoia towards Native American people during Wakara's War

The Nephi massacre was an 1853 incident when a group of Mormons invited a group of peace-seeking Goshute Native American men, children, and one woman into their fort in Nephi, Utah and executed the seven men and took the remaining three as prisoners. The settlers were acting in retaliation for the recent deaths of four Mormons in the Fountain Green massacre done by a different nation of Native American called Ute. The settlers were from the Church of Jesus Christ of Latter-day Saints (LDS Church) commonly called Mormons.

The murder of the Goshute men occurred in the midst of a series of skirmishes dubbed Wakara's War between Native Americans and Mormons in the present-day Utah region. LDS settlers at Salt Creek Fort in present-day Nephi, Utah invited the group of people inside the fort, took them prisoner, shot them in the back of the head, and buried them in a mass grave. One woman and two children from the group were taken prisoner.

== Accounts from local personal journals ==
Adelia Almira Wilcox, whose husband had been killed by Native Americans two weeks before, wrote in her memoir that those killed in the Nephi massacre were, "shot down without even considering whether they were the guilty ones or not .... They were shot down like so many dogs, picked up with pitchforks [put] on a sleigh and hauled away."

According to another local woman:

This barbarous circumstance [of the Fountain Green massacre] actuated our brethren, counseled by ... President Call of Filmore [sic], to do quite as barbarous an act the following morning, being the Sabbath. Nine Indians coming into our Camp looking for protection and bread with us, because we promised it to them and without knowing [whether] they did the first evil act in that affair or any other, were shot down without one minute's notice. I felt satisfied in my own mind that if Mr. Heywood had been here they would not have been dealt with so unhumanly [sic]. It cast considerable gloom over my mind.

— Martha Spence Heywood, Journal

== Background ==
During the summer of 1853 violence erupted between Native Americans in what is now Utah Valley in Mormonism's largest denomination, the LDS Church. The series of killings were initiated over land and resource disputes. These conflicts are referred to as Wakara's War (also called Walker's War).

== Mass grave discovery ==
In 2006 the remains of the slain Utes were discovered in an area of Nephi called Old Hallow during a construction excavation.

== See also ==
- Battle at Fort Utah – 1850 killing of over 40 Native Americans by Mormon settlers
- Battle Creek massacre – 1849 massacre of Timpanogo Indians in Utah
- Circleville Massacre – 1866 lynching of Native Americans by Mormons
