= Salt River =

Salt River may refer to:

== Rivers ==
=== Caribbean ===
- Salt River (Guadeloupe) (French: Rivière Salée), a narrow sea channel separating Grande-Terre and Basse-Terre Island
- Salt River (Jamaica)

=== South Africa ===
- Salt River (Garden Route)
- Salt River (Western Cape)

=== United States ===
- Salt River (Arizona), the largest tributary of the Gila River
  - Salado culture
  - Salt River Pima–Maricopa Indian Community
- Salt River (California), an altered tributary of the lower Eel River, being restored
- Salt River (Kentucky)
- Salt River (Michigan), two rivers, one in Macomb County and one in Midland/Isabella counties
- Salt River (Missouri), a tributary of the Mississippi River in eastern Missouri, United States
- Salt River (United States Virgin Islands)
- Salt River (Wyoming)

=== Elsewhere ===
- Salt River (Canada), flows into the Slave River, near Fort Smith, Northwest Territories in Canada
- Salt River (Western Australia)

== Populated places ==
=== United States ===
- Salt River, Kentucky, an unincorporated community
- Salt River, Missouri, an unincorporated community
- Salt River Township, Adair County, Missouri
- Salt River Township, Audrain County, Missouri

=== Elsewhere ===
- Salt River, Cape Town, a suburb in Cape Town, South Africa

== Other uses ==
- Salt River (politics), a colloquial political slogan or catchphrase
- Salt River railway station, in Salt River, Cape Town, South Africa
- Salt River Bay National Historical Park and Ecological Preserve, on St. Croix, United States Virgin Islands
- Salt River Range, a mountain range in western Wyoming, United States

== See also ==
- Salt Fork Arkansas River
- Salt Fork of the Red River
- Salt Creek (disambiguation)
- Salt Lake (disambiguation)
- Rivière Salée (disambiguation)
