= Salée =

Salée is a surname. Notable people with the surname include:

- Catherine Salée, Belgian actress
- Henrik Salée (born 1955), Danish cyclist

== See also ==
- Rivière Salée (disambiguation)
