= Hurricane Waldo =

Category 2 Pacific hurricane in 1985

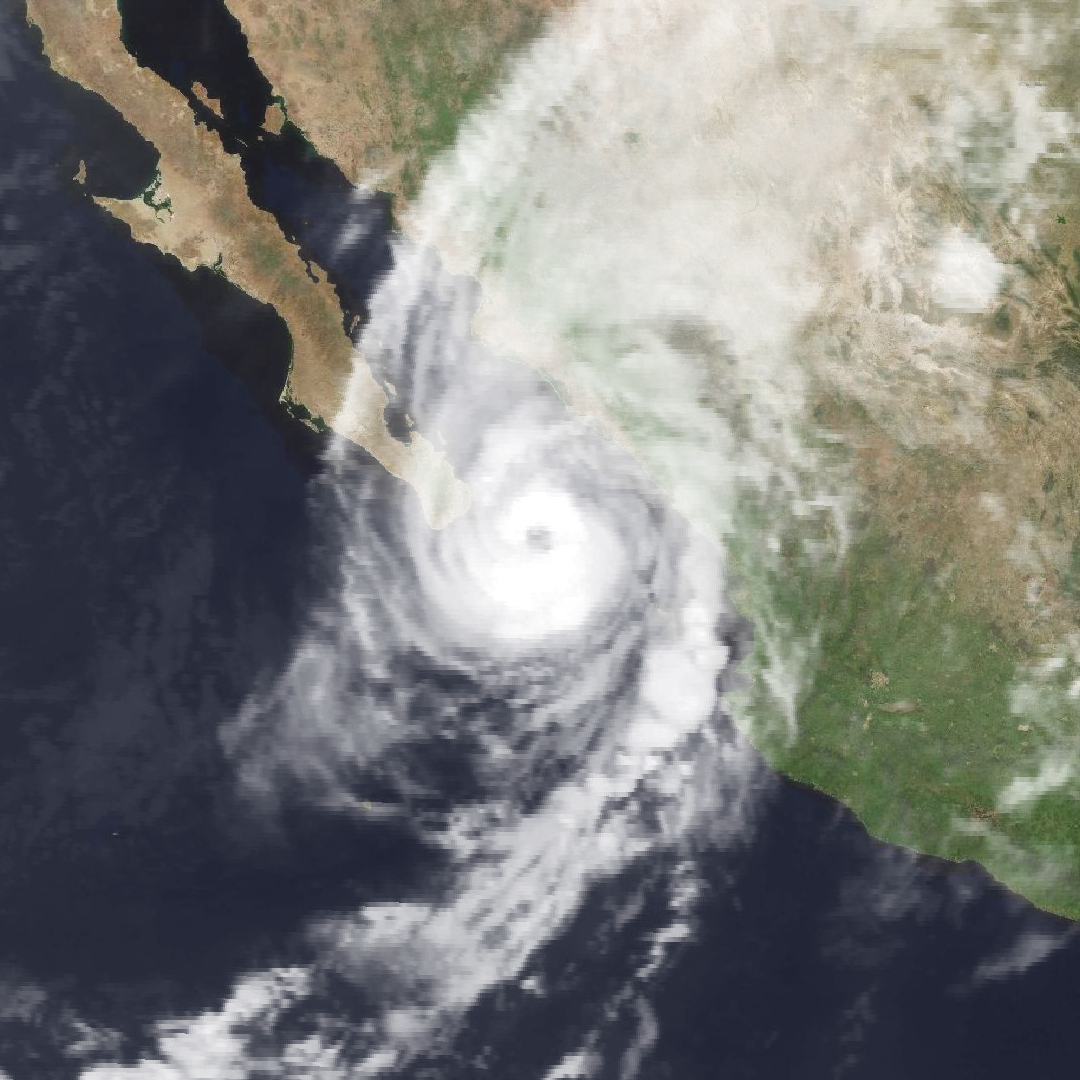
- Hurricane Waldo at peak intensity just southeast of the tip of the Baja Peninsula on October 9

Meteorological history
- Formed: October 7, 1985
- Dissipated: October 9, 1985

Category 2 hurricane
- 1-minute sustained (SSHWS/NWS)
- Highest winds: 105 mph (165 km/h)
- Lowest pressure: 982 mbar (hPa); 29.00 inHg

Overall effects
- Fatalities: 1 indirect
- Areas affected: Sinaloa, New Mexico, Texas, Kansas
- IBTrACS
- Part of the 1985 Pacific hurricane season

Hurricane Waldo was a Pacific hurricane whose remnants caused significant flooding in Kansas during October 1985. It was also the only hurricane to make landfall during the extremely active 1985 Pacific hurricane season. The twenty-fourth tropical cyclone, twenty-second named storm, and eleventh hurricane of the season, Waldo originated from a disturbance first detected by ship report on October 5, 1985. After developing into a tropical depression on October 7, it steadily intensified, becoming a tropical storm that day. Waldo reached hurricane intensity on October 8. After peaking as a moderate Category 2 hurricane on the Saffir–Simpson hurricane scale, it re-curved to the east, making landfall at peak intensity near Culiacán. Afterward, it rapidly dissipated. In all, Waldo caused moderate damage in Sonora. The remnants of the storm combined with a cold front over the Great Plains. Significant flooding and one death was recorded in Kansas. Many rivers and creeks overflowed its banks.

== Meteorological history ==
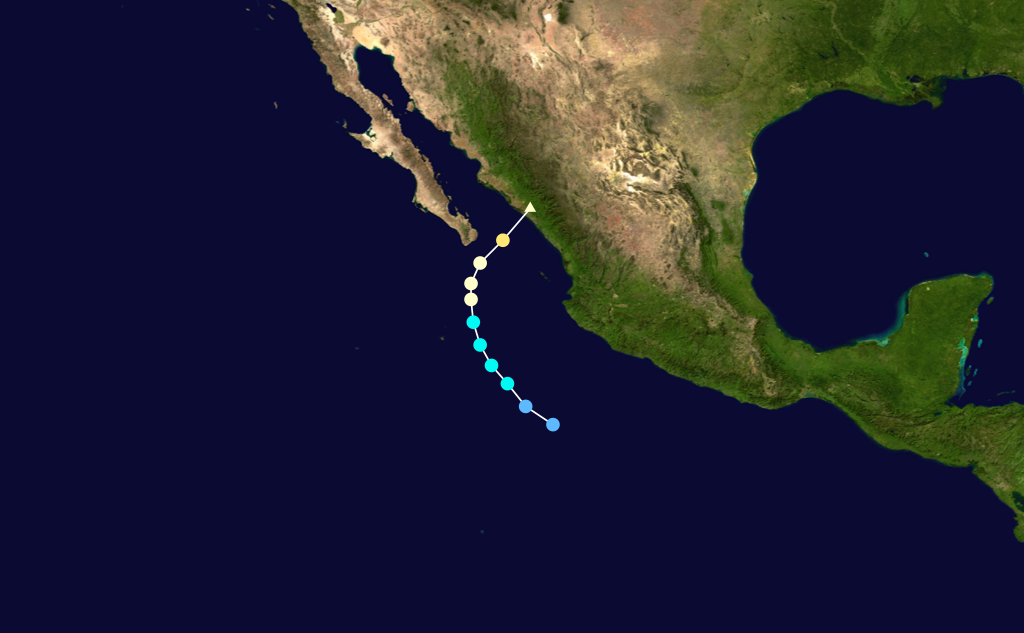
Map plotting the storm's track and intensity, according to the Saffir–Simpson scale Map key Saffir–Simpson scale Tropical depression (≤38 mph, ≤62 km/h) Tropical storm (39–73 mph, 63–118 km/h) Category 1 (74–95 mph, 119–153 km/h) Category 2 (96–110 mph, 154–177 km/h) Category 3 (111–129 mph, 178–208 km/h) Category 4 (130–156 mph, 209–251 km/h) Category 5 (≥157 mph, ≥252 km/h) Unknown Storm type Tropical cyclone Subtropical cyclone Extratropical cyclone, remnant low, tropical disturbance, or monsoon depression

Waldo originated from a developing disturbance first noted by Eastern Pacific Hurricane Center (EPHC) on October 5 based on data from ship reports. By 0000 UTC October 7, a circulation became evident on satellite imagery. Based on this, the EPHC upgraded the system into a tropical depression about 300 mi (480 km) west of the Mexican coast. Upon becoming a tropical cyclone, the depression began to turn to the northwest in response to a strong upper-level trough over Baja California Peninsula. Passing over 86 °F (30 °C) sea surface temperatures, the tropical cyclone intensified into Tropical Storm Waldo about 12 hours after developing. The storm began to intensify rapidly. Meanwhile, the tropical storm passed 92 mi (148 km) east of Socorro Island. Tropical Storm Waldo then began to turn to the north and while located 130 mi (210 km) south of Baja California Sur, Waldo was upgraded into a Category 1 hurricane on the Saffir–Simpson hurricane scale.

After reaching hurricane status the strengthening cyclone attained Category 2 hurricane status on October 9. Shortly thereafter, a ship reported a sea level pressure of 982 mb (29.0 inHg) just outside the center of circulation. Meanwhile, Hurricane Waldo reached its peak intensity of 105 mph (165 km/h). Four hours after Hurricane Waldo's peak, the storm made landfall near Culiacán. The storm rapidly dissipated during the afternoon of October 9, while the system was located inland over Mexico. The remnants of Waldo merged with a cold front and produced heavy rains across the Great Plains and Mississippi River Valley.

== Preparations and impact ==
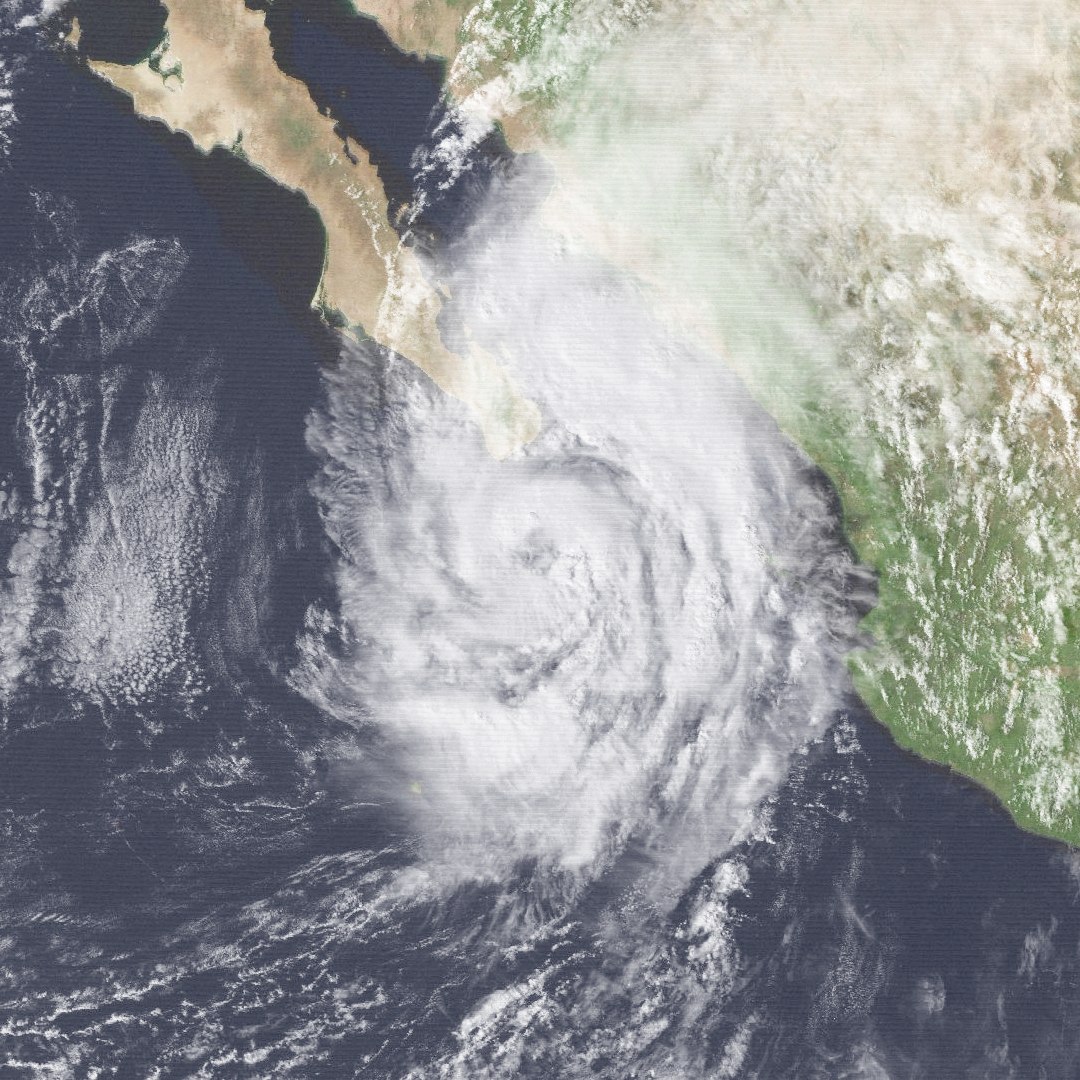
Hurricane Waldo intensifying as it approached the Baja Peninsula on October 8

In parts of Sinaloa, people were evacuated and then granted refuge in shelters. In Los Mochis, the Mexican Army was put on standby in the event the Fuerte River flooded. While no deaths or injuries were reported, much farmland and 600 houses were destroyed. The Juarez River bursts its banks, flooding at least eight neighborhoods in Culiacán. Telephone service in Los Mochis, Guarmuchil, and Guasave was cut when a communications tower was blown over. In Los Mochis, some schools and homes were destroyed and a few trees were uprooted. A total of 10,000 people were left homeless across the state. The peak rainfall total in Mexico from Waldo was 9.61 inches (244 mm) in Jocuixtita/San Ignacio; heavy rain was also recorded along southern Baja California Sur.

In the United States, heavy rainfall prompted flood watches for most of west Texas. The National Weather Service even noted the possibility of 12 in (300 mm) of rain in some areas across the state. Waldo contributed to rain heavy enough to cause some flash flooding in the Permian Basin area of Texas. Flood waters rose, leaving motorists stranded. One motorist was stranded for 30 minutes before begin rescued by another car. Odessa, Texas received about 2 in (51 mm) in a four and half-hour period. Torrential rainfall was recorded in Texas, but the highest official rainfall total in the United States was 6.6 in (170 mm), recorded in Hobbs, New Mexico. Flash floods affected the southern one–third of the state from rainfall associated from Waldo. Damage was estimated between $100,000–$1 million (1985 USD), mostly to crops, roads, and buildings.

With help from a cold front, Waldo contributed to major flooding in Kansas that forced many rivers and creeks to overflow their banks. A total of 4.5 in (110 mm) of rain fell in some locations. In the rural town of Raymond, a 52-year-old man died from a heart attack while moving to higher ground due to rising floodwaters. Approximately 15 people were evacuated from their homes in Easton due to the overflow of the nearby Stranger Creek. Some of the evacuated resident slept at the nearby senior center for the night where the American Red Cross delivered items such as blankets, food, and clothes to the victims of the flood. In Kansas City, Waldo produced 1 ft (30 cm) of water on roads, but none of the nearby homes received extensive damage. The Sedgwick County, the county fire department freed 35 trapped people from rising flood waters, six of which were rescued via helicopter. County workers were forced to use sandbags to prevent the dike along Cowskin creek from breaking. The Salt Creek overflowed its banks; subsequently, Highway 68 closed in Osage County. Within six days after the dissipation of Hurricane Waldo, the remnants had produced heavy rainfall as far north as Michigan with flooding recorded as far north as Iowa. Waldo's rain were comparable to Atlantic Hurricane Gloria though the wind speeds were much lower.

== See also ==
- List of Pacific hurricanes
- Other tropical cyclones named Waldo
