= Tintic War =

Part of the Ute Wars

- Part of Ute Wars
Date	February – March 1856
Location	Uintah County, Utah; Tooele County, Utah
Result	United States victory

Belligerents
Mormon settlers	US Government	Ute Tribe

The Tintic War was a short series of skirmishes occurring in February through March 1856 in Uintah County and Tooele County, Utah It occurred after the conclusion of the Walker War. It was named after a subchief of the Ute and involved several clashes between Mormon settlers and Native Americans previously residing in the Tintic and Cedar Valleys.

== Conflict ==
Initially, the settlers and Indians got along well. However, the war started out as small skirmishes between the two communities, with the first battle occurring at Battle Creek. The conflict began when Native Americans took settlers' cattle due to drought.

The local Indians' desperation occurred because they had been displaced from their land by the settlers. During the winter the Indians did not have the necessary resources to survive, and began to starve. The European Americans settled the area, and proceeded to establish mining communities. They depleted the land of timber, game, diverted the water, and most of the land's resources in general.

The settlers established successful livestock and agriculture endeavors on the land. The Indians were forced to steal from the settlers in order to survive. Brigham Young was among the settlers, and he recounts the early troubles by stating, "They came pretty nigh starving to death last winter; and they now see, if they are driven from these valleys in winter, they must perish".

== Outcome ==
The war concluded with the federal government intervening by taking the Utes from their land to the Uintah and Ouray Indian Reservation. This occurred in the late 1860s and in the Uinta Basin. However, the issues did not resolve quickly. The government never legally bought the Ute lands, causing issues that persisted after World War II, when the Indian Claims Commission demanded money for their confiscated lands.
