= List of storms named Waldo =

The name Waldo has been used for one tropical cyclone in the Eastern Pacific Ocean and for one in the Western Pacific Ocean.

In the Eastern Pacific:

- Hurricane Waldo (1985) – a Category 2 hurricane that made landfall in Sinaloa, Mexico.

In the Western Pacific:

- Tropical Storm Waldo (1998) (T9808, 13W) – struck Japan.
