= Circleville Massacre =

1866 lynching of Native Americans by Mormons

- Part of The Black Hawk War
- Location: 38°10′18″N 112°16′28″W; Circleville, Utah
- Date: April 21, 1866
- Target: Koosharem band of Southern Paiute people
- Attack type: Mass murder
- Weapons: Blunt weapons, knives, guns
- Deaths: 27 (children, women, and men)
- Perpetrator: Members of the LDS Church
- Motive: Paranoia towards Native American people during the Black Hawk War (1865–1872)

The Circleville Massacre was an 1866 lynching of 27 Southern Paiute Native American men, women, and children by early Mormon settlers in Circleville, Utah.

== Background ==
By 1866, Mormon and Native American confrontations were heated. Church officials ordered to have the Paiutes disarmed. Black Hawk and his band had killed many during the year before while defending their rights to their land. A determined camp of Koosharem Southern Paiutes remained in Circle Valley (Box Creek, now called Circleville), trying to be friendly with the settlers. However, the colonizers felt that they were in imminent danger, as some other Native groups were fighting back.

== Impetus ==
On April 21, 1866, an express from nearby Fort Sanford reached Circleville, Utah alleging a Paiute man had feigned friendly intent but then shot and killed a militiaman stationed there. The people of Circleville were told to protect themselves against the Native Americans who were camped in their valley. Upon receipt of this information, the people of Circleville called a town meeting. After much discussion, it was decided that they should arrest all the Paiutes that were camped nearby and bring them to Circleville for confinement.

== The massacre ==
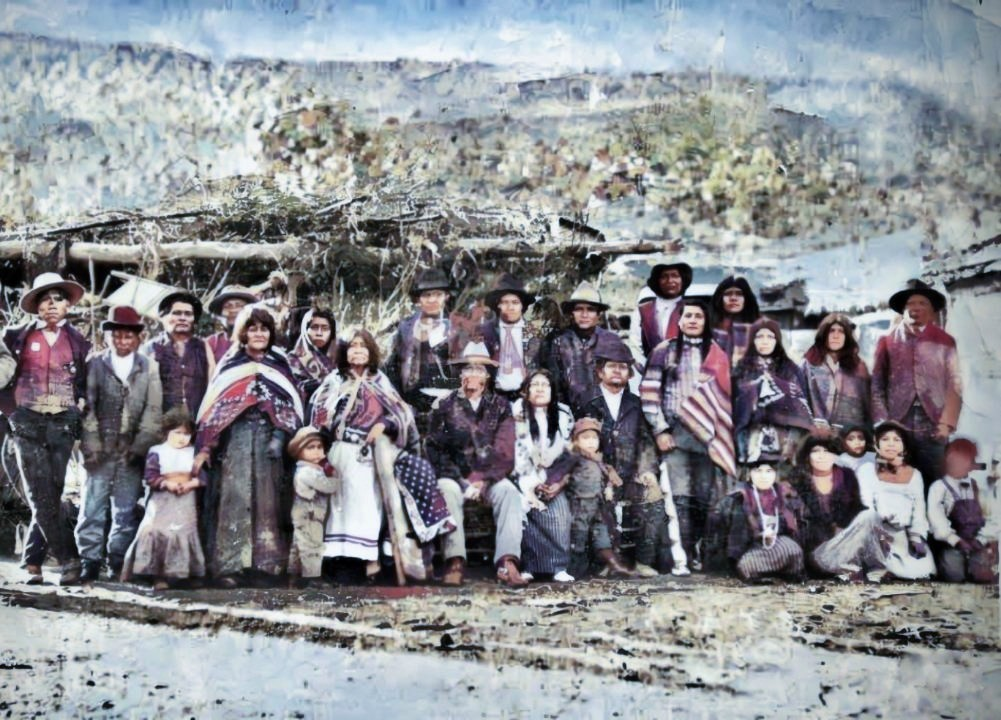
Koosharem Southern Paiute people in 1905. Jimmy Timmican kneeling on the far right in this 1905 photo in Koosharem, Utah gave a secondhand account of the massacre he'd heard from his father, which was carved on a stone monument to the victims in 2016.

Circleville Massacre Historical Marker

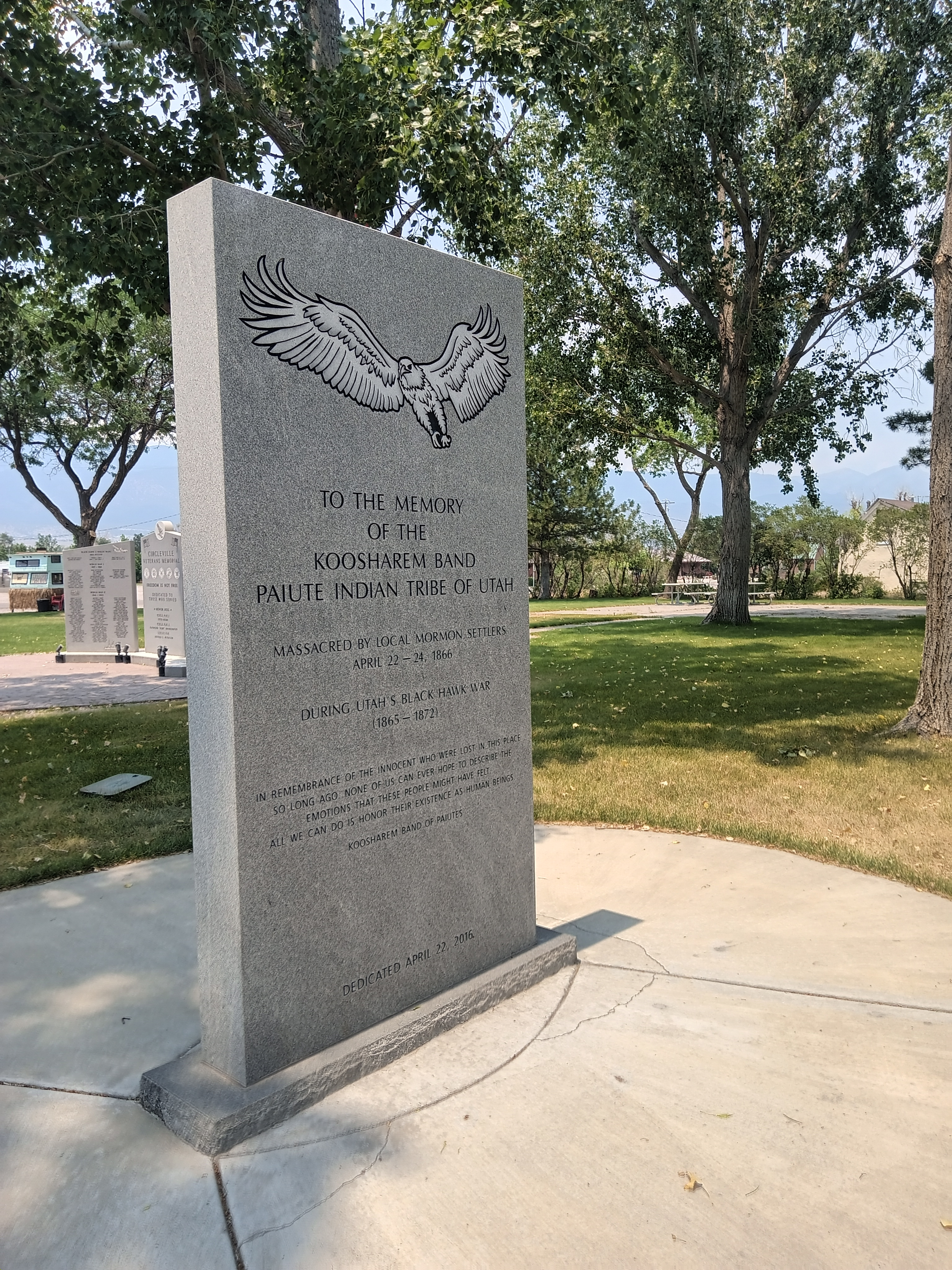
Front of the Circleville Monument

Every able-bodied man in the town set out that night to take custody of the Indigenous camp which they surrounded under cover of darkness. James T. S. Allred and Bishop William Jackson Allred went to the camp and persuaded the Southern Paiute people there to come to a meeting at Circleville. They told them that they had received a letter and they wanted to have it read to them. All of the Koosharem people agreed after pressuring to go to Circleville with the men, except one young man who refused and began to shoot at the posse. The posse returned fire, killing him. The rest of the camp was taken custody and led at gunpoint to Circleville where the letter was read to them. The Native Americans were told that they were to be retained as prisoners.

They were taken into custody, bound, and placed in the meeting house that night under guard, 26 in all. The next evening, two of the captives cut themselves loose from their bindings and attempted an escape, but they were shot by guards. The remaining prisoners were then moved to a more secure, underground cellar. In a subsequent town meeting, the settlers decided to kill the remaining prisoners. The 24 captive men, women, and children were led out of the cellar. They were struck on the back of the head to stun them then their throats slit, leaving them to bleed to death. Three children managed to escape their execution attempts, two young boys and a girl. The bodies of the executed Native families were secretly buried at night.

== Aftermath ==
The following day, the three escaped children were discovered hiding in a nearby cave and taken by James Allred to nearby Marysvale. Allred intended to sell or trade off the children as slaves. The little girl was killed by a violent bludgeoning. While the fate of one of the boys is unknown, the other boy Allred took to Spring City and sold him to Peter Monson for a horse and bushel of wheat.

Monson housed the boy in a tool shed. The boy befriended Monson's daughter who had been disfigured by burns on her face. Peter and Bertha Monson then adopted the boy and named him David Monson. In 2016, on the 150-year anniversary of the massacre a monument was dedicated in the town park to remember the Native Americans murdered nearby.

== See also ==
- Battle Creek massacre
- Fountain Green massacre
- Nephi massacre
- Provo River massacre
