= Salt River, Kentucky =

Unincorporated community in Kentucky, United States

- Unincorporated community
- Location within Kentucky Location within the United States
- Coordinates: 37°58′45″N 85°42′45″W
- Country: United States
- State: Kentucky
- County: Bullitt
- Elevation: 443 ft (135 m)
- Time zone: UTC-5 (Eastern (EST))
  - Summer (DST): UTC-4 (EST)
- GNIS feature ID: 502829

Salt River is an unincorporated community located in Bullitt County, Kentucky, United States.
