= Salt Creek Canyon massacre =

1858 killing of Danish immigrants in Utah, United States

Coordinates: 39°42′12.48″N 111°42′23.60″W

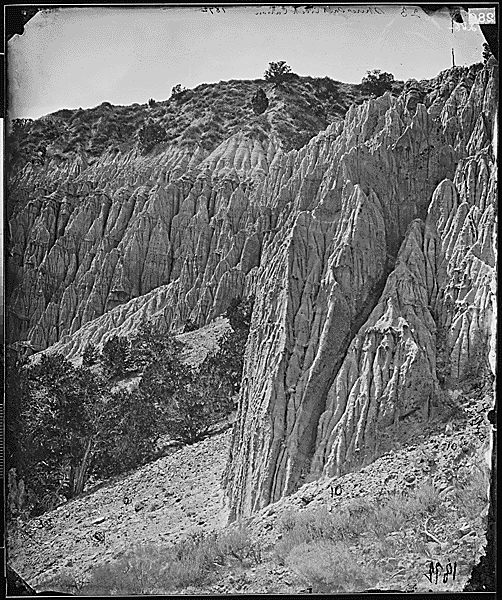
Salt Creek Canyon, photographed in 1872

The Salt Creek Canyon massacre occurred on June 4, 1858, when four Danish immigrants were ambushed and killed by unidentified Indians in Salt Creek Canyon, a winding canyon of Salt Creek east of present-day Nephi, in Juab County, Utah.

== Massacre ==
In early June 1858, Danish immigrants Jens Jorgensen, (Note: Due to Danish patronymics and possibly other factors converting Danish names to English, Jorgensen is also known as "Nils Otto Andersen".) his pregnant wife Hedevig Marie Jensen Jorgensen, Jens Terklesen, Christian I. Kjerluf, (Note: Listed as "Christian E. Kjerulf" on the Utah State Route 132 monument.) and John Ericksen were journeying unarmed to settle with other Scandinavian immigrants at the Mormon colony in the Sanpete Valley. The group was traveling with an ox team hitched to a wagon and another ox hitched to a handcart.

On the afternoon of June 4, they had come within a mile and a half of Salt Creek Canyon's opening into the Sanpete Valley when members of an unidentified Indian tribe emerged from hiding places and attacked them. Two of the Europeans were killed and burned with their wagon. Another was killed after running about 50 yards (46 m). The pregnant woman was killed near the wagon with a tomahawk, which received special note from historians. Ericksen, who had been walking some distance ahead of the others, escaped unharmed and made it to the nearby town of Ephraim around dark. The ox attached to the handcart, frightened by the attack, fled back to Nephi. The victims' bodies were brought to Ephraim for burial. The specific motive for the attack remains unclear.

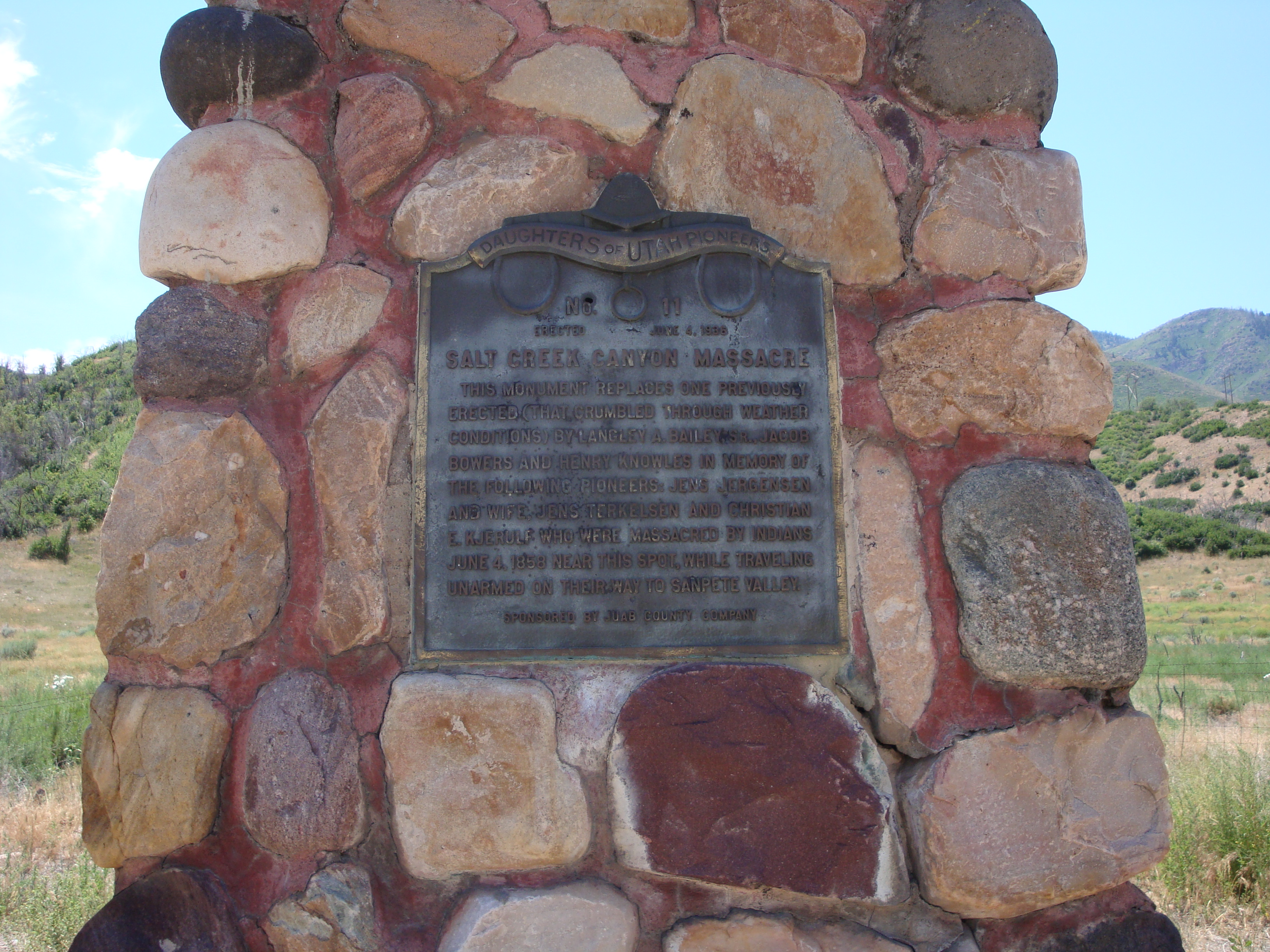
Monument of the Salt Creek Canyon massacre, in Salt Creek Canyon along SR-132

== Monument ==
A Daughters of Utah Pioneers monument (number 11), erected in 1936 on Utah State Route 132 between Nephi and Fountain Green, Utah, marks the site of the massacre.

== See also ==
- Fountain Green massacre
- Mountain Meadows Massacre
- Utah War
- Mormon pioneers
