= Salt Creek, Panama =

Salt Creek Quebrada Sal
- Town
- Location within Panama
- Coordinates: 9°17′N 82°6′W
- Country: Panama
- Province: Bocas del Toro
- District: Bocas del Toro
- Time zone: UTC-5 (ETZ)

Salt Creek (in Spanish: Quebrada Sal) is a Ngöbe Buglé village located on the southeastern end of Bastimentos island, in the Bocas del Toro Archipelago, Province and District of Panama.

The community consists of about 60 houses, an elementary school, handcrafts and general stores. The villagers depend mostly on their canoes for fishing and transportation although the village is slowly developing together with the whole archipelago.
