= Circleville, Utah =

Town in the state of Utah, United States

- Town
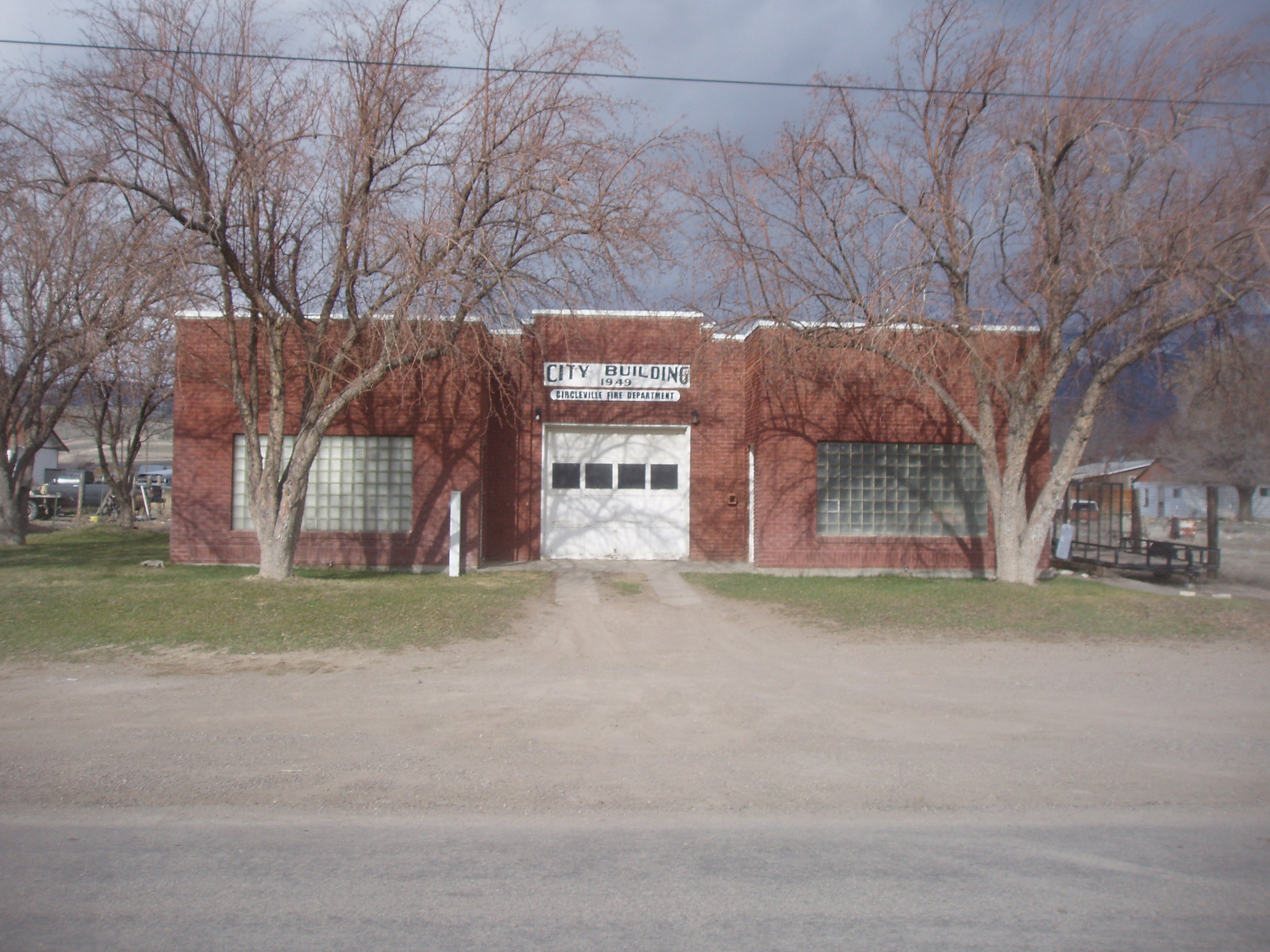
- Circleville fire station

- Location in Piute County and the state of Utah.
- Coordinates: 38°10′13″N 112°16′18″W
- Country: United States
- State: Utah
- County: Piute
- Founded: 1864
- Incorporated: August 24, 1921
- Founded by: William Allred

Area
  - Total: 11.04 sq mi (28.60 km^{2})
  - Land: 11.04 sq mi (28.60 km^{2})
  - Water: 0 sq mi (0.00 km^{2})
- Elevation: 6,066 ft (1,849 m)

Population (2020)
  - Total: 550
  - Density: 44/sq mi (17.1/km^{2})
- Time zone: UTC-7 (Mountain (MST))
  - Summer (DST): UTC-6 (MDT)
- ZIP code: 84723
- Area code: 435
- FIPS code: 49-12970
- GNIS feature ID: 1439749
- Website: www.circlevilleutah.org

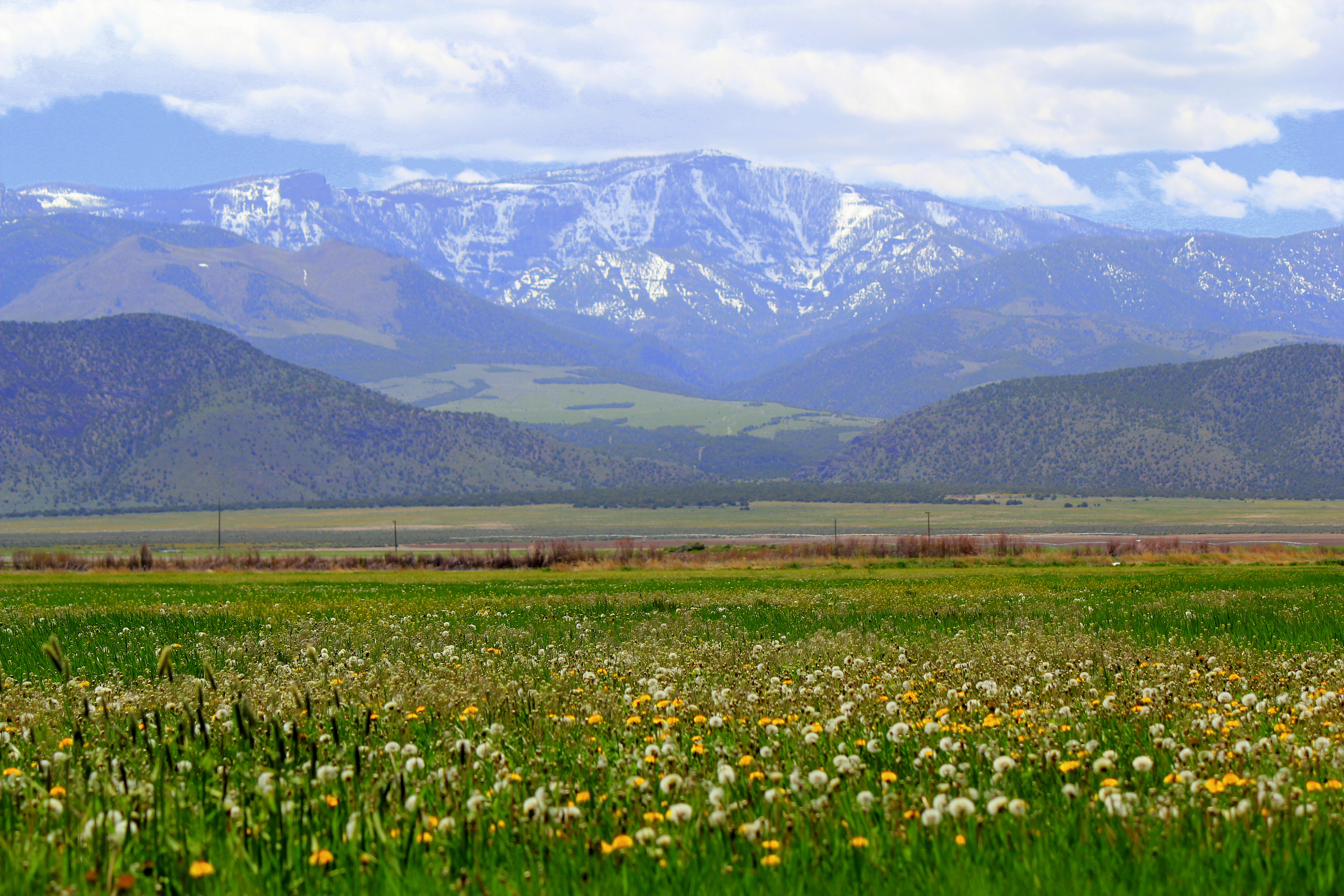
Springtime mountain view from Circleville

Circleville is a town in Piute County, Utah, United States. The population was 550 at the 2020 census.

== Geography ==
According to the United States Census Bureau, the town has a total area of 9.1 square miles (23.5 km^{2}), all land.

The American Discovery Trail runs through Circleville.

=== Climate ===
The Köppen Climate Classification subtype for this climate is "Dfb" (Warm Summer Continental Climate).

== History ==
In the area that became Circleville, the first European colonizers arrived in 1864. They were Mormon settlers from Mormonism's largest denomination the Church of Jesus Christ of Latter-day Saints (LDS Church). The town is located within Circle Valley which gets its name from its circular shape. The valley is completely encircled by mountains except where the Sevier River enters and exits the valley in the north and south.

In April 1866, the settlement was the site of the Circleville Massacre, a lynching of 27 Southern Paiute men, women, and children by LDS settlers during the Black Hawk War. In 2016, a monument was dedicated in the town park to remember the Native American people murdered during the massacre.

On June 28, 1866, the town was abandoned by the original settlers due to the war. A few settlers began to trickle back into the area in 1873 and the town was re-established in 1874 when Charles Wakeman Dalton crossed the mountain from Beaver with two of his wives and family.

Circleville became an incorporated community on August 24, 1921. Local residents were interested in facilitating the public services which municipal government provides, and they were particularly interested in building a culinary water system.

== Demographics ==
As of the census of 2000, there were 505 people, 172 households, and 132 families residing in the town. The population density was 55.7 people per square mile (21.5/km^{2}). There were 222 housing units at an average density of 24.5 per square mile (9.5/km^{2}).

Historical population
| Census | Pop. | Note | %± |
|---|---|---|---|
| 1880 | 416 | | — |
| 1890 | 458 | | 10.1% |
| 1900 | 538 | | 17.5% |
| 1910 | 523 | | −2.8% |
| 1920 | 586 | | 12.0% |
| 1930 | 435 | | −25.8% |
| 1940 | 683 | | 57.0% |
| 1950 | 603 | | −11.7% |
| 1960 | 478 | | −20.7% |
| 1970 | 443 | | −7.3% |
| 1980 | 445 | | 0.5% |
| 1990 | 417 | | −6.3% |
| 2000 | 505 | | 21.1% |
| 2010 | 547 | | 8.3% |
| 2020 | 550 | | 0.5% |
U.S. Decennial Census

There were 172 households, out of which 37.2% had children under the age of 18 living with them, 68.0% were married couples living together, 5.8% had a female householder with no husband present, and 22.7% were non-families. 22.1% of all households were made up of individuals, and 14.5% had someone living alone who was 65 years of age or older. The average household size was 2.94 and the average family size was 3.45.

In the town, the population was spread out, with 34.7% under the age of 18, 5.9% from 18 to 24, 18.4% from 25 to 44, 23.2% from 45 to 64, and 17.8% who were 65 years of age or older. The median age was 37 years. For every 100 females, there were 98.8 males. For every 100 females age 18 and over, there were 98.8 males. The racial makeup of the town was 97.23% White, 0.20% African American, 0.40% Native American, 0.20% Asian, 0.20% Pacific Islander, 0.99% from other races, and 0.79% from two or more races. Hispanic or Latino of any race were 4.36% of the population.

The median income for a household in the town was $32,083, and the median income for a family was $36,875. Males had a median income of $25,536 versus $19,063 for females. The per capita income for the town was $12,919. About 8.7% of families and 12.8% of the population were below the poverty line, including 15.2% of those under age 18 and 12.5% of those age 65 or over.

== Notable people ==
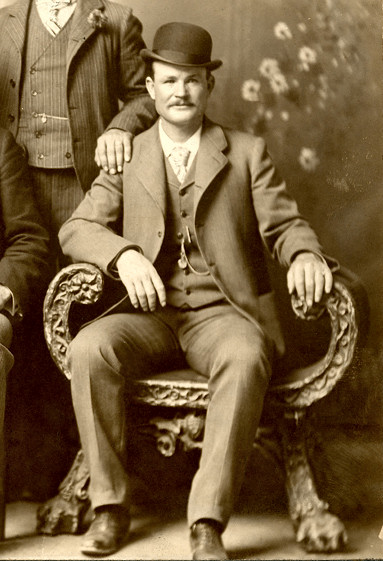
The outlaw Butch Cassidy grew up on the outskirts of Circleville. Photo circa 1900.

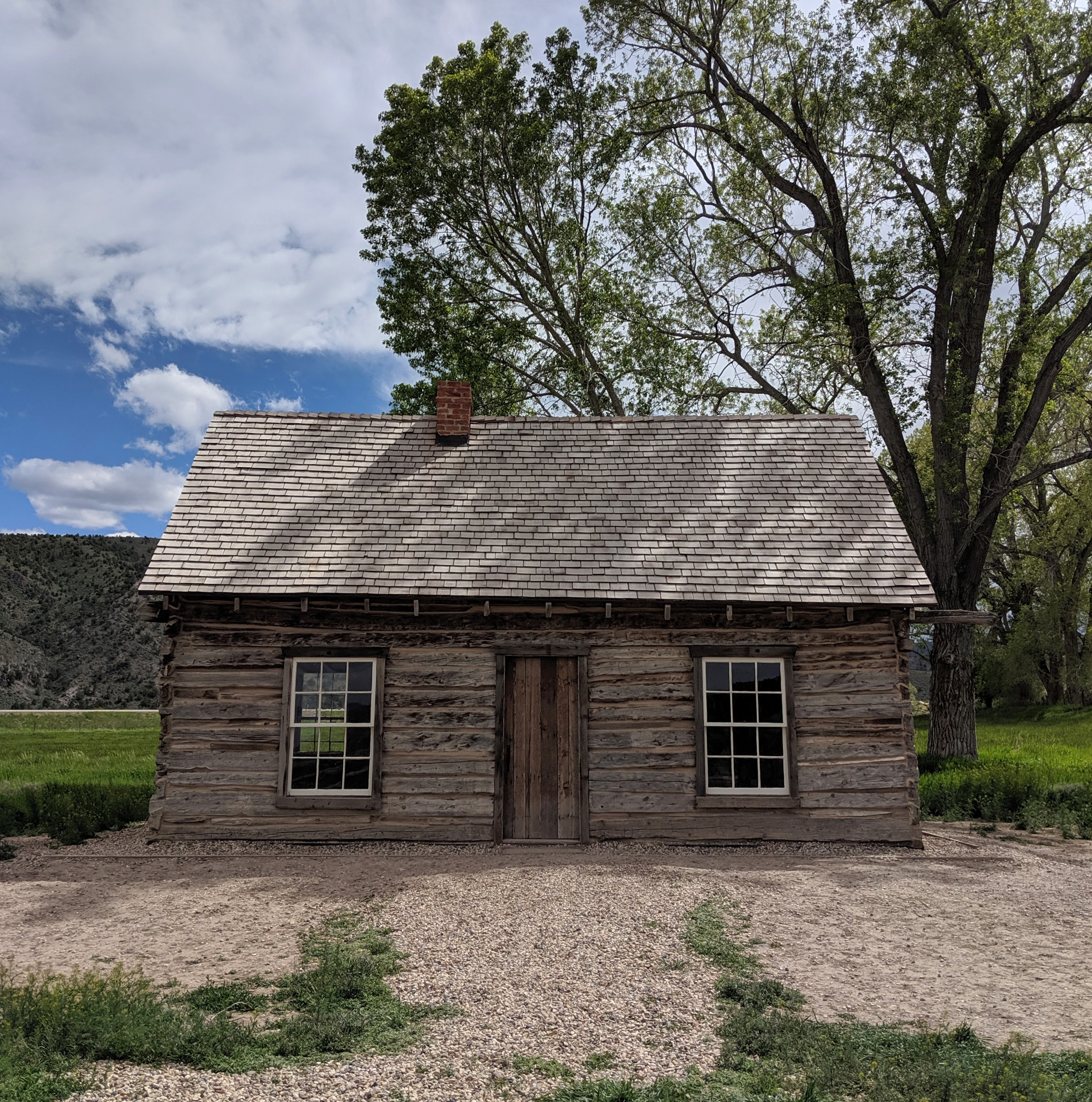
"Butch Cassidy"'s childhood home, 2019

Notable outlaw Butch Cassidy (1866–1908) grew up in Circle Valley just a mile south of Circleville. His family's small cabin, on the outskirts of town, is still standing on the land they homesteaded.

Charlie Siringo visited Circleville while in pursuit of the Wild Bunch. Siringo wrote, "a week was spent in the straggling village of Circleville, and I found out all about 'Butch's' early life and much about his late doings. His true name was Parker, his nickname being 'Sallie' Parker when a boy. This nickname of itself was enough to drive a sensitive boy to the 'bad'. I had hard work to keep from falling in love with Miss Parker, the pretty young sister of 'Butch' Cassidy. She was the deputy postmistress in Circleville, and I made her acquaintance."

Lula Parker Betenson (b. 1884), sister of "Butch" Cassidy, lived in Circleville, dying aged 96 in 1980. Betenson's 1975 book Butch Cassidy, My Brother, co-authored with Dora Flack, recounts her memory that Cassidy visited Circleville in 1924, adding to the controversy over whether he had died previously in South America. This visit by Cassidy to Circleville is also reported by author W. C. Jameson in Butch Cassidy: Beyond the Grave.

Carrie Allen, born in Circleville in 1889, was a spinster and a school teacher. She wrote a history of Circleville. She died in 1983 in Circleville.

== See also ==
- Circleville Massacre
