= Salt Creek (Osage River tributary) =

Stream in the American state of Missouri

Coordinates: 38.023364°N 93.770211°W

Salt Creek is a stream in St. Clair County in the U.S. state of Missouri. It is a tributary of the Osage River.

Salt Creek was named for the fact ranchers left salt near its banks in order to nourish their cattle.
