= Rivière Salée (disambiguation) =

Rivière Salée is French for Salty River, and may refer to:

- Rivière Salée, a river of Martinique.
- Rivière-Salée, a town and commune in Martinique
- Canton of Rivière-Salée, the corresponding Martinique canton
- Rivière Salée (Guadeloupe), a narrow sea-channel separating Grande-Terre and Basse-Terre, the two main islands of the archipelago of Guadeloupe
- River Sallee (Rivière Salée), a village in Grenada
