= Fountain Green massacre =

Coordinates: 39°37.69′N 111°38.41′W

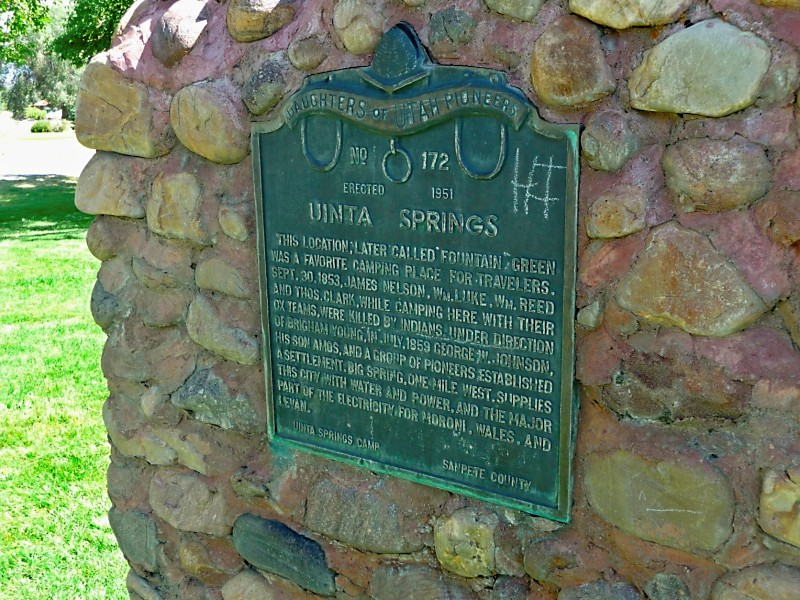
Uinta Springs Camp monument of the Daughters of the Utah Pioneers

The Fountain Green massacre was an incident in 1853 near Fountain Green, Utah when a group of Utes killed four Mormons. The next day, Mormons in nearby Nephi, Utah killed eight Goshutes who had no connection to the earlier killings.

The event is often classified as part of Wakara's War, a series of battles and skirmishes in the region from 1853 to 1854.

A Daughters of the Utah Pioneers monument (no. 172), located in City Park in Fountain Green, Utah, memorializes the event.

== Event ==
In the early morning hours of October 1, 1853, Utes of Sanpitch attacked and killed four men—William Reed, James Nelson, William Luke, and Thomas Clark—who were encamped at Uinta Springs, near the head of Salt Creek Canyon. The men were driving two ox-drawn wagons filled with wheat to Salt Lake City, as the advance party of a larger group headed by a local leader Isaac Morley.

William Luke, an immigrant from Manchester, England, was anxious to go see his three sons, who had recently arrived from England, and may have encouraged the group to hasten its journey. The four men camped at Uinta Springs against Morley's instructions to make camp on the San Pitch River and await the arrival of the main group.

When Morley's group arrived at the camp, they found William Reed stripped, scalped, and disemboweled a short distance from the wagons. Luke and Nelson's throats were cut; they were also disemboweled. The Morley party emptied the wagons of their grain and then loaded three of the bodies for transport to Nephi, Utah (Clark's body later being found by a relative) and as the party readied to move on, numerous Utes appeared on the hillside.

Oral tradition holds that Morley, angry over disobedience to his orders, denied the dead men burial in the town cemetery. Their gravesites are unknown, despite efforts to locate the remains of the four men.

== Revenge massacre ==
The next day, a group of seven Goshute Native Americans uninvolved with the attack at Fountain Green and seeking peace with the settlers at the fort in Nephi, Utah were invited into the fort then murdered and buried in a mass grave. One woman and two children from the Native group were enslaved by the perpetrators. In 2006 the remains of the victims were discovered in Nephi.

== Subsequent violence ==
A little less than five years later, four Danish immigrants—Jens Jorgensen, his wife Hedevig Jorgensen Jens Terklesen, and Christian I. Kjerulf—were slain by Natives in Salt Creek Canyon, while they were en route to settle with other Scandinavian immigrants in the Sanpete Valley. This tragedy, known as the Salt Creek Canyon Massacre, was marked by the brutality with which Jorgensen's wife and unborn child were butchered with a tomahawk.

== See also ==
- List of massacres in Missouri
- Missouri Executive Order 44
- Utah War

== Sources ==
- Bigler, David L. (1998). Forgotten Kingdom: The Mormon Theocracy in the American West, 1847-1896. Arthur H. Clark Company. ISBN 978-0-87062-282-3.
- Gottfredson, Peter (1919). History of Indian Depredations in Utah. Skelton Publishing Company. OCLC 2326617.
- Michno, Gregory & Susan (2008). Forgotten Fights: Little Known Raids and Skirmishes on the Frontier, 1823 to 1890. Mountain Press Publishing Company. ISBN 978-0-87842-549-5.
- Whitney, Orson F. (1892). History of Utah. George Q. Cannon & Sons. OCLC 504189185.
