= Salt Creek (Juab County) =

Creek near Nephi, Utah

Salt Creek is a stream in Juab County, Utah. Its mouth is at an elevation of 5,226 feet / 1,593 meters. Its source is located at 39°48′28″N 111°43′43″W, the confluence of the Left Fork and Right Fork of Salt Creek in the Nebo Basin east of Mount Nebo.

== See also ==
- List of rivers of Utah
