= Wakara's War =

Series of violent raids between Mormons and Native Americans

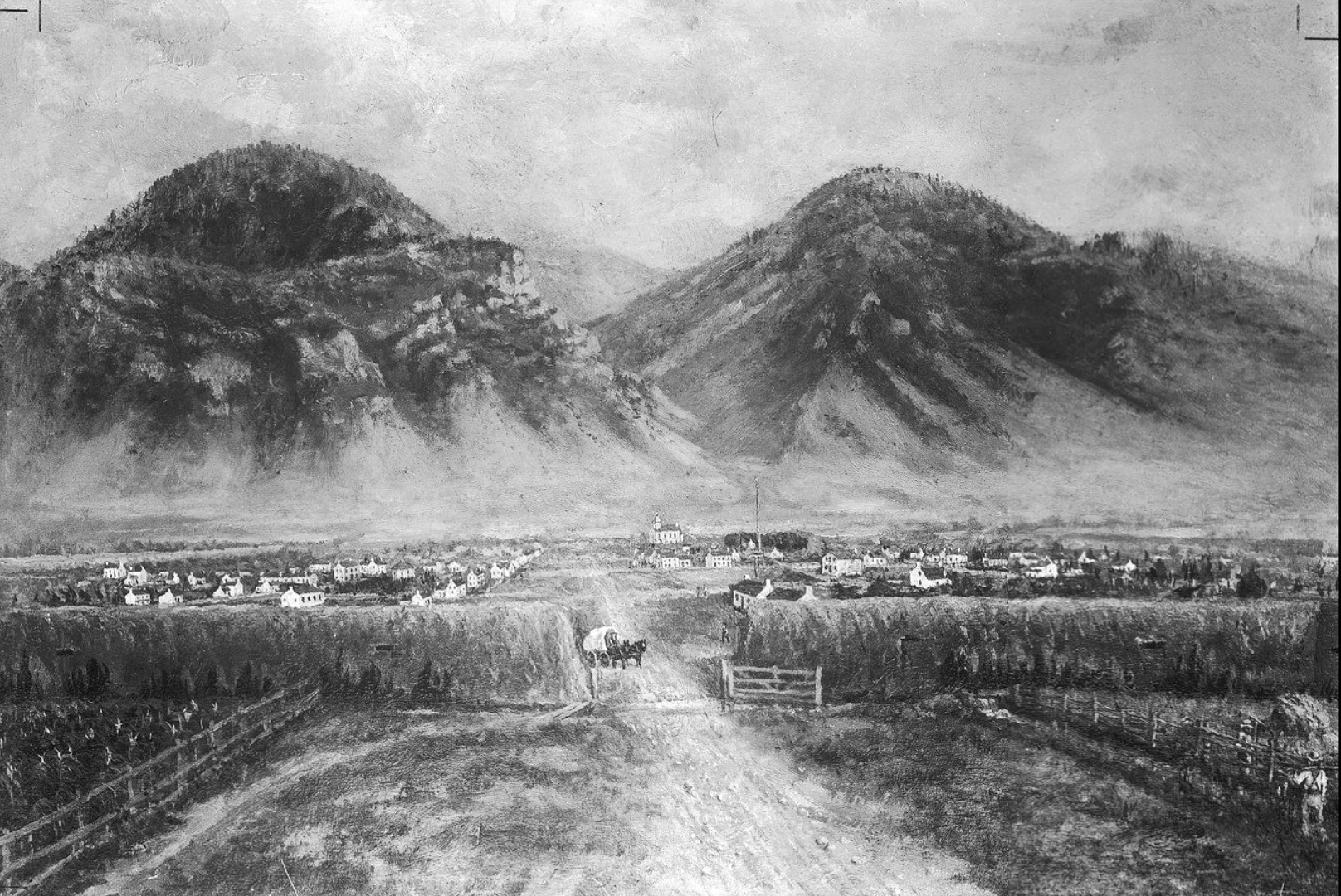
Mud walls constructed around Provo, Utah in 1853 to protect against Indian raids.

Wakara's War, also known as Walker's War, was a dispute between the Ute people and the Mormon settlers in Utah Valley and surrounding areas. This war is characterized as a string of disputes and skirmishes over property and the land from July 1853 to May 1854. This war was influenced by factors such as religious differences, the slave trade, and the division of the Salt Lake Valley.

== Chief Wakara ==
Wakara was a leader of the Ute Native Americans in Utah. He was also known as Wakarum, Walkara, Walkar, Wacker, Wacherr, Watcher, and his white name Walker. Wakara means "yellow" or "brass" in the Numic branch of the Uto-Aztecan language family. It is thought that Wakara went by that name because of his preference for yellow buckskin. The physical characteristics of the land largely separated Wakara's band from other Ute and Shoshone Indians in that area. They subsisted mainly on a hunter-gatherer diet, roaming the land to find the sustenance and supplies that they needed to survive. This was greatly aided by the influence of horses in the Ute culture, especially with Wakara as chief. He was known as the "Napoleon of the Desert", a nickname given for his cunning and strategy in horse raids. Wakara's band had a very profitable slave trade with the Spaniards, in which they traded captives from other tribes for European goods.

== Mormon pioneers ==
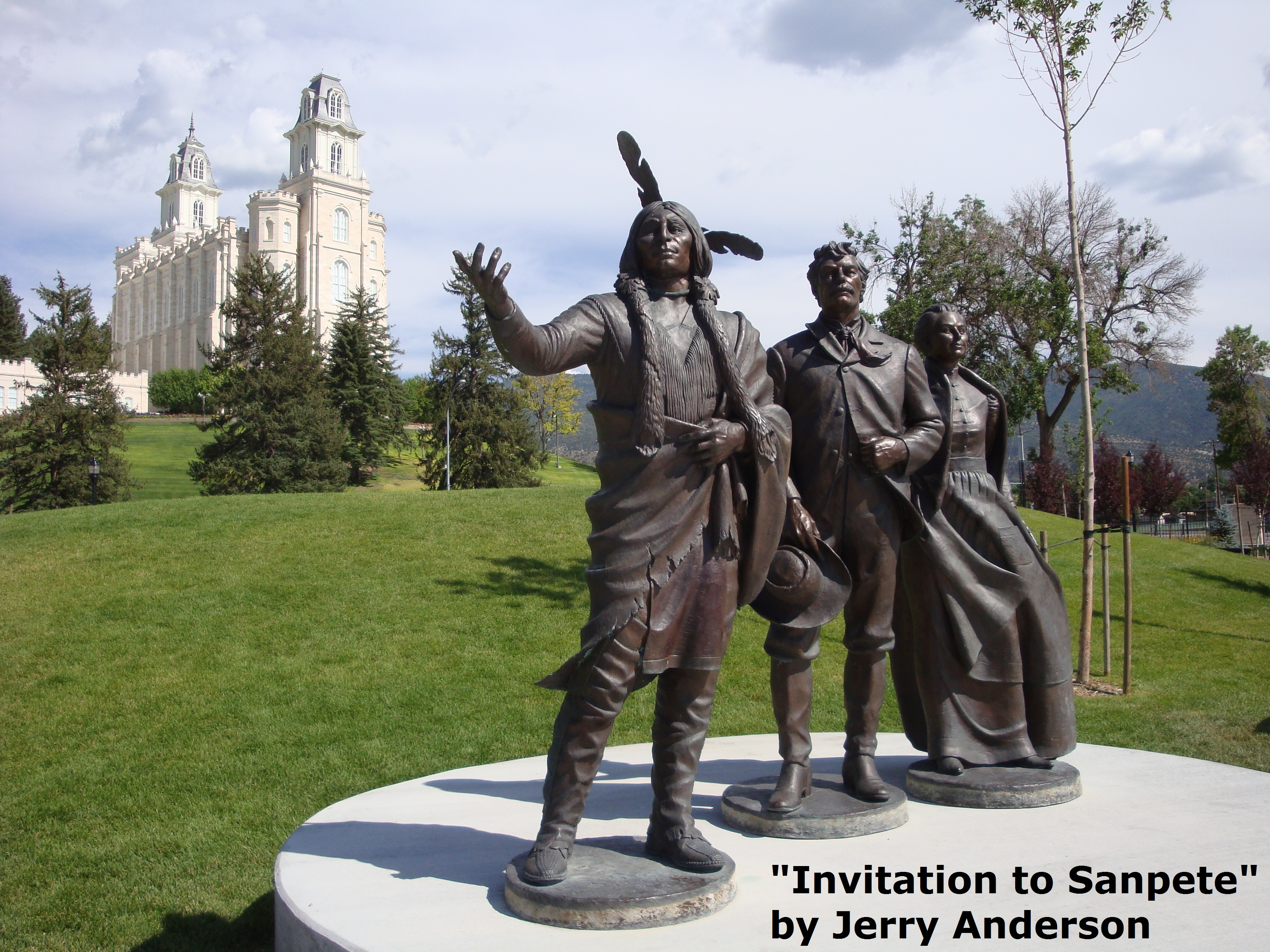
Nameless Indian with European settlers at Pioneer Heritage Gardens in Manti, Utah.

Wakara was the chief of the Paiute Indians at the time that the members of the Church of Jesus Christ of Latter-day Saints (LDS Church), commonly referred to as the Mormon pioneers, began to arrive in Utah and settle the land around 1847. The pioneers were fleeing from religious persecution in Illinois and Missouri and believed that religious freedom would be found outside the United States in lands at the time claimed by Mexico. The Mormons were led west from Illinois by their religious leader, Brigham Young, who was revered among them as a prophet. The Mormon settlers did not account for the indigenous tribes of the Goshute, Ute, and Shoshone whose territory they were wanting to settle outside the Salt Lake Valley, which led to protracted, and at times violent, conflicts. The Salt Lake Valley was claimed by none of the four surrounding tribes, making it an ideal settling place for the early members of the LDS Church.

== Events leading to the war ==
=== Religious differences ===
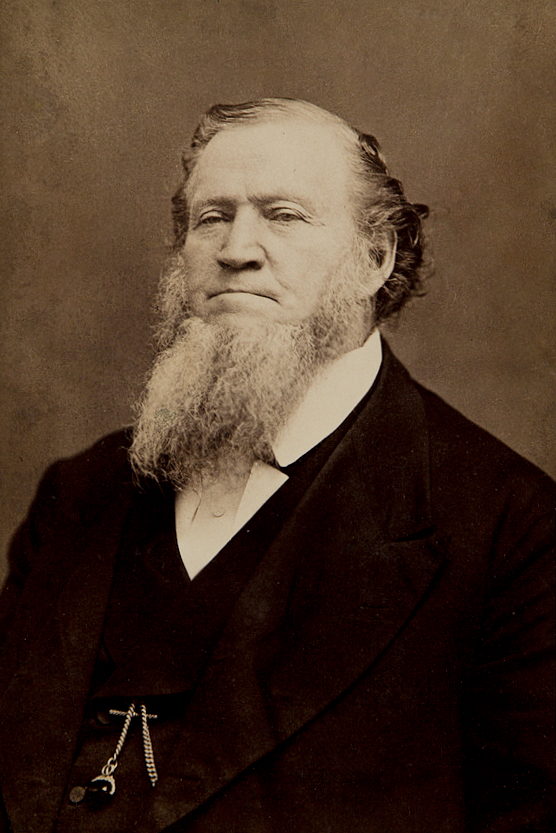
Brigham Young, 2nd president of the LDS Church

In the years following the arrival of the Mormons in the Salt Lake Valley, tensions began to build between the settlers and the Paiutes. The Mormons, led by Brigham Young, believed that the indigenous peoples they encountered were descendants of an ancient splinter group of Hebrews called the Lamanites, who were a prominent group of people in a book of scripture called the Book of Mormon, that they believed was translated by the religion's founder, Joseph Smith. Informed by the church's doctrine at the time, the Mormon settlers believed that the indigenous inhabitants needed to be converted to Mormonism in order to receive spiritual salvation; Chief Wakara himself had been converted.

=== Slave trade ===
Wakara and his band had a profitable slave trade with Mexican traders before the arrival of the Mormons. They traded captives, mostly women and children from the weaker nomadic Paiute and Goshute tribes, with the Mexicans for goods. In order to increase economic wealth, Chief Wakara pressured the Mormon settlers to engage in his prospering slave trade, threatening to kill the slaves unless the settlers bought them.

Although initially opposed to the idea, Brigham Young advised the Mormons to purchase the slaves and raise them as their own children. Young viewed this as a way to purchase the slaves' freedom, believing it to be the moral duty of the settlers to raise the children as Mormons. The relationships between the settlers and the purchased slaves ranged from familial relations to treating the slaves as house servants.

=== Division of the land ===
There were many small disputes regarding the distribution of the land in the Salt Lake Valley. The Paiute Indians frequently went on raids, stealing horses from other tribes and settlers and growing their herds. Chief Wakara led some of the most profitable raids in that region, notably increasing the head count in his band's herd.

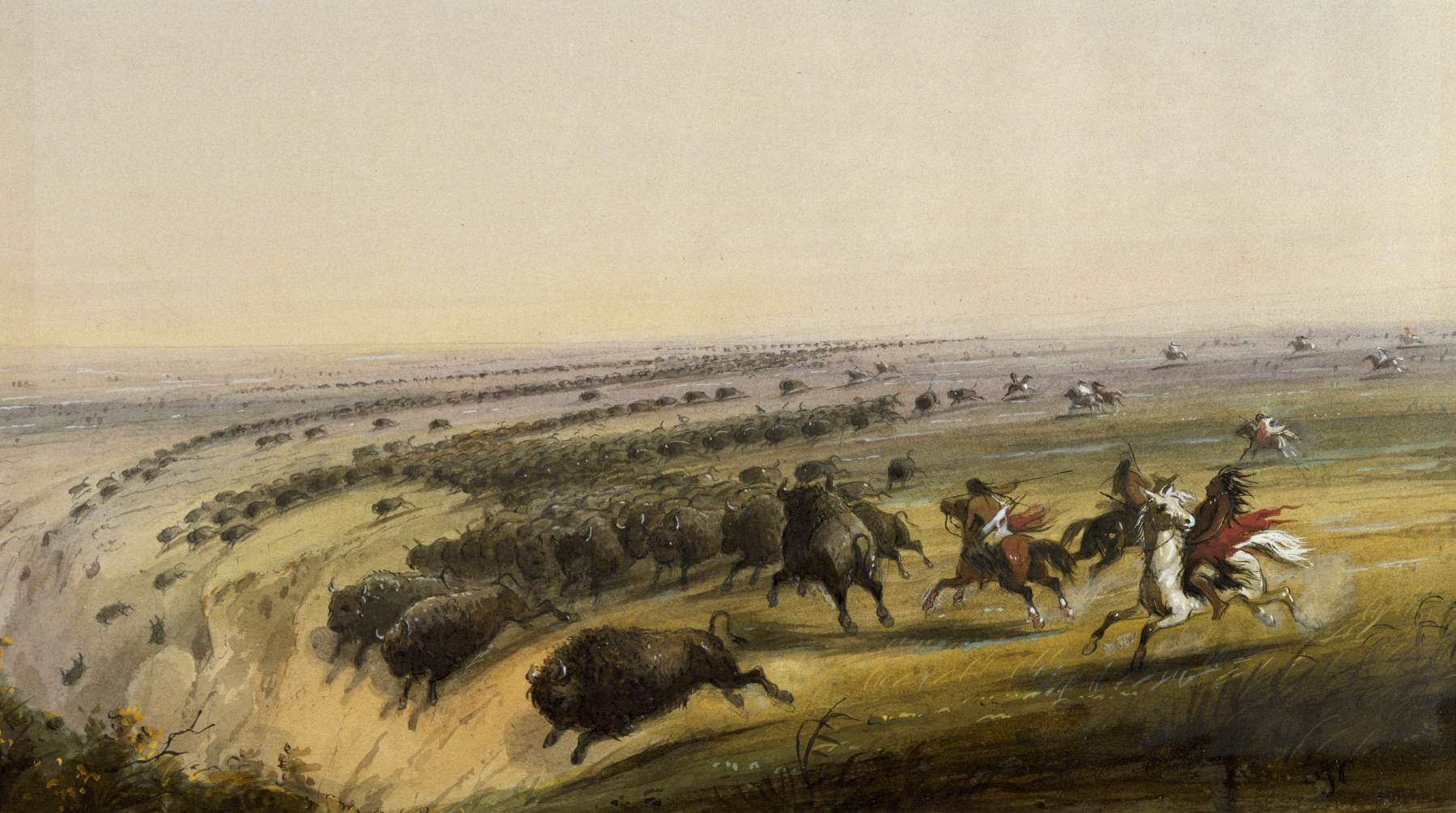
This painting by Alfred Jacob Miller exaggerates the portrayal of Plains Indians chasing buffalo over a small cliff

When the Mormon settlers came, there was an assumption that things would continue to go on as they had been and that there would be a sharing of the land. What the Paiute Indians did not understand was that the settlers were there to stay, and that the pioneers would claim ownership over the lands that they settled. Frequent Indian raids on the settlers' cattle and horses led to conflicts between Wakara's band and Brigham Young with the rest of the Mormon settlers.

Things escalated on July 17, 1853, when Paiute Indians were trading near James Ivie's cabin. A dispute ensued when a Paiute man began beating his wife over a transaction and tried taking it into Ivie's home. This dispute resulted in Ivie killing one of the men present, a relative of Wakara's named Shower-O-Cats. Indian tradition called for Ivie's death, which began a series of skirmishes and confrontations known as Wakara's War, or the Walker War.

== During the war ==
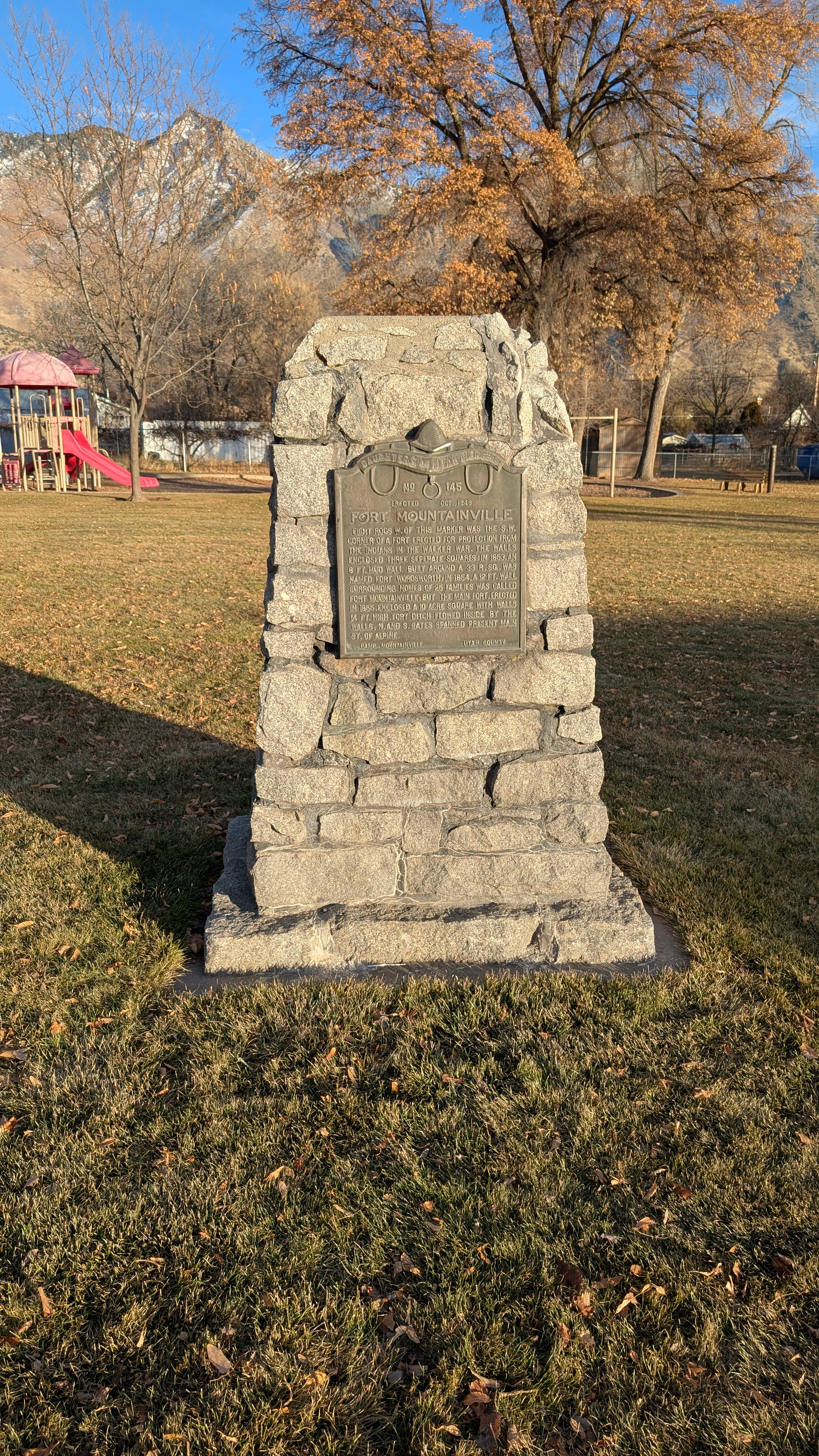
Location of Fort Mountainville, built in Alpine, Utah in 1849.

The Walker War is not necessarily considered a war, rather more a series of raid attempts of the Utes on the settlers. These raids led the members of the LDS Church to come back at the Utes with force as well. However, that was not the original intent of the religious settlers. Their original intent was to use a plan to defend themselves and attempt to improve their relations with the Utes.

Towards the end of July 1853, Major General Daniel H. Wells, of the Utah Territorial Militia, commanded a number of troops to go and attempt to stop the Utes, who they believed were marching to attack a town of members of the LDS Church. Wells was specific in his instruction to not attack the Utes, but to try to capture Chief Wakara, while trying to keep peace. This did not happen, because the orders given by Wells were not received in time. A man named Colonel Conover took the group of troops and attacked, not knowing of the orders from Wells. He went with a group of about one hundred and fifty armed men to pursue these Native Americans. The effects of this event were very large and severe. This event led to many months of attacks from both the Utes and the settlers.

After hearing about this incident, Brigham Young sent a letter of apology for what had happened to Chief Wakara. He even included some tobacco with his letter so that Wakara might accept it better. From this moment on, the members of the LDS Church would put in a strict defense system to protect themselves. Those who did not abide by the orders of the church's First Presidency were to be taught well their lesson so that they would then obey the orders. Members of the church began to move all of their cattle and livestock to Salt Lake to be able to protect them. The Ute Indians decided to use this to their advantage. They would begin to raid these groups of livestock and steal them as they were being moved. Part of Young's plan to defend and keep safe the church members was to stop all trade and exchange with the Ute Indians, as to avoid any confrontation with them. However, it was difficult to completely avoid all confrontation. There were instances in which settlers would sneak into the Indian camps and find stolen livestock, and when they found the people who did it, many times they would kill the Indians. Both sides would continue to provoke and anger each other for a long time. Although there were various murders from both the Utes and the settlers, rarely, if ever, was there ever a large confrontation of the two groups that would be considered a battle. They are described more like raids or small conflicts than a traditional war.

The Utes gave the members of the LDS Church various chances to pay for their wrongdoings, yet many times the church members could not provide what the Utes asked for, or they did not believe that they owed the Utes anything. So, the battles would continue from the latter part of 1853 to early 1854. Then, Chief Wakara decided that he wanted to stop the violence and make peace with the settlers. So, on multiple occasions he attempted at making peace. However, Chief Wakara wanted payments through cattle, guns, whiskey, and many gifts if peace were to be made. On May 11, 1854, the war was officially ended. Chief Wakara and Brigham Young met and came to an agreement and decided to end the bloodshed. The specifics of the agreement are not exactly known, as there is no copy of the proceedings of the treaty to be found. However, there have been some pieces of evidence that show that there were some gifts given for horses that had been stolen.

== Repercussions of the war ==
Although the war had officially ended, that did not mean that there would be no violence between the Utes and the settlers. Chief Wakara would end up dying in 1855, and the peace would then be lost again. The bloodshed between the settlers would continue in following years. Members of the LDS Church and the Utes would find themselves in conflict again during the Tintic War, which took place just a year after the death of Chief Wakara. Although the war was not primarily between the two groups, yet the Utes were stealing some livestock of the settlers, which would lead to the violence. They would also meet again in the Black Hawk War a few years later. The violence finally stopped when the U.S. Government removed the Native Americans from the area, effectively stopping the bloodshed between the settlers and the Utes.
