= American Youth Soccer Organization =

US youth soccer association

- Founded: September 15, 1964; (62 years ago)
- Founders: Bill Hughes, Hans Stierle, Steve Erdos, Ralph Acosta, Ted McLain
- Type: 501(c)(3) not-for-profit public charity
- Purpose: child-first and child-focused youth soccer organization
- Location: 19700 S. Vermont Ave Torrance, CA
- Coordinates: 33.852002°N 118.2904967°W
- Region served: United States (primarily)
- Method: regional youth soccer programs, coaching and referee training programs, administrative training and operating systems to support volunteers.
- Members: 400,000 children, 250,000 volunteers, 800 leagues (Regions)
- Owner: American Youth Soccer Organization
- Key people: Doug Ryan (National President); TBA (National Treasurer); Dan Howald (National Vice President)
- Revenue: $72,650,598
- Employees: 20
- Volunteers: 250,000
- Website: ayso.org

The American Youth Soccer Organization (AYSO) is one of the two main national organizations in youth soccer in the United States for children aged 4 through 19. AYSO was established as a non-profit soccer organization in Torrance (a suburb of Los Angeles, California) at Jefferson Elementary School in 1964 with nine teams. Today the organization claims membership of over 50,000 teams, with over 630,000 participants.

AYSO is headquartered in Torrance, California, and has developed local programs known as "Regions" in all 50 states, the U.S. Virgin Islands, and Trinidad and Tobago. The organization is run primarily by volunteers at its constituent local levels, with approximately 20 paid employees at its national headquarters.

Notable players who started their careers in AYSO programs include Landon Donovan, Adam Starkey, Drew Burnette, Derek Wright, Carlos Bocanegra, Julie Foudy, Eric Wynalda, Shannon Boxx, Brian Ching, Alex Morgan, Kristen Graczyk, Natasha Kai, and Amy Rodriguez.

== Structure ==
AYSO is a California non-profit corporation. Local programs, which are called regions, are not separately incorporated. However, they are given significant autonomy in management of their operations, as long as they are in compliance with AYSO's Bylaws, National Rules and Regulations, and Policy Statements. Each region is managed by a regional commissioner in conjunction with a regional board. Groups of regions in close proximity comprise an "area", which is managed by an area director in conjunction with an area board. Areas are grouped into 14 "sections", each managed by a section director in conjunction with a section board. In addition, some regions administered directly by the national office, particularly those outside the United States, are part of the so-called "Section 99".

The governing body of AYSO is its national board of directors (NBOD), which operates similarly to other boards of directors. Additionally, AYSO also has a number of national commissions, and their respective chairpersons, provide the national president and national board of directors with advice and recommendations on coaching, refereeing, management, tournaments, marketing, eAYSO and development. The advice includes analysis of the impact of proposed or actual program changes including cost and financial impact at the national and local levels; on the specific discipline and community of practice; on other disciplines and national programs; on the standing and perception of AYSO as a national organization within the greater soccer and sports communities and on other potential or actual partners and like-minded organizations.

== The AYSO Office ==
The AYSO Office is located in Torrance, California.

AYSO divides the country into 14 geographic sections based on player population. Section directors are responsible for activities in their respective sections, ensuring that areas and regions comply with all AYSO fundamentals and deliver quality programs.

== Programs ==
=== Coaching program ===
The AYSO coaching program provides training and certification resources to volunteer coaches. The program is designed to promote one of AYSO's guiding 6 Philosophies, namely "Positive Coaching". Age-specific coaching courses provide training for coaches at every level of experience using manuals, handouts, and outlines, supplemented by local instruction programs, camps and clinics held throughout the country, throughout the year.

=== Officiating program ===
The AYSO officiating program provides training for volunteer referees in more than just the Laws of the Game to help ensure officiated games are safe and enjoyable for everyone: the players, the coaches, the spectators, and the referees. There are Six levels of AYSO referee training with USSF cross-certification. Training for referee instructors, administrators and assessors are provided using online resources including video and workbooks for new referees supplemented by local instruction. The AYSO Officiating Program also includes a youth referee program. The youth referee program provides kids with the opportunity to earn service hours.

Renowned FIFA Referee Ken Aston was instrumental in organizing and structuring AYSO's officiating program and was the Chief Instructor for 21 years.

=== Management program ===
The AYSO management program is designed to facilitate the smooth running of AYSO at the local level by providing practical management training for its volunteers. Introductory, Intermediate, and Advanced Regional Management courses teach AYSO's league administrators how to manage their local programs. AYSO also provides in-depth operational manuals to assist administrators at every level of their AYSO program. The Board and Staff Introductory Certification (BASIC) audiovisual presentation gives regional volunteers a basic understanding of their duties.

=== AYSO EXPO ===
The AYSO EXPO is an educational conference conducted annually for each of AYSO's geographic sections. They provide workshops, training seminars, motivational speakers, a vendor show, and a forum for the exchange of ideas and information among AYSO volunteers and staff. The 2015 AYSO EXPO for Section 6 was held in Madison, Wisconsin. The 2013 EXPO was held in Washington D.C.

=== AYSO EPIC ===
AYSO EPIC (formerly known as VIP, Very Important Player) offers children and young adults with disabilities the opportunity to play soccer at their own pace. The practices and games are geared to their needs – with fewer and more flexible rules – allowing for a successful sports experience. Since 1991, AYSO has helped regions and areas establish these programs for players whose physical or mental disabilities make it difficult to successfully participate on mainstream teams. As of 2014, over 3,700 VIP players participate nationally. In order to volunteer with the VIP Program, one must complete Safe Haven Training.

=== Safe Haven Child & Volunteer Protection Program ===
The AYSO Safe Haven Child & Volunteer Protection program trains and certifies volunteers and staff in their positions through AYSO's Safe Haven program, AYSO volunteers are afforded protection under the federal Volunteer Protection Act of 1997. AYSO's volunteer application and screening process reduces the likelihood of abuses occurring while kids are participating in AYSO soccer programs.

=== Extended play ===
In some regions, after the regular open registration season ends, All-star teams and tournament teams are formed in separate divisions from the most skilled players in the league. Other regions and areas have parallel "extended play" programs that operate at the same time as the standard primary program. The different levels are referred to as region, area, and section teams.

On May 4, 2009, AYSO announced the launch of AYSO FLEX as an umbrella for new pilot programs to encourage the growth of extended play options. Regions and areas are permitted to apply to pilot "Extra" programs, to operate at the same time as the standard primary program. Under the Extra program, there are two options: "Concurrent", in which players must play in the standard primary program to participate in Extra; and "Side-by-Side", in which players participate only in one or the other program.

== History ==
AYSO was co-founded by Hans Stierle and Bill Hughes with the support of Ted McClean, Ralph Acosta and Steve Erdos in 1964. Stierle organized youth soccer games for the Los Angeles Soccer Club, a German club in North Hollywood that played against other local ethnic (mostly European) clubs.

To avoid the cross-town trip to the games, Stierle thought to get boys in his Torrance suburb interested in the world's most popular game. The first AYSO league started with nine teams, and stressed Open Registration: "Anyone can sign up; you do not need to belong to one of the ethnic clubs."

Stierle's own team had strong players from the LA Soccer Club team (including Sigi Schmid, who went on to play and coach at UCLA and coach the Los Angeles Galaxy and the Seattle Sounders FC), and won or tied nearly all its games. To even things out and make the experience more competitive and enjoyable for the other teams, the policy of Balanced Teams was adopted, whereby the stronger players were distributed around the league. This had a slightly perverse effect, as some weaker players who formerly played every minute were forced to the bench by the newly arrived stars. To overcome this, the policy "Everyone Plays" was adopted, which mandated at least half a game for all players. That, in turn, led to AYSO games having specific times for substitutions so they could be monitored: halfway through the first half, half-time, halfway through the second half, and for injuries.

== Sponsorship ==
AYSO operates through player fees collected by the local regions and various sponsor categories. Premier sponsors include Score Sports (uniforms). UK International (AYSO Soccer Camps), Sator Soccer (AYSO Store), and Molten Corporation are licensees.

== Affinity partners ==
AYSO partners include: Positive Coaching Alliance, National Alliance for Youth Sports, Character Counts Coalition, United States Soccer Federation, U.S. Soccer Foundation, Major League Soccer, National Soccer Coaches Association of America, and the National Recreation and Park Association.

== See also ==
- United States men's national under-17 soccer team
- United States women's national under-17 soccer team
- United States Youth Soccer Association
- US Youth Soccer National Championships
