= James B. Staker House =

- U.S. National Register of Historic Places
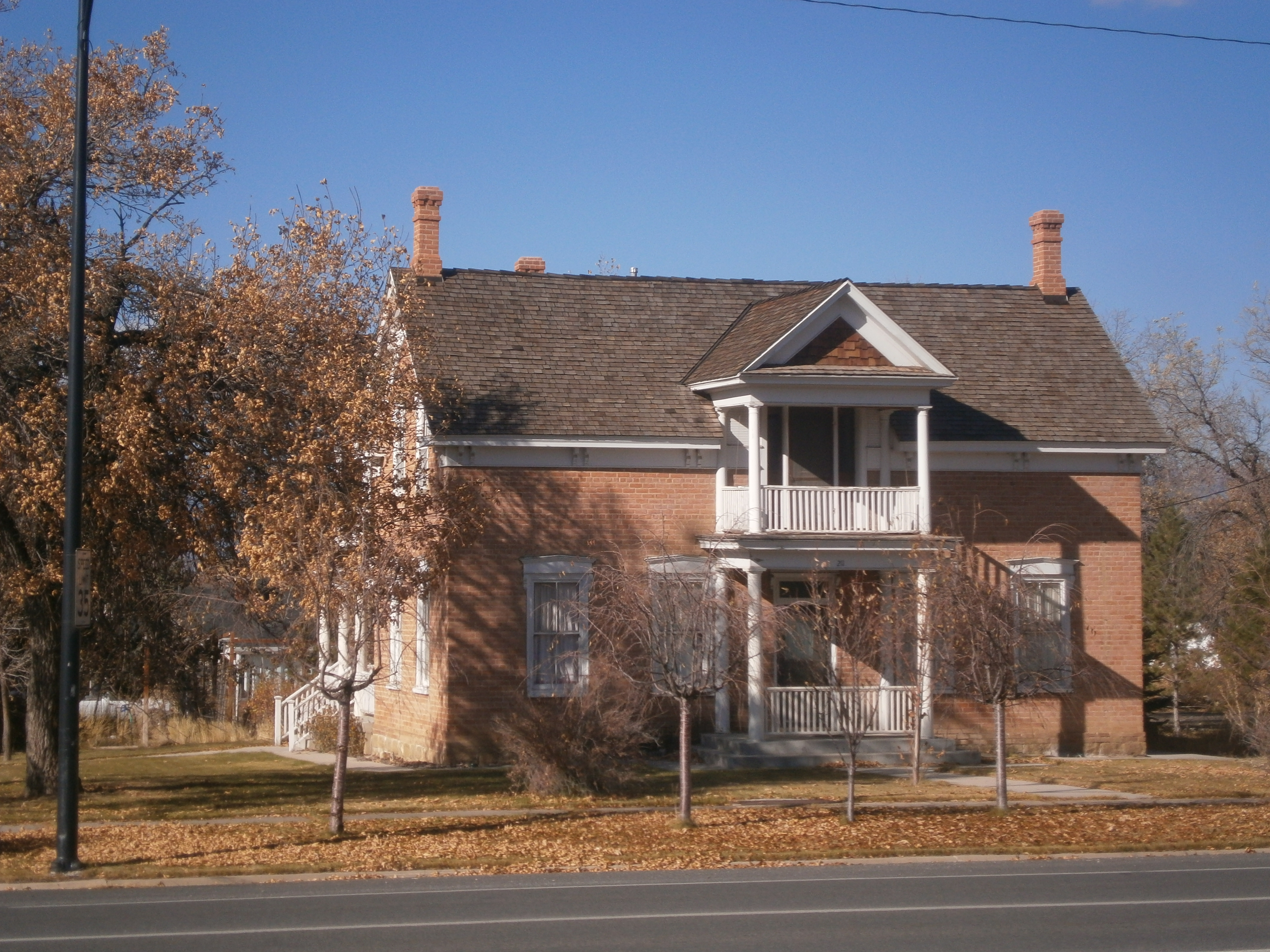

- Location within Utah Location within the United States
- Location: 211 N. State St., Mount Pleasant, Utah
- Coordinates: 39°33′00″N 111°27′19″W
- Area: less than one acre
- Built: c.1880
- Architectural style: Sanpete vernacular
- NRHP reference No.: 80003954
- Added to NRHP: October 3, 1980

The James B. Staker House, or Staker House, at 211 N. State St. (on U.S. Route 89) in Mount Pleasant, Utah, was built around 1880. It was listed on the National Register of Historic Places in 1980.

It is a red brick one-and-a-half-story central passage plan house. It has a two-tier pedimented portico with Tuscan columns. It has stylized Italianate paired brackets supporting its cornice. It has a rear T-section with a similar two-tier portico.
