= Hubbardsville, New York =

- Hamlet
- Location within New York Location within the United States
- Coordinates: 42°49′04″N 75°27′48″W
- Country: United States
- State: New York
- County: Madison
- Town: Hamilton
- Elevation: 1,214 ft (370 m)
- Time zone: UTC-5 (Eastern (EST))
  - Summer (DST): UTC-4 (EDT)
- ZIP code: 13355
- Area codes: 315 & 680
- GNIS feature ID: 953359

Hubbardsville is a hamlet within the town of Hamilton, Madison County, New York, United States. The community is 4.2 miles (6.8 km) east of Hamilton. Hubbardsville has a post office with ZIP code 13355.

== Notable people from Hubbardsville ==
- Welcome Chapman - Utah pioneer, stone cutter and early leader in the LDS Church.
