= Don MacAdam =

Canadian ice hockey coach (1950–2026)

Donald Joseph MacAdam (August 14, 1950 – November 10, 2026) was a Canadian professional ice hockey coach. He served as the head coach of Hungary men's national ice hockey team.

== Career ==
In the first half of the 1970s, MacAdam played as a defender for the ice hockey team of University of New Brunswick, which competed in the CIAU championship. Following his playing career, he turned to coaching, and worked as the head coach of University of New Brunswick between 1977 and 1985. From 1986 to 1989, next to head coach Jacques Demers he was the assistant coach of Detroit Red Wings in the National Hockey League. In the early 1990s, he worked as the head coach for Cape Breton Oilers and New Haven Senators in the American Hockey League. In the late 1990s, he worked as a head coach in Japan, and as a scout for the Canada men's national ice hockey team. From 2000 to 2004, he served as the head coach of Charlotte Checkers, before coaching Dayton Bombers. In 2006, MacAdam along with Gail Reynolds published the book Coaching Hockey for Dummies with the support of National Alliance for Youth Sports. In 2014, MacAdam moved to HC Bozen–Bolzano in the Italian Serie A. From 2018 to 2019, he was the head coach of HSC Csíkszereda in the Erste Liga. In 2019, the ice hockey team of Ferencváros signed him as the new professional director of the club's junior teams.

From 2023, he was the head coach of Hungary men's national ice hockey team.

== Death ==
MacAdam died on November 10, 2026, at the age of 76.
