= Junior Ioane =

Samoan gridiron football player (born 1977)

No. 92, 94
- Position: Defensive tackle

Personal information
- Born: July 21, 1977 (age 49); Apia, Western Samoa
- Listed height: 6 ft 4 in (1.93 m)
- Listed weight: 320 lb (145 kg)

Career information
- High school: North Sanpete (Mount Pleasant, Utah, U.S.)
- College: Arizona State
- NFL draft: 2000: 4th round, 107th overall pick

Career history
- Oakland Raiders (2000–2002); Houston Texans (2003–2005); New York Giants (2006)

Career NFL statistics
- Total tackles: 54
- Solo tackles: 33
- Sacks: 1.5
- Stats at Pro Football Reference

Junior Burton Ioane (born July 21, 1977) is an American former professional football player who was a defensive tackle in the National Football League (NFL) for the Oakland Raiders and Houston Texans. He played college football for the Arizona State Sun Devils and was selected by the Raiders in the fourth round of the 2000 NFL draft. He was also a member of the New York Giants in 2006 but spent the entire season on injured reserve.

== Early life ==
Ioane attended North Sanpete High School in Mount Pleasant, Utah, where he was a standout in football, basketball, and track and field. In football, he won All-State honors. In track and field, he won the State Champion in the shot put as a senior.

== College career ==
Ioane was an Honorable Mention All-Pac-10 selection in 1999. Prior to attending Arizona State, Ioane played at Snow College in Ephraim, Utah.

== Professional career ==
Ioane was selected by the Oakland Raiders in the fourth round, with the 107th overall pick, of the 2000 NFL draft. He was waived by the Raiders on August 31, 2003.

In August 2003, Ioane was signed by the Houston Texans. He was released by the Texans on May 3, 2006.

In May 2006, Ioane was signed by the New York Giants. He spent the 2006 season on injured reserve and was released by the Giants on February 12, 2007.
