= Manti High School =

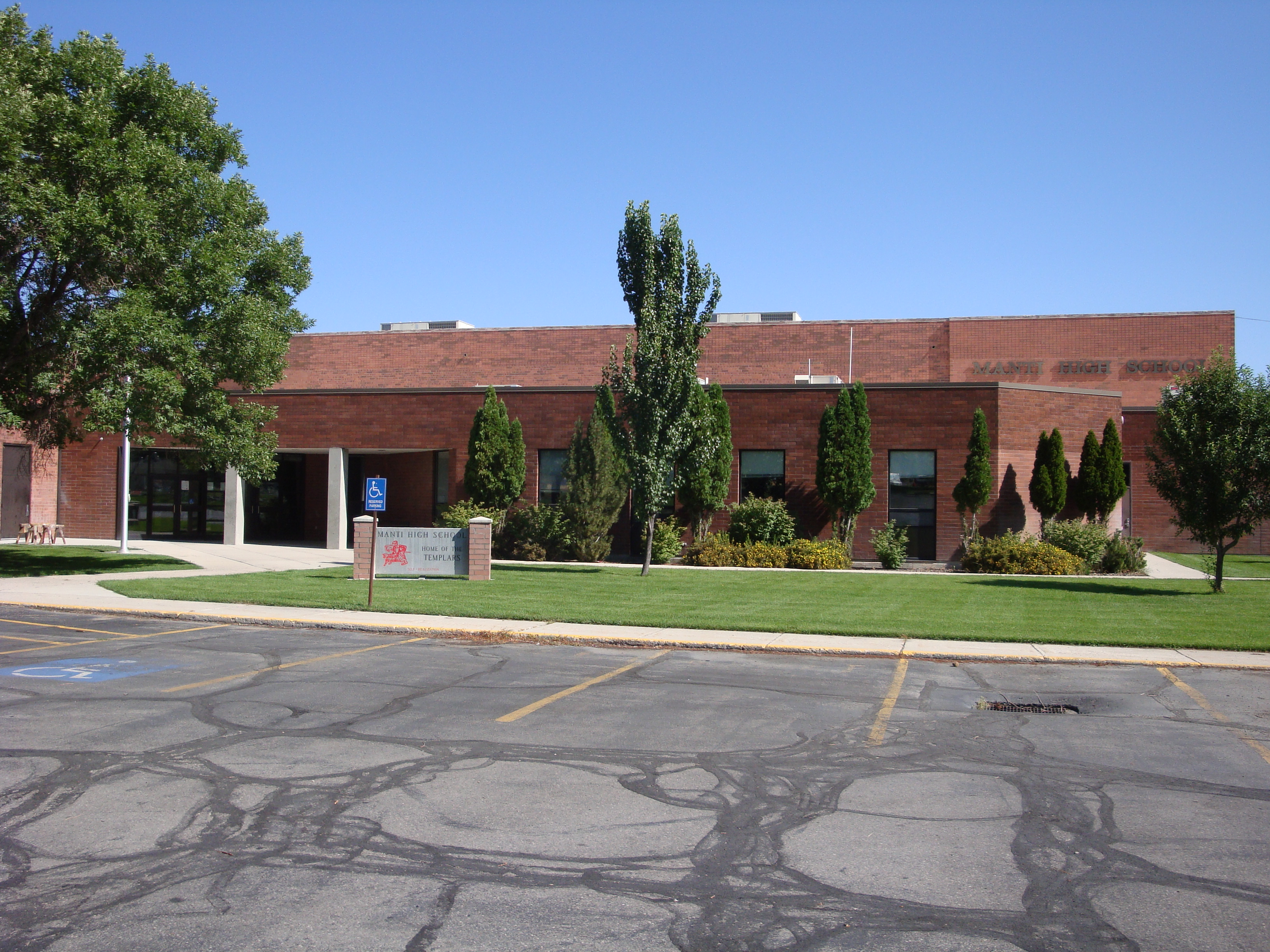

Location
- 100 West 500 North; Manti, Utah 84642; United States; 39°16′26″N 111°38′20″W

Information
- Type: Public
- Motto: Self-Realization
- Established: 1905
- CEEB code: 450185
- NCES School ID: 490096000553
- Principal: Karen Soper
- Teaching staff: 34.29 (FTE)
- Grades: 9–12
- Enrollment: 690 (2024–2025)
- Student to teacher ratio: 20.12
- Colors: Red and white
- Team name: Templars
- Rival: North Sanpete High School
- Newspaper: The Templar Trumpet
- Feeder schools: Ephraim Middle School
- Website: www.ssanpete.org/mhs-home.html
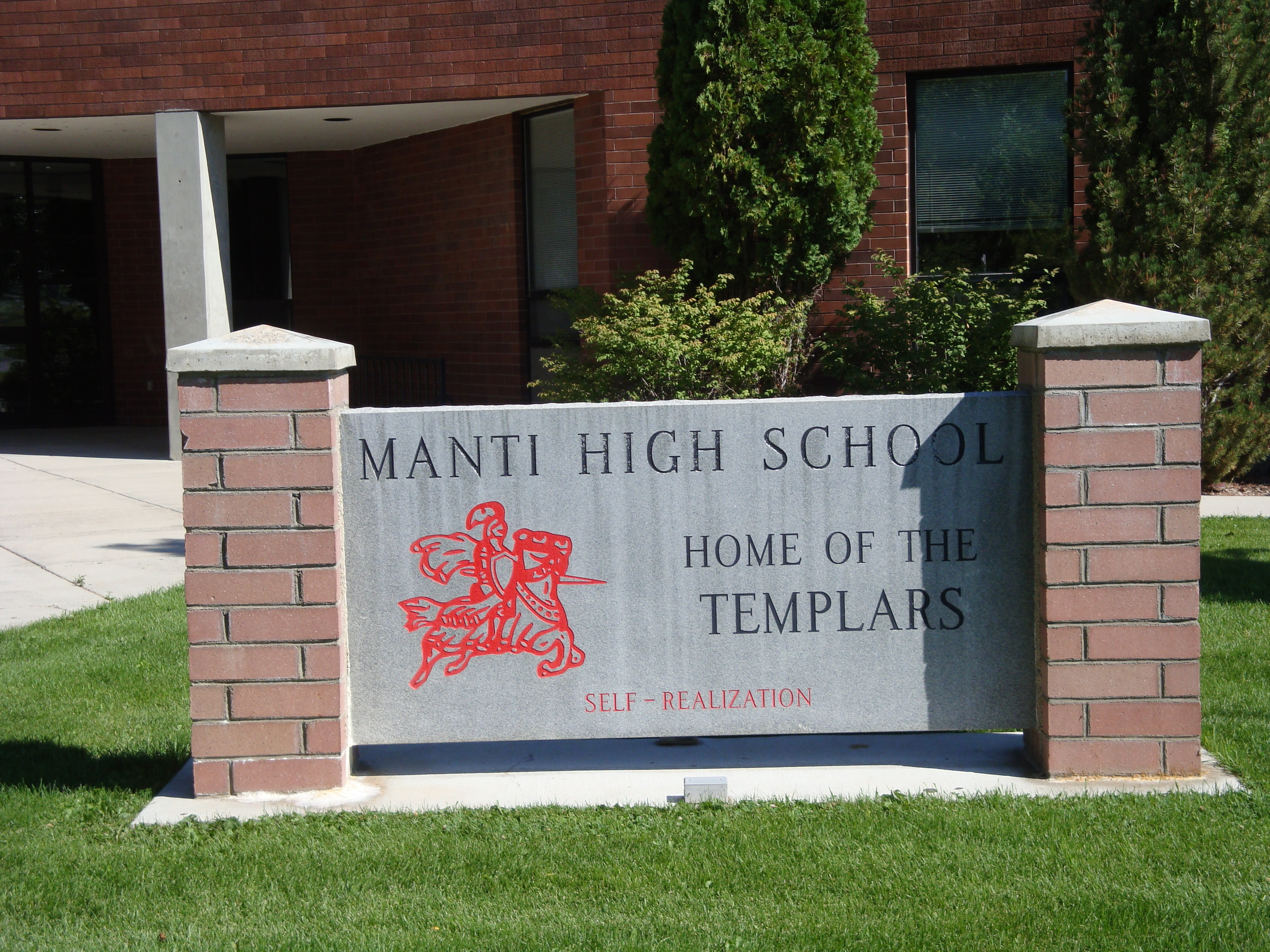
- Manti High School – main entrance sign

Manti High School is a public high school located in Manti, Utah, United States, and is part of the South Sanpete School District. Students from Manti, Ephraim, and Sterling attend the school. It is fed by Ephraim Middle School, which is in turn fed by Ephraim Elementary School and Manti Elementary School.

== History and traditions ==
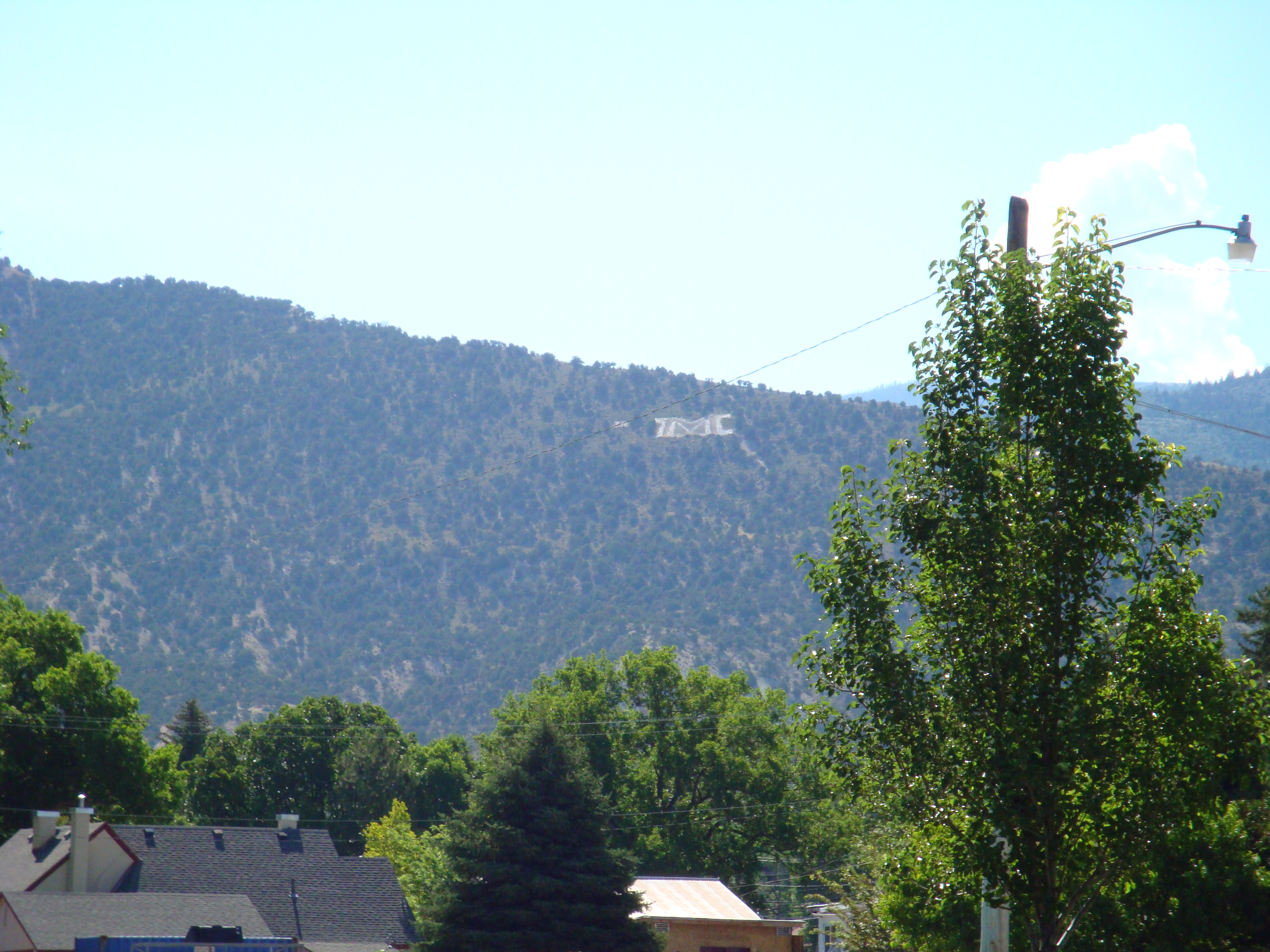
View of Manti High School "M" from Manti High School main parking lot

Manti High School was founded as a one-year high school in 1905, at the time the southernmost high school in the state. About 75 to 80 students from throughout central and southern Utah attended. Classes initially held in the tabernacle owned by the Church of Jesus Christ of Latter-day Saints, but by 1906 a dedicated white brick building was completed for the high school. By 1909 it expanded to a four-year school. Manti high school was moved to a second dedicated building in 1923. In February 1980 the building where the high school currently stands on the north end of Manti was completed. In 1999 the building was expanded with an additional gymnasium (named after Wilbur Braithwaite) as well as additional classrooms and a commons area.

=== The "M" ===
The tradition of having an "M" representing the high school on the mountain likely originated in an attempt to imitate the "Y" for Brigham Young University in Provo or the "S" for Snow College in Ephraim. Originally the "M" was on Duncan Hill in 1919. In 1928–29 the block M was made in its current location out of plain rocks over about an acre of land. In 1930 the "M" was whitewashed to enhance visibility and has been whitewashed in every weather-permitting year since. The whitewashing tradition was originally called May Day in 1942 but has since been shortened to M-day. In 1977 the class of 1978 created the number "78" to the right of the "M" for their graduation year. On M-day (which typically takes place the last week of school), freshmen, sophomores, and juniors clear vegetation from around the M and whitewash it to keep it visible. In addition, the juniors change the number to the right of the "M" to the last two digits of their graduation year. As a tradition, the outline of the "M" is often lit up during homecoming week.

=== Letter-lighting ===
The letter-lighting tradition began in 1931. Each year during homecoming week, students from each class fill white paper bags with dirt and place a candle in each. These bags are used to outline shapes for their class (S for seniors, J for juniors, S for sophomores, and F for freshmen). The bags are laid out in the nearby fairgrounds in the grandstand arena, and at night the candles are lit. Letter-lighting at the current location in the fairgrounds began in either 2001 or 2002. Previously letter-lighting took place by students collecting cans, filling them with used motor oil, and outlining their class letters on the mountainside up Manti Canyon over the old gravel pit. When the tradition began in 1931 the letters were arranged vertically with the senior "S "at the top. Later the letters were arranged to be horizontally in line with each other. The tradition also included a bonfire and hot-dog roast at Brox's Campgrounds. The indefinite moving of the tradition to the fairgrounds in 2001 or 2002 was due to worries about fire and environmental damage from the oil.

== Academic competitions ==
Manti High School took first place in their division in the Snow College math contest in 2007, 2010, 2011, 2013, 2014, 2015, 2016, 2017, 2018, and 2019. Manti High School also had the first place individual in the division in 2005, 2006, 2007, 2008, 2010, 2011, 2014, 2015, 2018.

The Manti High School speech and debate team has won several regional tournaments.

In both 2016 and 2017 the Manti Science Olympiad team placed 11th overall in the state, competing against schools of all sizes.

== Athletics ==
In the first few years that Manti High had a basketball team, it defeated nearly every opponent and placed third in the State Invitational Tournament. The boys' tennis team claimed 11 state titles from 1953-1994 under coach Wilbur Braithwaite who coached tennis there for 53 years.

Manti moved up to the 3A classification for the 2009–2010 school year. Manti moved back to the 2A classification in 2011. In the 2017–2018 school year, Manti High School moved back up to 3A. In 2008 the school officially began to sponsor a boys soccer team.

=== State championships ===
- Baseball: 1987, 1991, 1996, 2015
- Boys basketball: 1966, 2003, 2008, 2015, 2018, 2020, 2023
- Girls basketball: 1984
- Drill team: 1999, 2002, 2003, 2004, 2005, 2006, 2013
- Football: 1999, 2003, 2011, 2012
- Boys soccer: 2012
- Girls soccer: 2019
- Softball: 1992, 1995, 1997, 2005, 2006, 2007, 2009, 2012, 2014, 2016
- Boys tennis: 1953, 1964, 1965, 1970, 1971, 1977, 1979, 1980, 1982, 1993, 1994, 2012
- Girls tennis: 1977, 2013

== Notable alumni ==
- A. Theodore Tuttle, LDS Church General Authority, 1958–1986; graduated from Manti High School in 1937
- Derek Wright, American football player for the Carolina Panthers, graduated from Manti in 2016
- Kalon Ludvigson, won a gold medal and two silver medals at three World Cup competitions; graduated from Manti in 2005
- Kay McIff, former member of the Utah House of Representatives
- Wilbur Braithwaite, graduated from Manti High School and later returned as basketball and tennis coach
