= Wilbur Braithwaite =

Wilbur T. Braithwaite
Biographical details
- Born: May 24, 1926; Manti, Utah
- Died: April 12, 2010 (aged 83); Manti, Utah

Coaching career (HC unless noted)
- 1951–1988: Manti High School (Utah) basketball
- 1951–2005: Manti High School (Utah) tennis

Head coaching record
- Overall: 534–267 (basketball)

Accomplishments and honors

Championships
- 11 Utah state tennis (1953, 1964, 1965, 1970, 1971, 1977, 1979, 1980, 1982, 1993, 1994); 1 Utah state basketball (1966)

Awards
- Utah Coach of the Year (1966); Utah Interscholastic Athletic Administrators Association (UIAAA) Director of the Year (1982); President, Utah High School Basketball Coaches Association (1983–1984); UHSAA Coaching Award (1987–1988); UHSAA 2A Coach of the Year (1988); Utah Summer Games Hall of Honor (1988); NFHS National High School Hall of Fame (1989); UIAAA Distinguished Service Award (1989); Olympic Torch Bearer for Manti, Utah (2002); National Federation of State High School Associations (NFHS) Award of Merit (2006)

Records
- 0 technical fouls in 37 years as basketball coach

Wilbur T. Braithwaite (May 24, 1926 – April 12, 2010) was a high school basketball and tennis coach for Manti High School. He was honored with the National Federation of State High School Associations (NFHS) award of Merit in 2006, and was selected as an Olympic torch bearer for his city Manti, Utah, on February 5, 2002.

"Coach" was also known as a poet, philosopher, business-owner, musician, composer, and pen-pal. He is believed to have written thousands of uplifting, hand-written letters over his life to people all over the country including coaches John Wooden and Bob Knight.

== Personal life and education ==
Wilbur Braithwaite was born to Charles G. and Eva Tuttle Braithwaite in Manti, Utah, and graduated from Manti High School. During World War II, at the age of 18, he served in Company A of the 253rd Regiment, 63rd Infantry Division in the European Theater of Operations. He was injured by a "Bouncing Betty" landmine and took 11 months to recover. He received the Purple Heart for these wounds presented near the border of France and Southern Germany.

After he returned home, Braithwaite enrolled at Snow College. He also attended Weber State College, and Utah State University and played basketball and tennis there. Ultimately he earned a master's degree in physical education and counseling from the University of Michigan. He turned down a job offer to be a physical education teacher and tennis coach from Utah State University to work at Manti High School in 1951.

On July 18, 1952, he married Jane Anderson in the Manti Utah Temple. Together they had seven children. Braithwaite was an active member of the Church of Jesus Christ of Latter-day Saints and one of the most visible and supportive members of the Braithwaite Family Organization. He died in his home in 2010.

== Coaching career ==
Braithwaite coached varsity tennis for 52 years, which included 11 state championship teams. He provided 40 years of free summer tennis instruction. In 37 years of coaching high school basketball, Braithwaite was never given a technical foul.

== Accomplishments and Honors ==
In 1999, Manti High School named its new gym and tennis courts after Braithwaite. In 1989, he was inducted into the National Federation of State High School Associations Hall of Fame. In 2004, he was inducted into the Utah Tennis Hall of fame, and in 2006 he was inducted into the Utah Sports Hall of Fame.

== Philosophy ==
Braithwaite's philosophy appeared in Coach's Quarterly. A poem of his appeared on the front page of The Washington Coach (the official publication of the Washington State Coaches Association) in fall 2002.

== See also ==
- Utah High School Activities Association
- National Federation of State High School Associations
