= Walkara =

Native American chief (c.1808–1855)

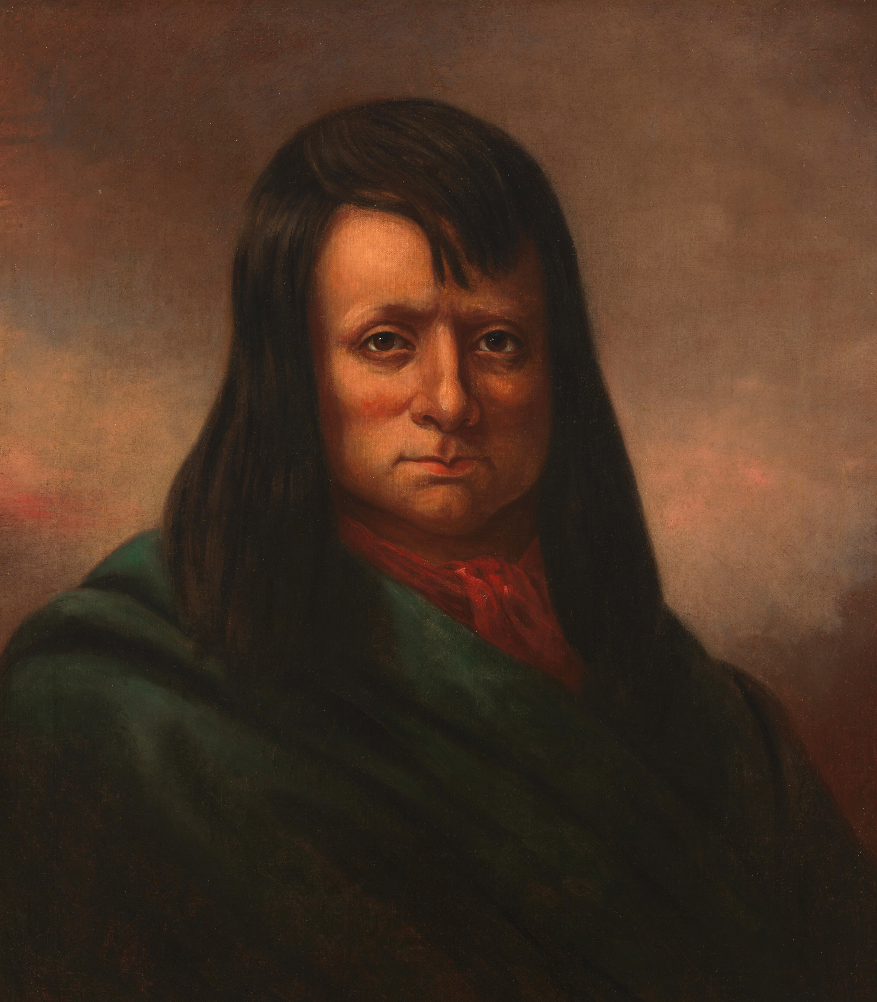
- Walkara, painted by Solomon Nunes Carvalho
- Born: 1808; Utah
- Died: 1855 (aged 47); Utah

Chief Walkara (c. 1808 – 1855; also known as Wakara, Wahkara, Chief Walker or Colorow) was a Northern shoshone leader of the Utah Indians known as the Timpanogo and Sanpete Band. He had a reputation as a diplomat, horseman and warrior, and a military leader of raiding parties in Wakara's War.

He was the most prominent Native American chief in the Utah area when the Mormon Pioneers arrived in 1847. One observer described Walkara in 1843 as: "the principal ruling chief... owing his position to great wealth. He is a good trader, trafficking with the whites and reselling goods to such of his nation as are less skillful in striking a bargain."

In 1865, some ten years after his death, the Timpanogo agreed to go live on the Uintah Reservation under Chief Tabby-To-Kwanah and merged with the Northern Shoshone. Walkara is often referred to as Ute, but this is incorrect. Ute is a blanket name for many tribes. The Shoshone have cultural and linguistic heritage as part of the Numic branch of the Uto-Aztecan language family. Walkara is Shoshone and his name, Walkara, means Hawk, in Shoshone.

== Timpanogos Chief ==
Walkara and his brother Arapeen

Walkara was born in approximately 1808 along the Spanish Fork River in Utah. He was one of the five sons of a chief of the Timpanogos Tribe. He spent much time fishing along the Utah Lake shores in what is now Provo and Vineyard. Walkara could communicate in Spanish, English, and native languages. His brothers included Chief Arapeen, for whom the Arapeen Valley near Sterling, Utah was named; Chief San-Pitch, for whom Sanpete County is named; Chief Kanosh, for whom a town was named; and Chief Sowiette.

He gathered a raiding band of warriors from Great Basin tribes, Ute, Paiute and Shoshone, and often rode with his brothers on raids. His band raided ranches and attacked travelers in the Great Basin and along the Old Spanish Trail between New Mexico and California. Small native bands and tribes in the area paid him tribute in return for protection and assistance. Walkara was often distinguished by the yellow face paint that he wore.

Some people called him, 'The Greatest Horse thief in History.' In California, especially, Walkara was known as a great horse thief, due to his stealing around 3,000 horses in Southern California in the 1840s. In some of these raids, the band fought Cahuilla leader Juan Antonio. Mountain men James Beckwourth and Thomas "Pegleg" Smith were involved in this campaign and were known to trade with Walkara, providing the band with whiskey in return for horses. In 1845 Benjamin Davis Wilson, Justice of the Peace and assistant for Indian affairs in Riverside County, was commissioned to track down Walkara and his marauders and bring them to justice, but never succeeded. Their mission was interrupted by the discovery of the Big Bear Lake area. No additional account of the pursuit was ever reported. Horsethief Canyon and Little Horsethief Canyon in the Cajon Pass are named for Walkara's exploits. Several men were killed in both canyons.

== Mormon era ==
When Mormon pioneers arrived in what is today known as Utah in 1847, they were caught between the Shoshone and the Ute: both tribes claimed the Salt Lake Valley. The settlers refused to pay the Shoshone for the land, knowing that they would have to pay the Ute as well. Brigham Young, the president of the Church of Jesus Christ of Latter-day Saints (LDS Church), recommended the Mormon settlers avoid trading with Native American tribes. At this time, the Ute bands of Indians were divided, but Walkara's band was one of the most influential. Walkara recognized that trading with the settlers would enable his band to become more powerful. However, the Ute were angered by the Mormons building a permanent settlement in the area, and Walkara favored driving them out by force. His brother, Sowiette, wanted to accommodate the Mormons. After initial disagreement, Walkara conceded to Sowiette. Instead of war, the Mormons initially had peace with the Timpanogo.

The first act of violence between the Ute and the Mormon settlers occurred on March 5, 1849. Some Ute had disregarded their leaders' instruction not to steal from the Mormons, and had killed and stolen livestock from the settlers. In retaliation, the settlers set out to find those responsible. They ambushed some Ute, resulting in six killed, in an event known as the Battle Creek massacre. Later in April, Walkara supported Ute attacks on Fort Utah; nevertheless, Young and Walkara entered into a peaceful relationship by May. In late 1849, Walkara met with Young, asking him to send men to help settle Ute land, and with that request, settlers including Welcome Chapman went to the Sanpete Valley.

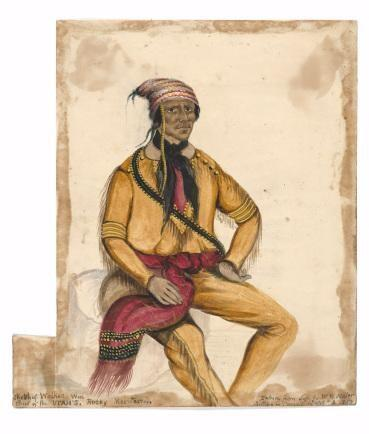
Walkara

Young dispatched a company of about 225 settlers, under the direction of Isaac Morley. The settlers arrived at the present location of Manti, Utah in November, and established a base camp for the winter, digging temporary shelters into the south side of the hill on which the LDS Church's Manti Utah Temple now stands. It was an isolated place, at least four days by wagon from the nearest Mormon settlement. Relations between the Mormon settlers and the local Ute Indians were helpful and cooperative. Morley and his settlers felt that part of their purpose was to bring the gospel to the Indians. Morley wrote, "Did we come here to enrich ourselves in the things of this world? No. We were sent to enrich the Natives and comfort the hearts of the long oppressed."

During the severe winter, a measles epidemic broke out. The Mormons used their limited medicine to nurse the Indians, and likewise when Mormon supplies ran low, the Ute shared their food supply. In 1850, Walkara agreed to be baptized into the LDS Church with his son. Walkara regularly traded women and children as slaves in order to trade for horses, guns, and ammunition. Mormon settlers tried to stop this practice, but their efforts only angered the tribe for interfering with their Indian slave trade. Relations with the Mormon settlers deteriorated rapidly. Walkara's raiding lifestyle was under pressure from an increasing number of federal troops in the Great Basin and Southwest and from the expansion of Latter-day Saint settlements. One conjecture holds that Mormon settlers also strongly objected to the profitable traditional trade in native slaves and interfered in many transactions. This is contradictory to the fact that Young was not, by his own account, an abolitionist. In addition, increasing numbers of non-Mormon trading expeditions and settlers were traveling through Central and Southern Utah, adding to the competition for water and resources. Some isolated natives were killed, and Walkara and other leaders became increasingly angry with both the Mormonees and the Mericats, designations used by local tribes to distinguish Mormon settlers from non-Mormon Americans.

== Walker War ==
Growing tension between the Mormon settlers and the Ute Indians resulted in the Walker War. The war was sparked on July 17, 1853, by a confrontation with James Alexander Ivie in Springville in Utah Valley. It resulted in the death of a band member, Shower-O-Cats, a relative of Walkara. The Indians wanted to trade goods near Ivie's home, when Ivie tried to intervene in an argument over a trade between a Ute and his wife. Ivie wounded several of the Indians and one died. When Ivie would not comply with Indian requests for compensation, believing that he acted in self-defense, tension between Mormon settlers and the Ute reached its peak.

A militia unit went to Walkara's camp in Payson to work out a peaceful resolution; however, no arrangement was agreed upon. The Utes demanded retribution, seeking the death of a Euro-American. When the Mormons refused, the Ute shot and killed Alexander Keele on July 18, 1853, in Payson. This event was the tipping point in the relations between the two groups. Indians started attacks in nearby towns. By July 25, Walkara was reported to be gathering Ute for a war. Mormon colonels Peter Conover and Stephen Markham rounded up men and called for volunteers to pursue the Ute, and families were advised to fortify their houses, store their grains, and protect their livestock. In a defensive effort, Brigham Young directed settlers to move from outlying farms and ranches and establish centralized forts. His people began to heavily guard the travel routes between Mormon settlements.

Walkara and his warriors conducted raids against Mormon outposts in central and southern Utah; in turn pioneer militias retaliated. In one case, four settlers driving oxen-drawn wagons to Salt Lake City from Manti were attacked and killed at Uintah Springs on the night of September 30, 1853. Historical accounts indicate that pioneers retaliated the next day, and intermittent fighting continued until early November. In December of that year, Young offered amnesty to all the Ute. They did not respond and continued to commit violent acts for several more weeks. On March 24, Young sent Major E.A. Bedell, the federal Indian agent, to meet with Walkara and other Ute leaders. Bedell was to inquire if they would make a treaty with Young for the sale of their land. During the meeting with Bedell, Walkara said that "he would prefer not to sell if he could live peacefully with the white people which he was anxious to do."

The Walker War ended through this understanding personally negotiated between Young and Walkara that was finalized in May 1854 in Levan, near Nephi, Utah. In his contemporary work Incidents of Travel and Adventure in the Far West (1857), photographer and artist Solomon N. Carvalho gives an account of the peace council held between Walkara, other native leaders in central Utah, and Brigham Young. Carvalho took the opportunity to persuade the Indian leader to pose for a portrait, now held by the Thomas Gilcrease Institute, Tulsa, Oklahoma. Although immediate hostilities ended, none of the underlying conflicts were resolved.

Walkara died of "lung fever" on 29 January 1855 at Meadow Creek, Utah. At his funeral, fifteen horses, two wives, and two children were killed and buried along with him. However, tensions remained; together with some who refused to accept the peace, another incident precipitated the longer and more costly Ute Black Hawk War a decade later.

In all, casualties during the war totaled twelve white settlers and an equally modest number of Indians. In addition, U.S. surveyor John Williams Gunnison and seven members of his party were attacked and killed, apparently by local tribesmen, along the lower Sevier River in 1853. An archaeological dig in 2007 examined seven bodies of Native American men and boys found in a relatively shallow grave near Nephi. Wounds on some of the remains suggest these Native Americans were executed rather than killed in combat. One skeleton appeared to have been bound by a leather strap at the time of his death. The bodies probably belonged to members of a Utah or Goshute tribe. A rock monument was built in Memorial Park in Payson to commemorate the death of a settler during the war. Another was built in Spanish Fork, Utah at the site of the Old Palmyra Fort.

=== Tribe joining the LDS Church by baptism ===
After the Walker War had ended, on July 27, 1854, under the direction of stake president Welcome Chapman, 120 members (103 males, 17 females) of Walkara's tribe were baptized as members of the LDS Church in Manti's City Creek. Walkara was possibly re-baptized at this time. After his baptism, he was renamed Joseph Walker.

== Slavery ==
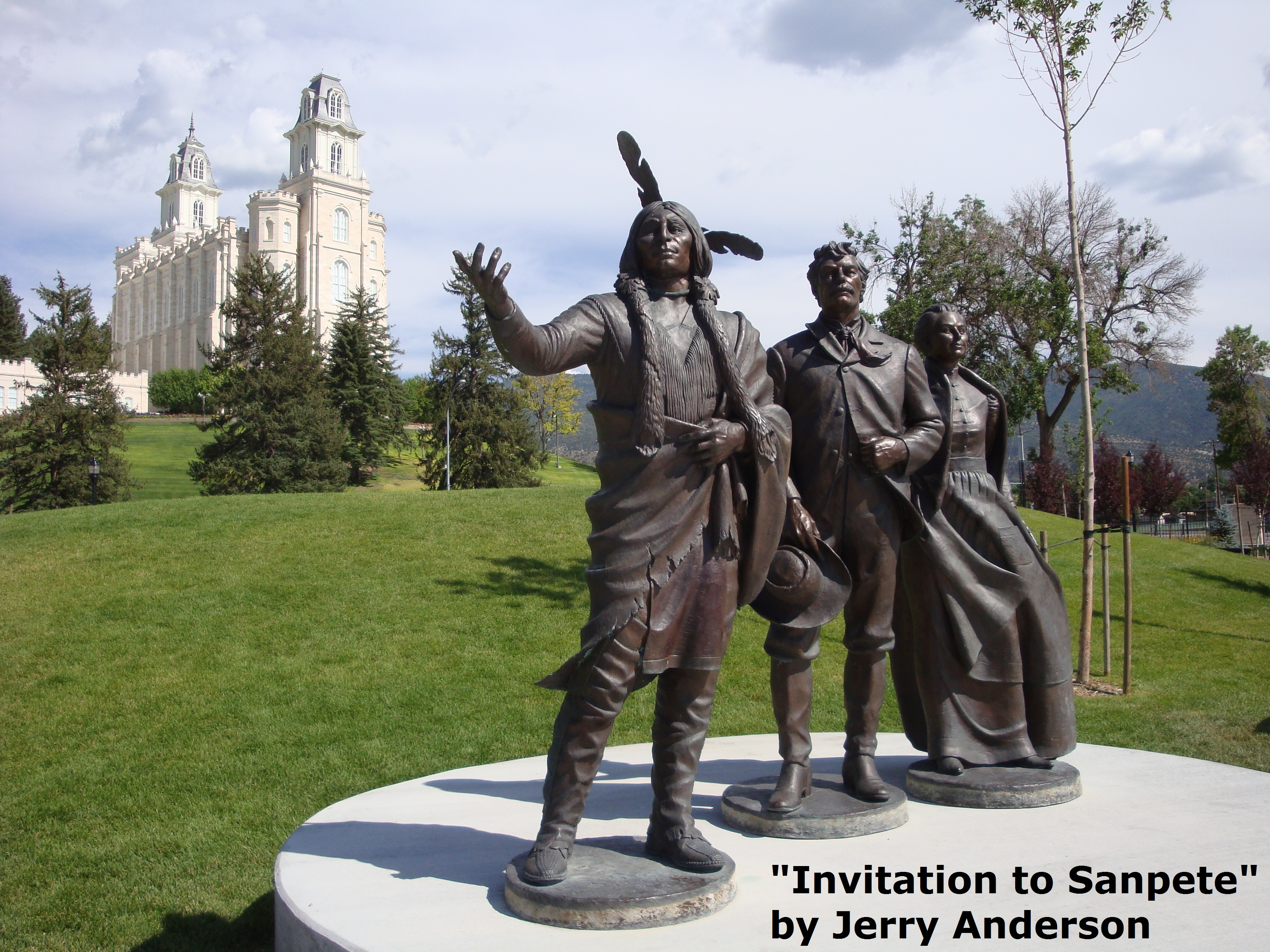
Statue titled "Invitation to Sanpete" with unnamed Indian, memorializing Walkara's decision to allow White settlers to the area. Located in front of the Manti Utah Temple.

There is controversy over whether Chief Walkara was involved in slavery and human sacrifice. His descendants report that such activities were never cultural with them and would have been considered dishonorable. Walkara supposedly was involved with the slave trade in the Great Basin. The custom of the Ute tribes allowed for them to sell women and children in exchange for supplies and horses, which they ate. Some children were acquired for trading through war raids and then were sold to Mexican traders who sold them as slaves in California or Mexico. A boy could typically be sold for $100, and girls were for $150 to $200.

At first, church leaders encouraged Walkara's slave trade. Apostle George A. Smith gave him talking papers that certified "it is my desire that they [Captain Walker and Peteetneet] should be treated as friends, and as they wish to Trade horses, Buckskins and Piede children, we hope them success and prosperity and good bargains." Brigham Young encouraged the saints to "buy up the Lamanite children as fast as they could," for the purpose of educating them and converting them to the Mormon faith.

In 1906, Susa Young Gates accused Walkara of kidnapping Brigham Young's daughter, Sally Young Kanosh. However, there is little evidence that it occurred.

== Child sacrifice ==
Walkara was said to have been involved in human sacrifice. The Ute had a practice of burying children alive to serve as servants to the recently deceased and be their companion in the next life. Walkara may have had two captive children killed to relieve his own pain. When the Walker War ended, Walkara's daughter was sick; he said that if his child died, an Indian woman must be sacrificed so that his daughter's spirit did not travel alone in the spirit world. Upon Walkara's death, two Indian women, three deceased children, twenty horses, and one live boy were buried as formal sacrifices with him.

== Death ==
Walkara died after a lingering illness, possibly pneumonia, on January 28, 1855, while at Meadow Creek, Utah Territory. As Chief of the Timpanogos Utes, he reportedly had a rather elaborate burial and was entombed in a small canyon in the mountains, along with animal and human sacrifices. This burial scene involved carrying his corpse to the rocky entombment site by binding his corpse so that it sat upright on a horse. Walkara's weapons and ammunition were laid beside him and his personal horses were killed to accompany him on his journey to the next life. He had a letter from Brigham Young in his hand. A live boy and girl were placed on top of the burial pit in order to watch over his grave until they joined Walkara in the afterlife. The boy broke free and cried for help. Although nearby settlers heard him, gunfire from the Indian tribe warned them not to interfere.

Isaac Morley, his long time friend, had promised Walkara that he would speak at the entombment. Morley later described the terrible ordeal and reported that he dare not object to the ceremony for fear of causing an uprising in the already delicate relationship between Walkara's brothers and the white settlers.

== Sources ==
- Mueller, Max Perry (2025). Wakara's America: The Life and Legacy of a Native Founder of the American West. Basic Books. ISBN 978-1541602595.
- Mueller, Max Perry. (2017). Race and the Making of the Mormon People (Chapel Hill, University of North Carolina Press, ISBN 978-1-4696-3616-0).
- Kelley, Tina; MacKay, Kathryn L. (1994), "Wakara", in Powell, Allan Kent (ed.), Utah History Encyclopedia, Salt Lake City, Utah: University of Utah Press, ISBN 0874804256, OCLC 30473917
- Larson, Gustive O. (Summer 1952), "Wakara's Half Century", Western Humanities Review, 6, University of Utah, OCLC 504276343
- Sonne, Conway B. (1962), World of Wakara, San Antonio: Naylor Company, OCLC 2823188
