= Carl Albrecht (politician) =

American politician (born 1952)

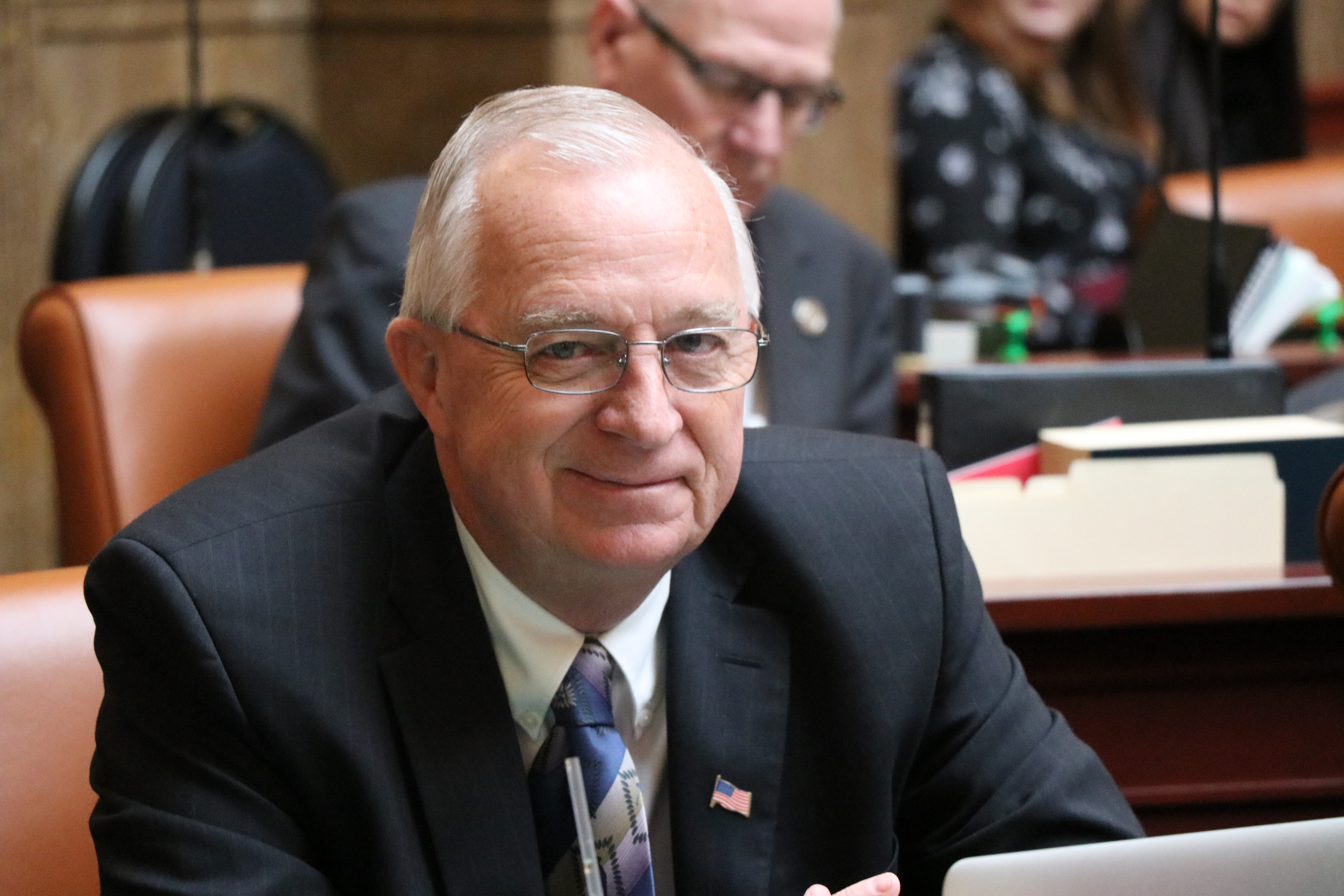
- A photo of Carl Albrecht of the Utah House of Representatives

Member of the Utah House of Representatives from the 70th district
- Incumbent
- Assumed office January 1, 2017
- Preceded by: Kay McIff

Personal details
- Born: April 9, 1952 (age 74)
- Party: Republican

Carl Albrecht (born April 9, 1952) is an American politician who has served in the Utah House of Representatives from the 70th district since 2017.

== Early life and career ==
Carl Albrecht grew up in Salina, Utah. He graduated from Wayne High School and holds a bachelor's degree in business administration from Southern Utah State College.

Albrecht worked for Garkane Energy Cooperative for 40 years, serving as the company's chief operating officer for 22 years. He retired from the company on April 30, 2014.

In 1990, Albrecht joined the Sevier School District Board of Education.

Albrecht has served as a Richfield City Council member, was chairman of the Planning and Zoning Commission, worked on the Richfield Independence Day Committee, was captain of the Sevier County Jeep Posse and was a member of the Richfield Area Chamber of Commerce.

== Political career ==
In 2017, Albrecht won the 70th District Utah House race with 78% of the votes.

In 2018, Albrecht sponsored and helped pass HB390, a bill that created state grants to increase the number of jobs in rural Utah. In February 2019, Albrecht sponsored legislation to increase the cap of the grants. In March 2019, Albrecht introduced HB296, a proposal that would incentivize the creation of co-working spaces in rural Utah.

In 2019, Carl Albrecht was awarded Legislator of the Year from the Salt Lake Chamber.

As of 2022, Albrecht serves on the Natural Resources, Agriculture, and Environmental Quality Appropriations Subcommittee; House Natural Resources, Agriculture, and Environment Committee; House Public Utilities, Energy, and Technology Committee; Federalism Commission; and Legislative Water Development Commission.

=== Political positions ===
Albrecht has stated he believes climate change exists but he's unsure if it was directly caused by humans. He has also stated that he is a strong proponent of the 2nd Amendment.

== 2022 sponsored legislation ==
Bill	Status
HB 46- Utah Energy Infrastructure Amendments	House/ to Governor 3/10/22
HB 101- Rural Coworking and Innovation Center Grant Program Amendments	House/ to Governor 3/10/22
HB 125- State Transient Room Tax Modifications	House/ to Governor 3/10/22
HB 168- Preferences of Water Rights Amendments	House/ to Governor 3/10/22
HB 180- Off-road Vehicle Safety Education	House/ to Governor 3/14/22
HB 215- Project Entity Oversight Committee	House/ to Governor 3/10/22
HB 418- Grid Resilience Committee	House/ enrolled bill to Printing 3/4/22

== Personal life ==
Carl is married to Gail Albrecht, a former assistant school superintendent. Together they have three children and nine grandchildren.
