= Fountain Green, Utah =

City in Utah, United States

- City
- Location in Sanpete County and the state of Utah.
- Coordinates: 39°37′40″N 111°38′22″W
- Country: United States
- State: Utah
- County: Sanpete
- Settled: March 1859
- Named for: Springs and meadows

Area
  - Total: 1.25 sq mi (3.24 km^{2})
  - Land: 1.25 sq mi (3.24 km^{2})
  - Water: 0 sq mi (0.00 km^{2})
- Elevation: 5,899 ft (1,798 m)

Population (2020)
  - Total: 1,197
  - Density: 956.8/sq mi (369.44/km^{2})
- Time zone: UTC-7 (Mountain (MST))
  - Summer (DST): UTC-6 (MDT)
- ZIP code: 84632
- Area code: 435
- FIPS code: 49-26720
- GNIS feature ID: 1441187
- Website: www.fountaingreencity.gov

Fountain Green is a city in Sanpete County, Utah, United States. The population was 1,197 at the 2020 census.

== History ==
Fountain Green was originally called "Uintah Springs", and under the latter name settlement was made in 1859. A post office called Fountain Green has been in operation since 1860. The present name is for springs and green pastures near the original town site.

== Geography ==
According to the United States Census Bureau, the city has a total area of 1.4 square miles (3.6 km^{2}), all land.

Historical population
Census	Pop.	Note	%±
1870	562		—
1880	881		56.8%
1890	677		−23.2%
1900	755		11.5%
1910	875		15.9%
1920	1,169		33.6%
1930	982		−16.0%
1940	988		0.6%
1950	767		−22.4%
1960	544		−29.1%
1970	467		−14.2%
1980	578		23.8%
1990	578		0.0%
2000	945		63.5%
2010	1,071		13.3%
2020	1,197		11.8%
U.S. Decennial Census

== Demographics ==
=== 2020 census ===
As of the 2020 census, Fountain Green had a population of 1,197. The median age was 34.9 years, with 31.2% of residents under the age of 18 and 16.7% aged 65 years or older. For every 100 females there were 97.5 males, and for every 100 females age 18 and over there were 107.3 males age 18 and over.

0.0% of residents lived in urban areas, while 100.0% lived in rural areas.

There were 365 households in Fountain Green, of which 38.9% had children under the age of 18 living in them. Of all households, 71.5% were married-couple households, 11.5% were households with a male householder and no spouse or partner present, and 14.0% were households with a female householder and no spouse or partner present. About 14.8% of all households were made up of individuals and 8.8% had someone living alone who was 65 years of age or older.

There were 385 housing units, of which 5.2% were vacant. The homeowner vacancy rate was 0.0% and the rental vacancy rate was 0.0%.

Racial composition as of the 2020 census
Race	Number	Percent
White	1,091	91.1%
Black or African American	0	0.0%
American Indian and Alaska Native	6	0.5%
Asian	0	0.0%
Native Hawaiian and Other Pacific Islander	3	0.3%
Some other race	35	2.9%
Two or more races	62	5.2%
Hispanic or Latino (of any race)	76	6.3%

=== 2010 census ===
As of the 2010 census, there were 1,071 people and 370 households, 88.4% of which were occupied housing units. The population density was 705 people per square mile. The racial makeup of the city was 89.07% White, 0.10% African American, 0.60% Native American, and 1.73% from other races. Hispanic or Latino of any race were 8.50% of the population.

== Education ==
Fountain Green is located in the North Sanpete School District and contains an elementary school. Students attend North Sanpete Middle School in Moroni and North Sanpete High School in Mount Pleasant.

== Events ==
The annual city celebration is Lamb Day each July, in recognition of the local sheep ranching industry. The event includes a play, mutton busting, carnival, softball games, a fun run, large number of lambs cooked in an open pit, and a parade down State Street.

== See also ==
- List of cities and towns in Utah
- Fountain Green Massacre
