= Welcome Chapman =

American Mormon leader

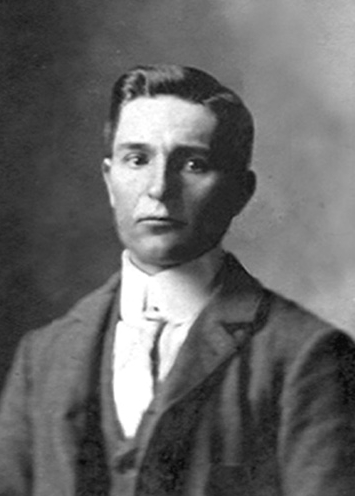
- Born: July 24, 1805; Readsboro, Vermont
- Died: December 9, 1893 (aged 88); Fountain Green, Utah
- Known for: Leader of Sanpete Mormon Colony; 1854–1862
- Spouses: Susan Amelia Risley; Ann Mackey; Catherine Ann Stayner
- Parents: Benjamin Chapman; Sibyl Amidon

Welcome Chapman (July 24, 1805 – December 9, 1893) was an early leader in the Church of Jesus Christ of Latter-day Saints born in Readsboro, Vermont. Chapman was the leader of the Latter-day Saint settlers in Manti, Utah, from 1854 to 1862, and helped broker peace between the settlers and Chief Wakara's tribe.

== Childhood ==
Chapman was born in 1805 in Readsboro, Vermont, four miles down the river from fellow leader of The Church of Jesus Christ of Latter-day Saints leader Brigham Young. He apprenticed as a stonemason in his early teens, but because his parents deemed him "sickly," they found him a position as cook on a fishing boat. He worked both in the North Atlantic and on Lake Champlain. The time at sea reportedly improved his health.

== Marriage and conversion ==
In between fishing expeditions he met Susan Amelia Risley (1807–1888), daughter of a prominent Madison County, New York couple. They disapproved of the relationship because they believed his occupation was too unstable to support a family. In response, Chapman abandoned fishing and took steps toward returning to stone cutting. The Risleys relented, and Chapman married Amelia in about 1831.

The Chapmans made their home in a hamlet known as Hubbardsville in Madison County, where they had four children, all daughters. The first two were twins who died in infancy.

While in Hubbardsville, they joined the Church of Jesus Christ of Latter-day Saints. First Welcome joined, to which Amelia reacted harshly, declaring "You have went and joined those awful Mormons." However, she joined the church about six months later.

Because they joined an unpopular religion, their friends and neighbors shunned them and appeared to look down on them, the prominence of Amelia's parents notwithstanding.

The Risleys were broken-hearted over their daughter joining the Latter-day Saints, but they did not turn bitter. However, Welcome's parents disowned him. The Chapmans soon moved to a Latter Day Saint community, possibly Kirtland, Ohio, but more likely Jackson County and then Far West, Missouri.

Armed mobs drove the Chapmans from their homes in Missouri and Illinois. They built a home in Far West, Missouri, in 1838, only to be forced from the state by order of the governor that Fall. Amelia was six months' pregnant when a mob gave the Chapmans and their Latter-day Saint neighbors a few hours to clear out before their homes would be burned. They remained in the area long enough for Amelia to carry the baby, a son, to full term. He was born two weeks after the Hawn's Mill Massacre. They soon fled to Illinois, where they built a home in Nauvoo along the banks of the Mississippi River and Chapman cut stone for the Nauvoo Temple. While in Nauvoo, Amelia had three more children, all sons, one of whom died at three months.

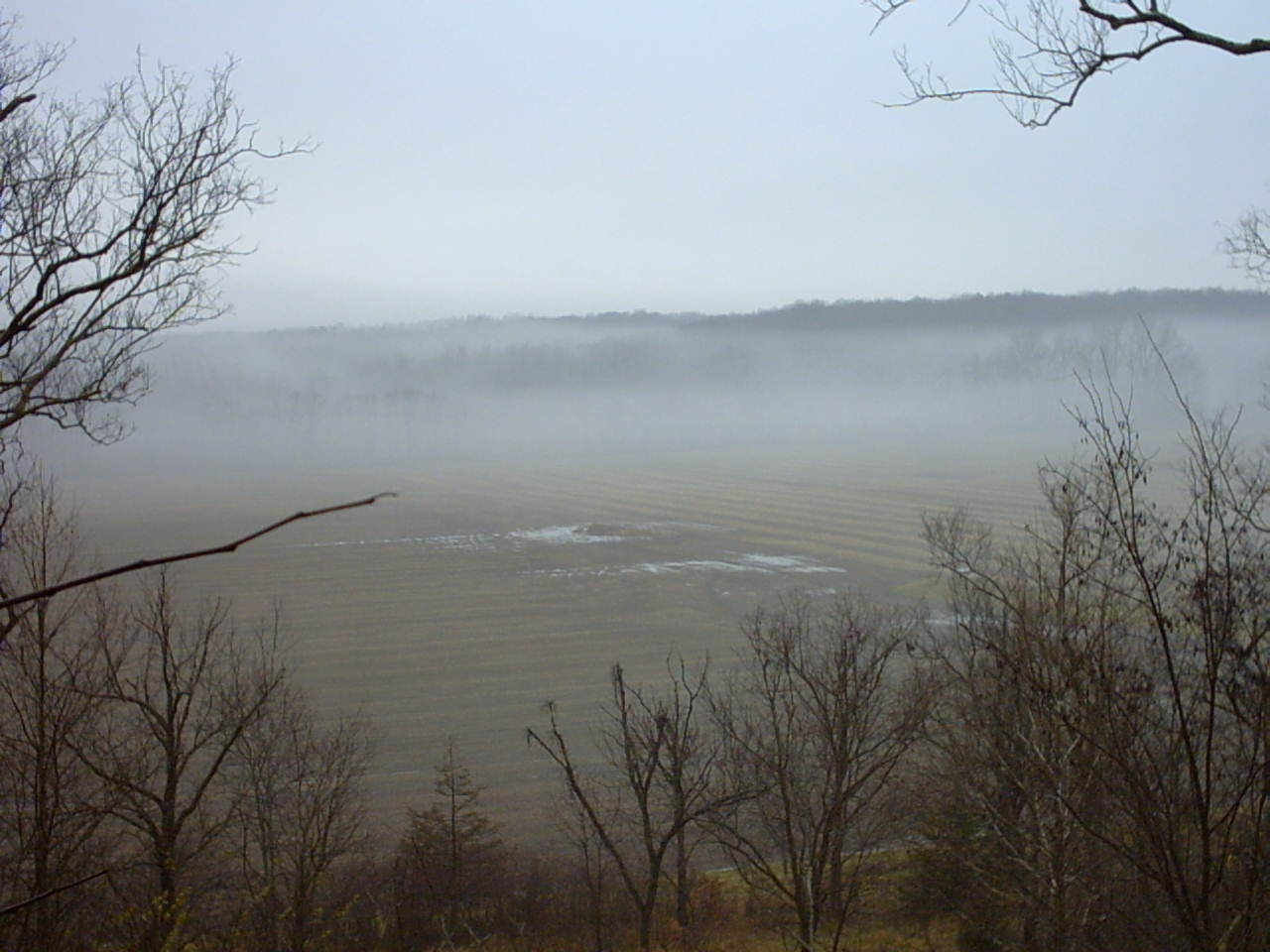
Scene near Far West, Missouri

Chapman was part of the Maid of Iowa expedition sent in support of Joseph Smith when an armed company of men from Missouri were sent to kidnap him.

Mobs drove them from Nauvoo in 1846, when they fled with most other Nauvoo residents across the river to Iowa, and then on to what later became known as Winter Quarters, an unsettled area along the Missouri River in present-day eastern Nebraska. There, Amelia gave birth to another daughter in October 1846. Two months earlier, Brigham Young divided the Winter Quarters settlement into two "grand divisions" presided over by himself and Heber C. Kimball, respectively. Each division had two subdivisions presided over by a foreman. Chapman was foreman of the fourth subdivision, with Hosea Stout serving as its clerk. In the summer of 1848, the Chapmans crossed the plains with their six surviving children to what later became Utah Territory.

== Settling Utah ==
The Chapmans had their final child, a son named Welcome Chapman, Jr., in the Salt Lake Valley in Fall 1849. About the same time, Brigham Young asked Chapman to help colonize the Sanpitch (now Sanpete) Valley with Isaac Morley. They arrived in November 1849 and endured a harsh winter with little shelter. Chapman was part of the first militia of Manti and used his stone cutting skills to help construct the first fort. He was also among the first group of selectmen. The young colony experienced great difficulties, but gradually began to prosper.

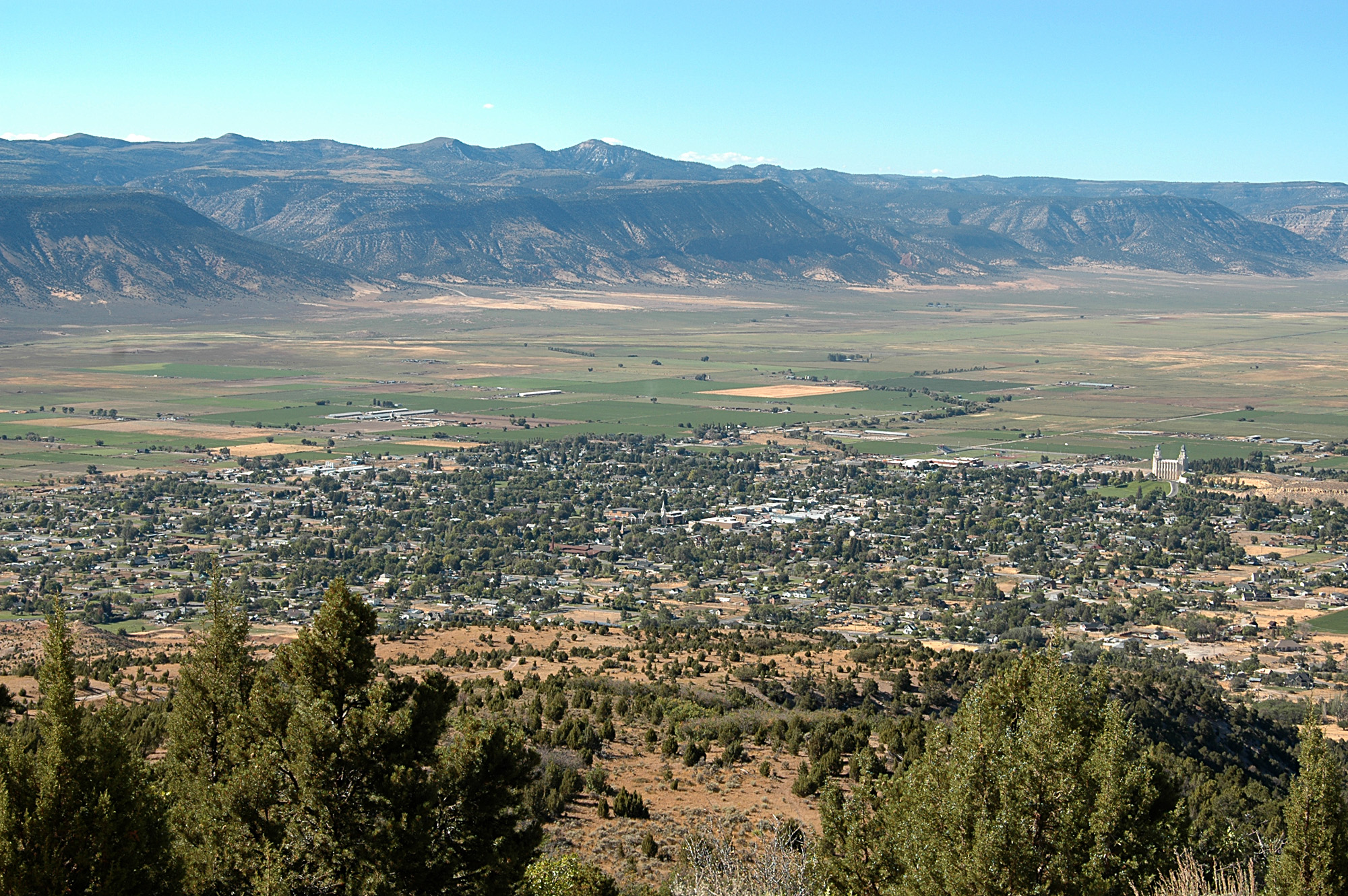
View of the Sanpete Valley

On April 30, 1851, Brigham Young called Chapman to be part of the first High Council of the Manti Area Branch in Manti, Utah. On July 8, 1854, the High Council installed Chapman as the colony leader, replacing Isaac Morley, who had been "called to Salt Lake." The next day, the settlers unanimously approved him as their leader. Later that month, on July 27, a stake was organized and Chapman was chosen as its president. That same day Walkara joined the Church of Jesus Christ of Latter-day Saints by baptism (or rebaptized) in Manti's City Creek, along with 120 other members of his tribe (103 males, 17 females).

Amelia was born into a family of seven girls and five boys on a flax farm in upstate New York. Her mother taught the girls reading and mathematics, as well as how to cord, spin and weave wool and linen. When the Chapmans first arrived in the Salt Lake Valley, Amelia turned most of the housework over to her 12- and 14-year-old daughters while she focused on weaving linsey-woolsey cloth, which the young community badly needed. Contemporary accounts consider Amelia an excellent cook and housekeeper and an authority on herbal medicine. She served as a practical doctor and nurse to "neighbors for many miles around" and as a midwife. She assisted in the births of some of her grandchildren and great-grandchildren. She was more educated than her husband, which helped him during his active public life. After the Chapmans relocated to Manti, Brigham Young and other authorities from Salt Lake made the Chapman home, which was better furnished than most neighbors, their headquarters when visiting Sanpete.

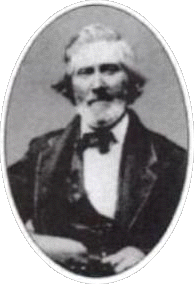
Chapman in his later years

After Wakara died in 1855, his brother, Arapeen, succeeded him as war chief. Although the brief Wakara War was over, tensions between the Latter-day Saints and the Ute Indians in Sanpete still existed. In early 1857 Arapeen reported having a vision in which Wakara came to him with a message of peace. In the vision Wakara specifically instructed him to pass this message on to Chapman and two others. B.H. Roberts believed it was the peace that ensued that enabled Arapeen to accompany Brigham Young on an expedition to present-day Idaho, where Young made peace with the Bannocks.

In Manti, Chapman practiced plural marriage. He married Ann Mackey on October 5, 1855, and Catherine Stainer on March 5, 1856. He had a large family with each of these women, in addition to the family he had with Amelia. (He also possibly married two women who left him shortly thereafter.) Chapman was a founding owner of the San Pete Coal Company, incorporated by act of the Territorial Legislature on January 8, 1856.

After serving as the leader in Manti for eight years, Brigham Young called him to Salt Lake City to cut stone for the Salt Lake Temple, where Chapman often worked with a son at his side. At one point he worked alongside seven of them. He helped build the temple, "from the bottom to the top," through at least 1880, including during times the church could not pay. He earned supplemental income in Salt Lake City by cutting and hauling wood to Fort Douglas, where he sold it to the soldiers.

In either late November or early December 1893, at the age of 88, Chapman reportedly rode a horse bareback for three miles to build a chimney on the house of his third wife, Catherine. Chilled through after building the chimney and riding home again through the cold, he developed pneumonia. He died soon after in Fountain Green, Utah on December 9, 1893, and was buried in Manti.

== Other sources ==
- Media related to Welcome Chapman at Wikimedia Commons
- Stubbs, Glen R. History of construction of the Manti Temple, 8
- Early Latter-day Saints project at http://earlylds.com/getperson.php?personID=I5644&tree=Earlylds
