= Wales, Utah =

Town in Sanpete County, Utah, United States

- Town
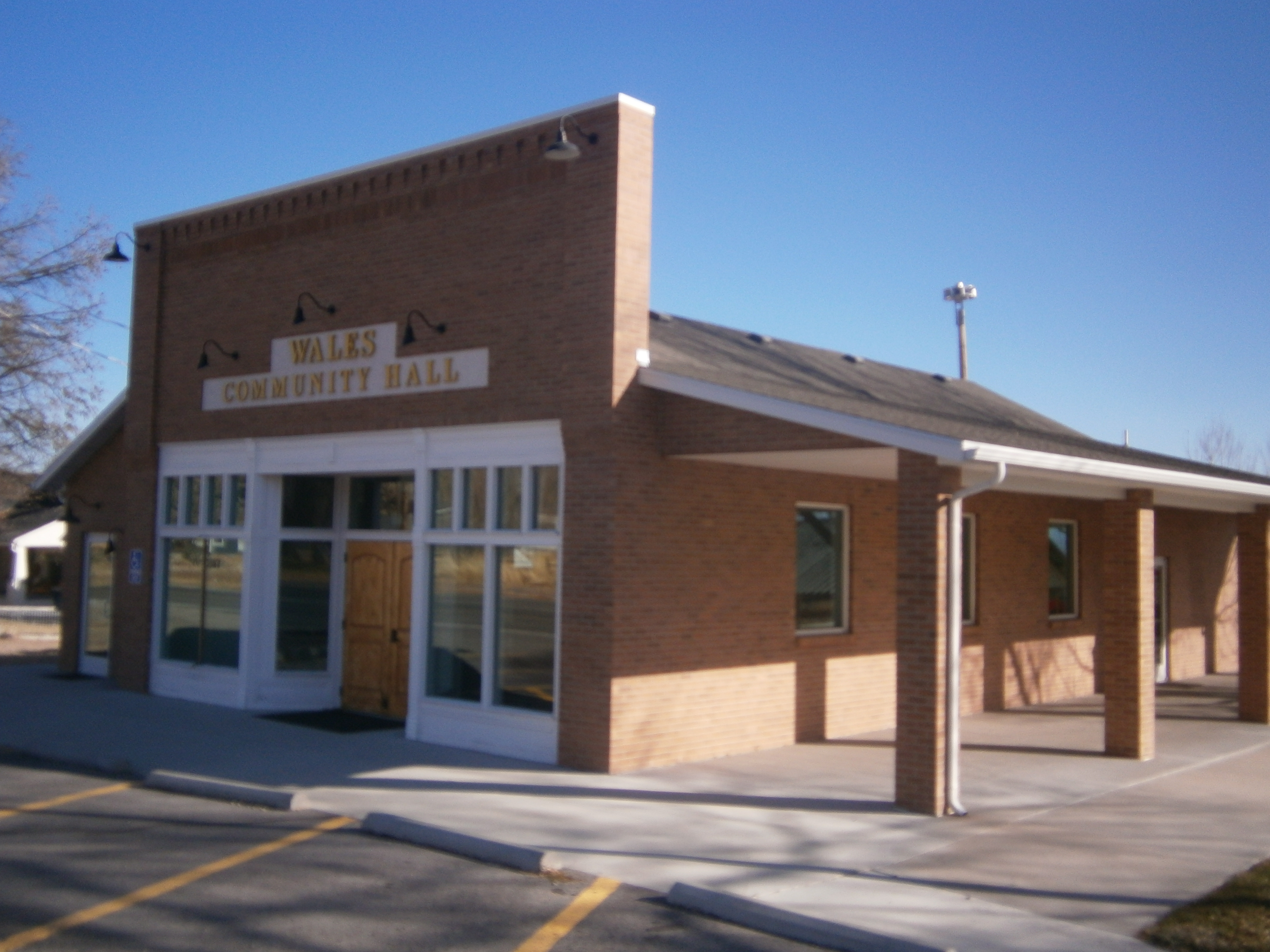
- Wales Community Hall, November 2019

- Location in Sanpete County and the state of Utah.
- Coordinates: 39°29′10″N 111°38′10″W
- Country: United States
- State: Utah
- County: Sanpete
- Founded: 1859
- Named for: Wales, the ancestral land of a large share of the early settlers

Area
  - Total: 0.40 sq mi (1.03 km^{2})
  - Land: 0.40 sq mi (1.03 km^{2})
  - Water: 0 sq mi (0.00 km^{2})
- Elevation: 5,627 ft (1,715 m)

Population (2020)
  - Total: 338
  - Density: 849.9/sq mi (328.16/km^{2})
- Time zone: UTC-7 (Mountain (MST))
  - Summer (DST): UTC-6 (MDT)
- ZIP code: 84667
- Area code: 435
- FIPS code: 49-80860
- GNIS feature ID: 1446954
- Website: walesutah.gov

Wales is a town in Sanpete County, Utah, United States. The population was 338 at the 2020 census. The town is governed by a mayor and several council members. As of December 2008, Wales had no stores, gas stations, or stoplights. It does have a park, fire station, library and cemetery.

== Description ==
The small mining town of Wales was named for the country of the immigrants sent there by Brigham Young in 1854 to mine the "rock that burns". A Native American named Tabiona, a prominent Ute, had shown Young, then president of The Church of Jesus Christ of Latter-day Saints, a small sample. Young recognized it as coal and asked if his group knew how to mine it. Some Welsh immigrants, including John Evans Rees and his cousin John Price, who had experience with coal mining in the U.K., volunteered and were sent to the west side hills to set up mines.

The community's original name was Coal Bed, but was changed to Wales in 1857. There once was a railroad depot, an essential and busy mining center. The mines and trains were abandoned when more productive mines were discovered in Scofield. Many of the present residents are descendants of the original miners.

Wales lies on the west side of the Sanpete Valley, at the foot of the San Pitch Mountains.

== Geography ==
According to the United States Census Bureau, the town has a total area of 0.3 square mile (0.8 km^{2}), all land.

== Demographics ==
Historical population
Census	Pop.	Note	%±
1870	83		—
1880	306		268.7%
1890	233		−23.9%
1900	331		42.1%
1910	294		−11.2%
1920	280		−4.8%
1930	243		−13.2%
1940	223		−8.2%
1950	179		−19.7%
1960	130		−27.4%
1970	89		−31.5%
1980	153		71.9%
1990	189		23.5%
2000	219		15.9%
2010	302		37.9%
2020	338		11.9%
U.S. Decennial Census

As of the census of 2000, 219 people, 64 households, and 54 families residing in the town. The population density was 731.4 people per square mile (281.9/km2). There were 84 housing units at an average density of 280.5 per square mile (108.1/km2). The town's racial makeup was 97.26% White, 0.46% Pacific Islander, 1.83% from other races, and 0.46% from two or more races. Hispanic or Latino of any race were 7.31% of the population.

There were 64 households, out of which 43.8% had children under 18 living with them, 78.1% were married couples living together, 6.3% had a female householder with no husband present, and 14.1% were non-families. 12.5% of all households comprised individuals, and 6.3% had someone who was 65 or older living alone. The average household size was 3.42, and the average family size was 3.73.

The town's population was spread out, with 34.2% under 18, 12.8% from 18 to 24, 21.9% from 25 to 44, 18.3% from 45 to 64, and 12.8% who were 65 years of age or older. The median age was 26 years. For every 100 females, there were 110.6 males. For every 100 females age 18 and over, there were 111.8 males.

The median income for a household in the town was $35,313, and the median income for a family was $38,750. Males had a median income of $28,125 versus $16,250 for females. The per capita income for the town was $9,885. About 3.7% of families and 6.0% of the population were below the poverty line, including 8.8% of those under eighteen and 19.0% of those 65 or over.

== Education ==
It is in the North Sanpete School District. The district operates North Sanpete High School.

== See also ==
- List of municipalities in Utah
