= Kay McIff =

American politician (1939–2020)

Member of the Utah House of Representatives from the 70th district
- In office January 1, 2007 – January 1, 2017
- Preceded by: Brad Johnson
- Succeeded by: Carl Albrecht

Personal details
- Born: September 21, 1939 Sterling, Utah
- Died: September 16, 2020 (aged 80) Richfield, Utah
- Party: Republican
- Education: Utah State University; S.J. Quinney College of Law
- Profession: Attorney

Kay L. Mciff was an American politician and a former Republican member of the Utah House of Representatives who represented District 70 from 2007 to 2017.

== Early life and career ==
McIff grew up in central Utah and graduated from Manti High School. He went on to serve in the United States Army, and attended Snow College. McIff earned his BS from Utah State University where he served as student body vice president. He went on to attend the University of Utah's S.J. Quinney College of Law and earned his JD. While in law school he met Renee Stephenson, whom he later married.

McIff had five children and lived in Richfield, Utah with his wife, Renee until she died in 2018. He worked as an attorney at the McIff Firm.

== Political career ==
- 2006 When District 75 incumbent Republican Representative Brad Johnson retired and left the seat open, McIff won the 2006 Republican Primary with 2,662 votes (53.9%) and was unopposed for the November 7, 2006 General election.
- 2008 McIff was unopposed for the June 24, 2008 Republican Primary and won the November 4, 2008 General election with 9,169 votes (77.3%) against Constitution candidate Bevan Bastian.
- 2010 McIff was unopposed for the June 22, 2010 Republican Primary, and won the November 2, 2010 General election with 7,818 votes (72.9%) against Constitution candidate L. S. Brown.
- 2012 McIff was challenged but chosen by the Republican convention for the three-way November 6, 2012 General election, winning with 10,332 votes (73.5%) against Democratic nominee Wayne Hoskisson and returning 2010 Constitution candidate L. S. Brown.
- 2014 Mciff was unopposed for the Republican convention and won the three-way November 4, 2014 General election with 5,955 votes (63.9%) against Democratic nominee Kalen Jones and Constitution nominee R. Glenn Stoneman.

During the 2016 legislative session, Representative Mciff served on the Higher Education Appropriations Subcommittee, the House Law Enforcement and Criminal Justice Committee, and the House Health and Human Services Committee. During the interim, Mciff served on the Health and Human Services Interim Committee and the Law Enforcement and Criminal Justice Interim Committee. He also served on the Native American Legislative Liaison Committee and the State Water Development Commission.

== 2016 Sponsored Legislation ==
Bill number	Bill name	Bill status
HB0015	Domestic Relations Retirement Shares	Governor Signed - 3/21/2016
HB0079S01	Nonpatient Cause of Action	Governor Signed - 3/25/2016
HB0217	Small School Funding	Governor Signed - 3/22/2016
HB0218	Utah Revised Nonprofit Corporation Act	House/ filed - 3/10/2016
HB0315	Bee Keeping Amendments	House/ filed - 3/10/2016

McIff also floor sponsored SB0021S01 Repeal of Health and Human Services Reports and Programs, SB0050S01 Health Code Repealer, SB0205 Ethics Revisions, SB0213S02 Small Claims Court Amendments, SB0219 Fair Housing Act Amendments, SB0229 Unlawful Detainer Amendments, SCR004 Concurrent Resolution - Old Spanish Trail Designation, SCR010 Communications Spectrum Translator System Concurrent Resolution, and SCR014 Concurrent Resolution Designating Utah Broadcasters Awareness Week.
