= North Sanpete School District =

School district in Sanpete County, Utah, United States

North Sanpete School District is a public school district in the U.S. state of Utah. The district provides education for students in the northern half of Sanpete County. The offices for the district are located in Mount Pleasant. There are five elementary schools, one middle school, one high school and one alternative school within the district. Enrollment in 2004 was 2,376 students.

Communities in the district include Mount Pleasant, Fairview, Fountain Green, Moroni, Spring City, and Wales.

== Schools in this district ==
School name	City/town	Grade level	# of students	Student/teacher ratio
Fairview Elementary	Fairview	K-6	272	20.9
Fountain Green Elementary	Fountain Green	K-6	155	22.5
Moroni Elementary	Moroni	K-6	258	19.1
Mount Pleasant Elementary	Mount Pleasant	K-6	409	21.0
North Sanpete High	Mount Pleasant	9-12	732	21.9
North Sanpete Middle	Moroni	7-8	390	19.5
Pine Creek Ranch (alternative school)	Mount Pleasant	8-12	16	16.0
Spring City Elementary	Spring City	K-6	144	20.6

== See also ==
- South Sanpete School District
