= Derek Wright =

American football player (born 1998)

Profile
- Position: Wide receiver

Personal information
- Born: August 13, 1998 (age 28); Sterling, Utah, U.S.
- Listed height: 6 ft 1 in (1.85 m)
- Listed weight: 195 lb (88 kg)

Career information
- High school: Manti High School (Utah)
- College: Snow College (2017-2018); Utah State (2019–2021)
- NFL draft: 2022: undrafted

Career history
- Carolina Panthers (2022–2023)
- Stats at Pro Football Reference

Derek Wright (born August 13, 1998) is an American football wide receiver. He played college football at Utah State.

== College career ==
After graduating High School, Wright attended Snow College for two seasons before attending Utah State. In his senior season at Utah State, he had 48 receptions for 789 yards and a team-best 11 touchdowns, earning himself honorable mention all-Mountain West Conference honors.

== Professional career ==
On May 1, 2022, Wright signed with the Carolina Panthers as an undrafted free agent.

On August 30, 2022, Wright was waived by the Panthers and re-signed to the practice squad. He signed a reserve/future deal with the Panthers on January 9, 2023.

On August 30, 2023, Wright was waived by the Panthers and re-signed to the practice squad. He was not signed to a reserve/future contract and thus became a free agent at the end of the season upon the expiration of his practice squad contract.
