= North Sanpete High School =

Location
- Mount Pleasant, Utah; United States
- 39°32′08″N 111°26′53″W

Information
- Type: Public
- Established: 1908
- Principal: Christine Straatman
- Teaching staff: 31.71 (FTE)
- Enrollment: 788 (2023-2024)
- Student to teacher ratio: 24.85
- Mascot: Hawk
- Colors: Red, white, and black
- Website: Official website

North Sanpete High School is a public high school serving grades 9 through 12 located in Mount Pleasant, Utah, United States. It is the only high school serving the North Sanpete School District.

Communities in the district include Mount Pleasant, Fairview, Fountain Green, Moroni, Spring City, and Wales.

== Notable alumni ==
- Vasco M. Tanner, entomologist
- Spencer Cox, Governor of Utah
- Junior Ioane, NFL football player
