= Mount Pleasant, Utah =

City in Utah, United States

- City
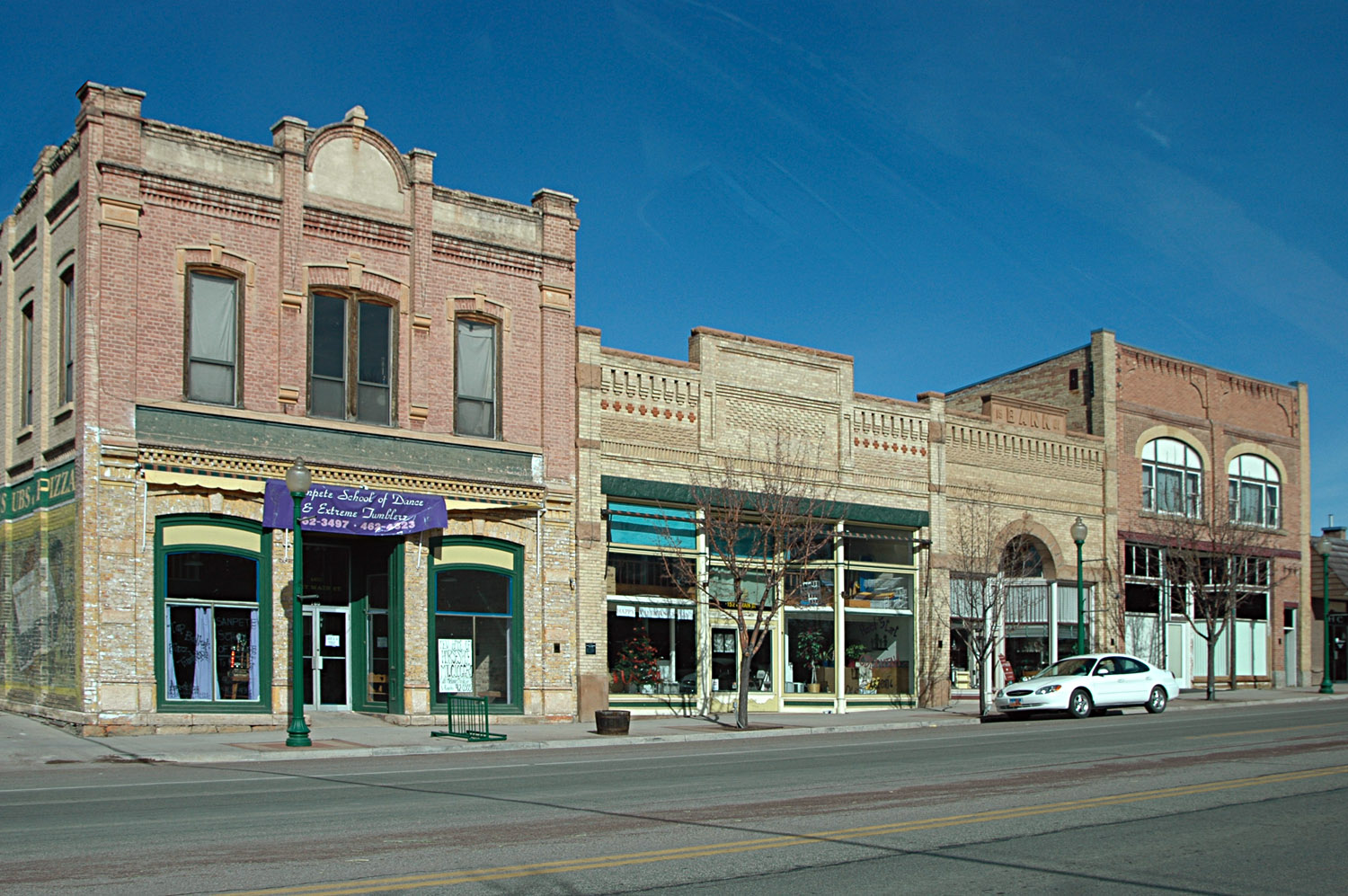
- Historic buildings on Mount Pleasant's Main Street

- Location in Sanpete County and the state of Utah.

- Location within Utah Location within the United States
- Coordinates: 39°32′35″N 111°27′23″W
- Country: United States
- State: Utah
- County: Sanpete
- Incorporated: 1868
- Founder: Madison Hambleton

Area
  - Total: 2.93 sq mi (7.59 km^{2})
  - Land: 2.93 sq mi (7.59 km^{2})
  - Water: 0 sq mi (0.00 km^{2})
- Elevation: 5,925 ft (1,806 m)

Population (2020)
  - Total: 3,655
  - Density: 1,204.6/sq mi (465.11/km^{2})
- Time zone: UTC-7 (Mountain (MST))
  - Summer (DST): UTC-6 (MDT)
- ZIP code: 84647
- Area code: 435
- FIPS code: 49-53010
- GNIS feature ID: 1430522
- Website: Mount Pleasant City Website

Mount Pleasant is a city in the U.S. state of Utah. Located in Sanpete County, Mt. Pleasant is known for being home to Wasatch Academy. As of the 2020 census, the city's population was 3,655.

== History ==
In the spring of 1852, Latter-Day Saint colonists from Manti led by Madison D. Hambleton established the Hambleton Settlement near the present site of Mt. Pleasant. During the Wakara War, the settlers relocated to Spring Town (Spring City), and later to Manti for protection. Local Native Americans destroyed the old settlement by setting it on fire. A large colonizing party from Ephraim and Manti returned to the area in 1859, and a permanent site was laid out in its present location.

Among the founding settlers were Latter-Day Saint converts from Scandinavia, the United Kingdom, and the eastern United States. By 1880, Mt. Pleasant was the county's largest city, with a population of 2,000. More than 72 percent of its married adults were foreign-born. This ethnic diversity had an important impact on village life during the nineteenth and early twentieth centuries. For decades, five languages were commonly spoken in the town.

The settlement and development of Mt. Pleasant followed the typical pattern for Latter-Day Saint towns of the period. A square-shaped town site was surveyed, lots were drawn, and the land was distributed among the population. Under the direction of James Russell Ivie (1802–1866), a fort of adobe walls and log cabins was built. Pleasant Creek ran through the fort, and farming was done outside of its walls. Ivie was killed in the Ute Black Hawk War by Indians who had declined to participate in the settlement of the earlier Wakara War. Around that time, the town acquired its present name. In 1872 the final peace treaty with the Indians was signed in Bishop Seeley's house on Main Street, bringing an end to this conflict. By this time, many settlers had erected homesteads outside of the fort. The town site may be expansive, but the population density remains relatively low, owing to the original layout that permitted only four lots per block.

Some of the first industries in Mt. Pleasant included tanning, shoe making, blacksmithing, basket making, and freighting. Eventual modernization brought such improvements as the Deseret Telegraph in 1869, the Pyramid Newspaper in 1890, and a telephone system in 1891.

Sawmills and flour mills were built, irrigation systems were dug, and a municipal government was created to oversee public laws and improvements. The city was incorporated in 1868, a year after the first cooperative store was founded. Upon the arrival of the Rio Grande Western Railway in 1890, both the local population and the city's prosperity increased dramatically. By 1900, Mt. Pleasant had grown to nearly 3,000 people, the largest size reached by any city in Sanpete County to that time, and the city had earned one of its nicknames, "Hub City".

The town's increased wealth resulted in the replacement of small, wood-frame commercial buildings with more durable stone and brick structures, such as the Sanpete County Co-op built in 1888. Additionally, the pioneer period's simpler adobe and log buildings were replaced with more elaborate Victorian-style churches, schools, and residences.

By 1912, the first high school, North Sanpete High School, had been completed. 1912 also brought the Armory Hall, while the Elite Theater was constructed as a "fireproof" building in 1913. It burned down seven decades later. In 1917, a Carnegie Library was built in a modern architectural style. The Marie Hotel was erected in 1920 and a large cheese factory was built in 1930, the same year that the bus service came to town. The completion of U.S. Highway 89 in 1936 softened the impact of the Great Depression. A city hall was built in 1939 and a hospital in 1945.

== Geography ==
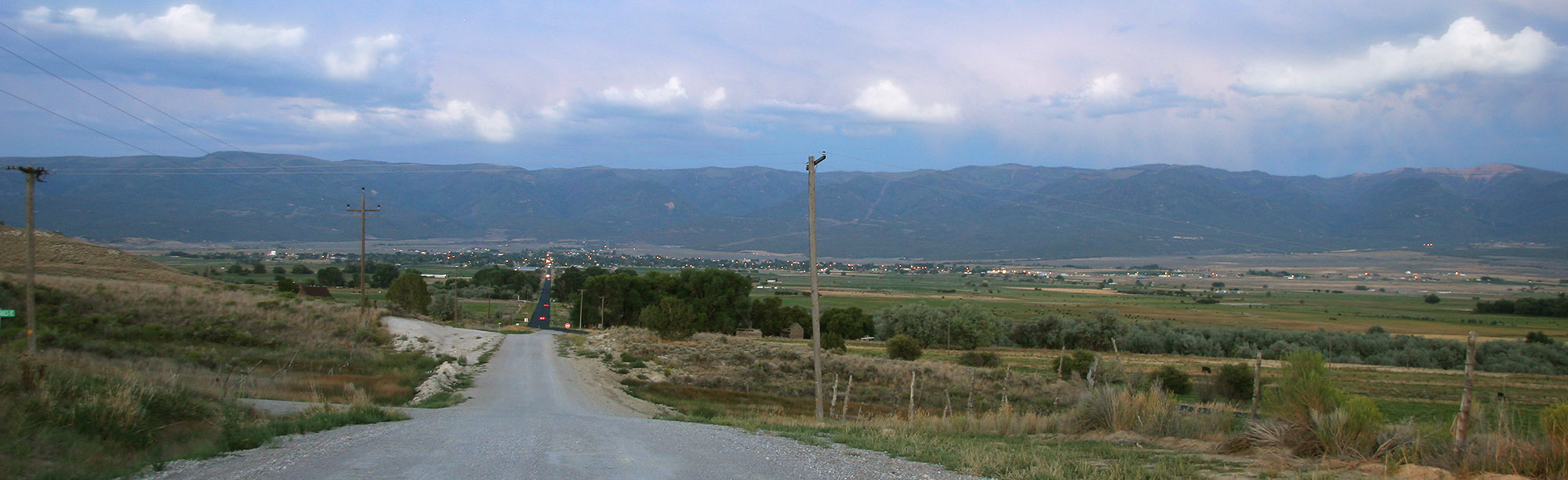
Panoramic view of Mt. Pleasant looking east along Highway 116

According to the United States Census Bureau, the city has a total area of 2.8 square miles (7.3 km^{2}).

=== Climate ===
This climatic region is typified by large seasonal temperature differences, with warm, dry summers and cold (sometimes severely cold) winters. According to the Köppen Climate Classification system, Mount Pleasant has a warm summer continental climate, abbreviated "DFB" on climate maps.

== Demographics ==
Historical population
Census	Pop.	Note	%±
1860	746		—
1870	1,346		80.4%
1880	2,004		48.9%
1890	2,254		12.5%
1900	2,372		5.2%
1910	2,280		−3.9%
1920	2,418		6.1%
1930	2,284		−5.5%
1940	2,382		4.3%
1950	2,030		−14.8%
1960	1,572		−22.6%
1970	1,516		−3.6%
1980	2,049		35.2%
1990	2,092		2.1%
2000	2,707		29.4%
2010	3,260		20.4%
2020	3,655		12.1%
U.S. Decennial Census

=== 2020 census ===
As of the 2020 census, Mount Pleasant had a population of 3,655. The median age was 32.2 years; 32.3% of residents were under the age of 18 and 16.8% of residents were 65 years of age or older. For every 100 females there were 106.3 males, and for every 100 females age 18 and over there were 99.4 males age 18 and over.

There were 1,117 households in Mount Pleasant, of which 37.8% had children under the age of 18 living in them. Of all households, 61.4% were married-couple households, 13.9% were households with a male householder and no spouse or partner present, and 21.1% were households with a female householder and no spouse or partner present. About 22.4% of all households were made up of individuals and 12.8% had someone living alone who was 65 years of age or older.

There were 1,210 housing units, of which 7.7% were vacant. The homeowner vacancy rate was 1.2% and the rental vacancy rate was 4.4%.

0.0% of residents lived in urban areas, while 100.0% lived in rural areas.

Racial composition as of the 2020 census
Race	Number	Percent
White	3,104	84.9%
Black or African American	30	0.8%
American Indian and Alaska Native	34	0.9%
Asian	86	2.4%
Native Hawaiian and Other Pacific Islander	22	0.6%
Some other race	165	4.5%
Two or more races	214	5.9%
Hispanic or Latino (of any race)	314	8.6%

=== 2000 census ===
As of the 2000 census, there were 2,707 people, 884 households, and 655 families residing in the city. The population density was 958.8 people per square mile (370.6/km^{2}). There were 975 housing units at an average density of 345.3 per square mile (133.5/km^{2}). The racial makeup of the city was 96.45% White, 0.41% Native American, 0.48% Asian, 0.15% Pacific Islander, 1.18% from other races, and 1.33% from two or more races. Hispanic or Latino of any race were 2.66% of the population.

There were 884 households, out of which 40.7% had children under the age of 18 living with them, 62.0% were married couples living together, 7.6% had a female householder with no husband present, and 25.9% were non-families. 23.4% of all households were made up of individuals, and 13.9% had someone living alone who was 65 years of age or older. The average household size was 2.99 and the average family size was 3.56.

In the city, the population was spread out, with 36.5% under the age of 18, 8.5% from 18 to 24, 22.7% from 25 to 44, 18.6% from 45 to 64, and 13.8% who were 65 years of age or older. The median age was 30 years. For every 100 females, there were 96.6 males. For every 100 females aged 18 and over, there were 97.0 males.

The median income for a household in the city was $33,603, and the median income for a family was $40,300. Males had a median income of $32,697 versus $17,279 for females. The per capita income for the city was $13,630. About 7.0% of families and 9.2% of the population were below the poverty line, including 9.3% of those under age 18 and 9.9% of those aged 65 or over.

== Arts and culture ==
=== Annual cultural events ===
Hub City Days and the Fourth of July Celebration include a parade down state street featuring local businesses and residents. Events include a breakfast at the city park, a carnival at the city park, a rodeo featuring local cowboys, and fireworks following the rodeo.

Mt. Pleasant Pioneer Day is held the last Saturday in March.

== Education ==
Mount Pleasant is within the North Sanpete School District, and has one elementary school and North Sanpete High School, the only high school in the district. The district's middle school is located in Moroni. Mount Pleasant is also home to Wasatch Academy, a private boarding school established in 1875.

== Notable people ==
- Spencer Cox, 18th governor of Utah and 8th lieutenant governor
- Leonard B. Jordan, 23rd governor of Idaho and United States senator from Idaho; born in Mount Pleasant.
- Mike Lookinland, actor
- Cyrus H. Wheelock, the author of the LDS hymn "Ye Elders of Israel"
