= Manti, Utah =

City in Utah, United States

- City
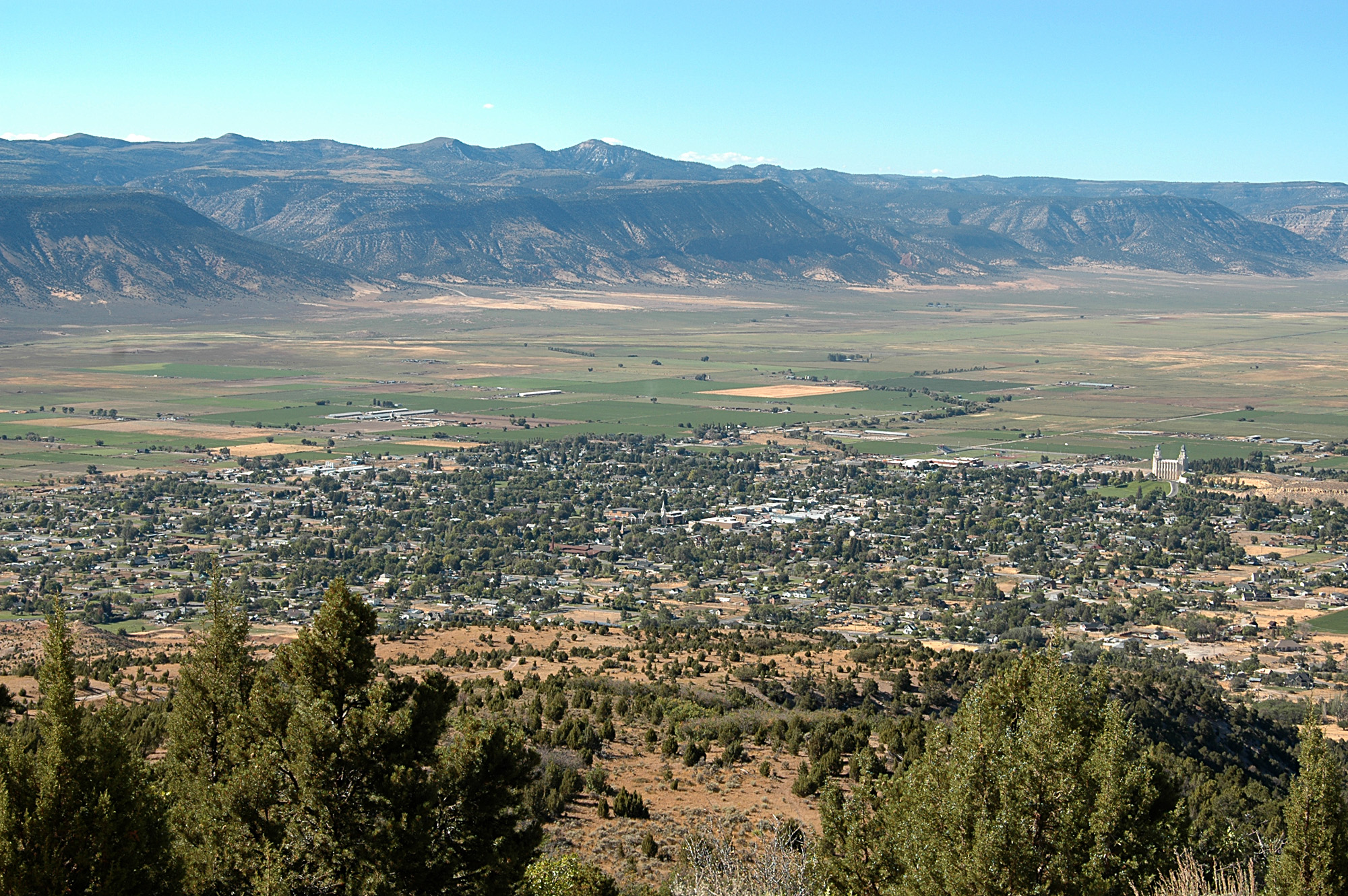
- Birdseye view of Manti and the Sanpete Valley, August 2004

- Location in Sanpete County and the state of Utah.
- Coordinates: 39°15′53″N 111°38′20″W
- Country: United States
- State: Utah
- County: Sanpete
- Founded: 1849
- Incorporated: 1851
- Founder: George Washington Bradley and Isaac Morley, Sr.
- Named for: A city in the Book of Mormon

Government
  - Mayor: Alfred "Chuck" Bigelow

Area
  - Total: 3.15 sq mi (8.17 km^{2})
  - Land: 3.15 sq mi (8.17 km^{2})
  - Water: 0 sq mi (0.00 km^{2})
- Elevation: 5,611 ft (1,710 m)

Population (2020)
  - Total: 3,429
  - Density: 1,087/sq mi (419.7/km^{2})
- Time zone: UTC-7 (Mountain (MST))
  - Summer (DST): UTC-6 (MDT)
- ZIP code: 84642
- Area code: 435
- FIPS code: 49-47730
- GNIS feature ID: 1443136
- Website: www.manti.gov

Manti (/ˈmæntaɪ/ MAN-ty) is a city in and the county seat of Sanpete County, Utah, United States. The population was 3,429 at the 2020 United States Census.

== Description ==
Manti was the first community in Utah to be settled outside the Wasatch Front and served as the hub for the formation of many other communities in Central Utah. The Manti Utah Temple, the fifth temple built by the Church of Jesus Christ of Latter-day Saints, is found in Manti and dominates the area's skyline. Manti formerly hosted the Mormon Miracle Pageant for two weeks each summer.

== History ==
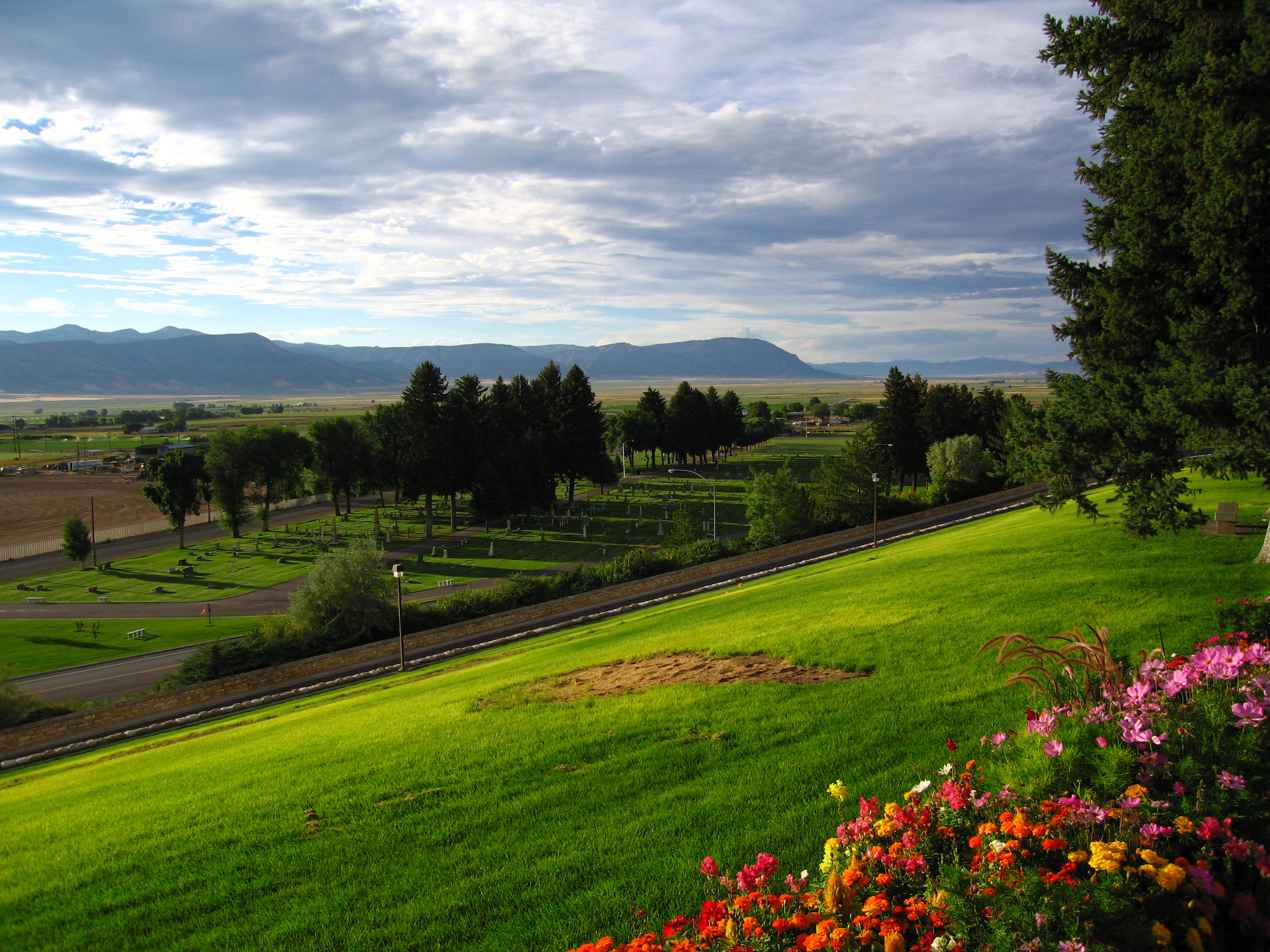
A view of Manti Cemetery from Temple Hill, August 2006

Manti was one of the first communities settled in what was to become Utah. Chief Walkara (or Walker), a Ute Tribe leader, invited Brigham Young to send pioneers to the area to teach his people the techniques of successful farming. In 1849, Brigham Young dispatched a company of about 225 settlers, consisting of several families, to the Sanpitch (now Sanpete) Valley. Under the direction of Isaac Morley, Sr. and George Washington Bradley (1813-1891), the settlers arrived at the present location of Manti in November. They endured a severe winter by living in temporary shelters dug into the south side of the hill on which the Manti Temple now stands. Brigham Young named the new community Manti, after a city mentioned in the Book of Mormon. Manti was incorporated in 1851. The first mayor of Manti was Dan Jones. Manti served as a hub city for the settlement of other communities in the valley.

Relations with the local Native Americans deteriorated rapidly, and the Wakara’s War soon ensued. The war consisted primarily of various raids conducted by the Native Americans against Mormon outposts in Central and Southern Utah. The Walker War ended in the mid-1850s in an understanding negotiated between Brigham Young and Wakara. Shortly after that, Welcome Chapman and Wakara oversaw the baptism of scores of Wakara's tribe members. Although immediate hostilities ended, none of the underlying conflicts were resolved.

In 1865 Utah's Black Hawk War erupted when an incident between a Manti resident and a young chieftain exploded into open warfare between the Mormon settlers and the local Native Americans. Forts were built in Manti and other nearby communities. Smaller settlements in the area were temporarily abandoned for the duration of the war. In the fall of 1867, Chief Black Hawk made peace with the settlers, but sporadic violence occurred until 1872, when federal troops intervened. Many Mormon settlers who fought and died in the wars are buried in the Manti Cemetery. Most of the Utes were eventually relocated to the Uintah and Ouray Indian Reservation in Eastern Utah.

== Geography ==
According to the United States Census Bureau, the city has a total area of 2.0 square miles (5.1 km^{2}), all land.

Manti has a humid continental climate (Köppen Dfb) with warm summers and cold winters, receiving on average barely enough rainfall to avoid a semi-arid classification (BSk). Its high elevation means that the climate is cooler than other populated areas of Utah, especially during summer. Summers highs average in the mid-80s°F, with winter highs in the mid-30s°F. Winter lows, however, dip to around 15–20 °F. Pacific storms move through the region from October through May and spring is the wettest season. However, summer, which is the driest season, primarily relies on precipitation from scattered diurnal thunderstorm activity and the Gulf of California monsoon. Winter and spring see frequent snowfall. Precipitation averages 12.70 inches and snowfall 52.2 inches. The record high temperature is 110 °F (43 °C), set on August 6, 1895, while the record low is −27 °F (−33 °C), set on January 22, 1937.

Although Utah as a whole only averages 2–3 tornadoes per year, Manti was hit directly by an F2 tornado on September 8, 2002. The tornado was on the ground for 15 minutes and managed to cause $2 million in damage as it tore through southeastern Manti. No one was injured or killed in the incident.

Climate data for Manti 1991-2020, extremes 1893-
Month	Jan	Feb	Mar	Apr	May	Jun	Jul	Aug	Sep	Oct	Nov	Dec	Year
Record high °F (°C)	63 (17)	70 (21)	82 (28)	88 (31)	98 (37)	106 (41)	108 (42)	110 (43)	100 (38)	90 (32)	76 (24)	66 (19)	110 (43)
Mean daily maximum °F (°C)	37.9 (3.3)	42.6 (5.9)	53.1 (11.7)	59.4 (15.2)	69.0 (20.6)	79.8 (26.6)	87.1 (30.6)	85.1 (29.5)	76.9 (24.9)	64.2 (17.9)	50.0 (10.0)	37.6 (3.1)	61.9 (16.6)
Mean daily minimum °F (°C)	18.5 (−7.5)	22.5 (−5.3)	29.2 (−1.6)	34.1 (1.2)	41.8 (5.4)	49.7 (9.8)	57.1 (13.9)	55.7 (13.2)	47.3 (8.5)	36.3 (2.4)	26.6 (−3.0)	18.5 (−7.5)	36.4 (2.5)
Record low °F (°C)	−27 (−33)	−26 (−32)	−5 (−21)	8 (−13)	18 (−8)	27 (−3)	32 (0)	34 (1)	17 (−8)	4 (−16)	−8 (−22)	−24 (−31)	−27 (−33)
Average precipitation inches (mm)	0.99 (25)	0.97 (25)	1.27 (32)	1.39 (35)	1.47 (37)	0.91 (23)	0.69 (18)	0.83 (21)	1.06 (27)	1.26 (32)	0.99 (25)	1.22 (31)	13.05 (331)
Average snowfall inches (cm)	10.3 (26)	10.4 (26)	5.9 (15)	4.6 (12)	0.7 (1.8)	trace	0 (0)	0 (0)	0 (0)	1.1 (2.8)	6.6 (17)	13.3 (34)	52.9 (134.6)
Average precipitation days (≥ 0.01 in)	7.7	8.0	8.0	8.8	8.1	4.5	5.8	6.5	5.7	6.2	6.1	7.9	83.3
Average snowy days (≥ 0.1 in)	6.0	5.4	3.7	2.6	0.3	0.0	0	0	0	0.8	3.4	6.4	28.6
Source 1:
Source 2: NCEI

== Demographics ==
Historical population
Census	Pop.	Note	%±
1860	913		—
1870	1,239		35.7%
1880	1,748		41.1%
1890	1,950		11.6%
1900	2,425		24.4%
1910	2,437		0.5%
1920	2,412		−1.0%
1930	2,200		−8.8%
1940	2,268		3.1%
1950	2,051		−9.6%
1960	1,739		−15.2%
1970	1,803		3.7%
1980	2,080		15.4%
1990	2,268		9.0%
2000	3,040		34.0%
2010	3,276		7.8%
2020	3,429		4.7%
U.S. Decennial Census

=== 2020 census ===
As of the 2020 census, Manti had a population of 3,429. The median age was 34.4 years. 31.1% of residents were under the age of 18 and 17.9% of residents were 65 years of age or older. For every 100 females there were 104.4 males, and for every 100 females age 18 and over there were 104.0 males age 18 and over.

0.0% of residents lived in urban areas, while 100.0% lived in rural areas.

There were 1,068 households in Manti, of which 39.2% had children under the age of 18 living in them. Of all households, 63.5% were married-couple households, 12.5% were households with a male householder and no spouse or partner present, and 22.2% were households with a female householder and no spouse or partner present. About 19.9% of all households were made up of individuals and 13.9% had someone living alone who was 65 years of age or older.

There were 1,193 housing units, of which 10.5% were vacant. The homeowner vacancy rate was 1.1% and the rental vacancy rate was 5.2%.

Racial composition as of the 2020 census
Race	Number	Percent
White	3,102	90.5%
Black or African American	17	0.5%
American Indian and Alaska Native	34	1.0%
Asian	4	0.1%
Native Hawaiian and Other Pacific Islander	26	0.8%
Some other race	96	2.8%
Two or more races	150	4.4%
Hispanic or Latino (of any race)	182	5.3%

=== 2000 census ===
As of the 2000 census, there were 3,040 people, 930 households, and 742 families residing in the city. The population density was 1,560.2 people per square mile (601.9/km^{2}). There were 1,010 housing units at an average density of 518.3 per square mile (200.0/km^{2}). The racial makeup of the city was 96.48% White, 0.07% African American, 1.58% Native American, 0.07% Asian, 0.43% Pacific Islander, 0.49% from other races, and 0.89% from two or more races. Hispanic or Latino of any race were 2.60% of the population.

There were 930 households, out of which 46.7% had children under the age of 18 living with them, 68.0% were married couples living together, 9.7% had a female householder with no husband present, and 20.2% were non-families. 18.8% of all households were made up of individuals, and 11.6% had someone living alone who was 65 years of age or older. The average household size was 3.25 and the average family size was 3.74.

In the city, the population was spread out, with 38.1% under the age of 18, 10.6% from 18 to 24, 20.6% from 25 to 44, 17.6% from 45 to 64, and 13.2% who were 65 years of age or older. The median age was 26 years. For every 100 females, there were 97.8 males. For every 100 females age 18 and over, there were 91.1 males.

The median income for a household in the city was $32,844, and the median income for a family was $37,163. Males had a median income of $30,156 versus $22,500 for females. The per capita income for the city was $12,677. About 11.4% of families and 13.0% of the population were below the poverty line, including 16.0% of those under age 18 and 7.8% of those age 65 or over.

== Education ==
Manti is located in the South Sanpete School District, and has one elementary school, as well Manti High School, who have the Templars as their mascot and compete in the 3A level of competition (out of five levels). Middle school students attend in nearby Ephraim.

== Notable people ==
- William H. Folsom (1815-1901), architect and designer of the Manti Temple
- Julia Christiansen Hoffman (1856–1934), artist and arts patron, Portland, Oregon
- Ed "Big Daddy" Roth, Hot-Rod art, customizing and pinstriping, notable for Rat Fink
- Joyce Eliason (1934-2022), American author, television writer and producer

== See also ==
- List of cities and towns in Utah
- Ephraim, Utah
