= National Alliance for Youth Sports =

- Company type: Nonprofit organization
- Founded: 1981 as NYSCA later renamed National Alliance for Youth Sports in 1993
- Founder: Fred Engh
- Headquarters: West Palm Beach, Florida, United States
- Area served: Worldwide
- Key people: John Engh; Executive Director
- Revenue: 3,872,781 United States dollar (2022)
- Total assets: 3,126,804 United States dollar (2022)
- Website: www.nays.org

The National Alliance for Youth Sports (NAYS) is a non-profit 501(c)(3) organization based in West Palm Beach, Florida, U.S.A.. NAYS provides a variety of programs and services for everyone involved in youth sports, including professional and volunteer administrators, volunteer coaches, officials, parents and young athletes.

== Mission ==
NAYS seeks to make the sports experience safe, fun and healthy for all children. In addition, NAYS promotes the value and importance of sports and physical activities for the emotional, physical, social and mental development of youth. NAYS believes that participation in sports and activities develops important character traits and lifelong values. In addition, NAYS believes that the lives of youngsters can be positively impacted by their participation in sports and physical activities if the adults involved have proper training and information.

NAYS is committed to making sports safe and positive by providing programs and services that add value to these activities. NAYS believes this happens by:

- Providing children with positive instruction and building basic motor skills
- Training administrators (both professional and volunteer), volunteer coaches and officials on their roles and responsibilities
- Having parents complete an orientation program to understand the important impact sports has on their child's development
- Using the National Standards For Youth Sports as a guide for operating youth sports programs
- Helping organizations understand the importance of conducting their youth sports programs in accordance with the Recommendations for Communities

== History ==
Fred Engh, the President and CEO of NAYS, founded the organization in 1981. He has been involved in youth sports for more than 35 years as a coach, athletic director, sports educator and parent of seven children. In 1999, he wrote Why Johnny Hates Sports, a book that examines the state of youth sports in America and provides solutions to many of the problems plaguing organized programs.

Originally named the National Youth Sports Coaches Association (NYSCA), the organization initially focused on educating volunteer coaches on their wide range of responsibilities and the importance of meeting the needs of every child. NYSCA is a volunteer coaches training program that has been utilized by more than 3 million volunteer coaches worldwide. With the realization that volunteer coaches are only one aspect of the youth sports equation, NYSCA evolved into the National Alliance for Youth Sports in 1993.

Today, NAYS is the nation's leading youth sports educator and advocate with national programs that educate administrators, coaches, officials and parents about their roles and responsibilities in youth sports, in addition to offering youth development programs for children.

NAYS programs are provided at the local level through dynamic partnerships with more than 3,000 community-based organizations, which include parks and recreation departments, Boys & Girls Clubs of America, Police Athletic League, YMCA/YWCAs, Catholic Youth Organizations and other independent youth service groups throughout the country. NAYS also has a strong presence on military installations worldwide.

=== Timeline ===
| Year | Event |
|---|---|
| 1981 | – NYSCA founded. – Board of Directors formed. |
| 1982 | – Stokely-Van Camp, Inc., maker of Gatorade Thirst Quenchers, sponsors NYSCA. |
| 1985 | – DeKalb County, Georgia becomes the first to mandate that its volunteer coaches complete the NYSCA certification program. |
| 1987 | – 46 experts representing different organizations gather to develop the first ever National Standards for Youth Sports. |
| 1990 | – Hook A Kid On Golf established with its first Introductory Clinic. United States Golf Association announces $90,000 matching grant program and Professional golfer Bob Murphy (golfer) becomes the national spokesperson. |
| 1993 | – NYSCA evolves into the National Alliance for Youth Sports. |
| 1994 | – Start Smart Sports Development Program launched and first program held in Naples, Florida. |
| 1996 | – National Youth Sports Officials Association certifies 1,040 officials during its first year. – The Alliance website launches. – Bob King, director of the Bradley County Parks & Recreation department in Cleveland, Tennessee certifies NYSCA's one-millionth coach. King receives a special letter of recognition from President Bill Clinton. |
| 1997 | – 228 recreation professionals from 44 states and 12 countries attend the first Academy for Youth Sports Administrators in Mobile, Alabama. |
| 1998 | – Start Smart unveils sport-specific soccer and baseball programs to prepare children for a smooth transition into those sports. – The doors to Hook A Kid On Golf's first-ever state office open in Illinois, thanks to the passionate efforts of Jerry Rich. |
| 1999 | – More than 100 youngsters from 16 cities nationwide arrive in Peoria, Illinois for the first Hook A Kid On Golf Traditions of Golf Challenge. – Why Johnny Hates Sports, written by Alliance President Fred Engh, hits bookshelves nationwide. |
| 2000 | – The Jupiter-Tequesta Athletic Association becomes the first organization in the country to make the recently launched Parents Association for Youth Sports program mandatory. More than 2,000 parents file into Roger Dean Stadium for the first mandatory PAYS session, which is covered by the NBC Nightly News, ABC World News Tonight, CBS Evening News, ESPN, Sports Illustrated and CNN, among others. – The National Youth Sports Administrators Association program is launched for league presidents, board members and other volunteer administrators. – Athletic Business Magazine and NAYS introduce the Excellence in Youth Sports Award. |
| 2002 | – Recommendations for Communities, which were established from the National Summit on Raising Community Standards in Children's Sports, are released. – More than 300 delegates convene in San Antonio, Texas, for the first-ever Youth Sports Congress. Award-winning writer Lester Munson of Sports Illustrated delivers the keynote address. |
| 2003 | – Parents have the opportunity to go through the Parents Association for Youth Sports program from the comfort of home thanks to unveiling of the on-line program. – The International Alliance for Youth Sports formed. – First International Summit held in Atlanta, Georgia. |
| 2004 | – After thousands of NYSCA clinics that have been held in big cities, small towns and on various continents, the 2 millionth coach is trained. – The Global Gear Drive initiative is created to distributing sporting goods equipment to children in developing countries. |
| 2005 | – High-ranking sports officials from more than a dozen countries throughout the Caribbean, as well as Mexico and Zambia, gather in Roseau, Dominica, for the first-ever Caribbean Conference on Children's Sports. – SportingKid magazine becomes the official member publication of NAYS. The full-color magazine delivered to volunteer coaches, parents, administrators and officials six times a year is packed with information to enhance the youth sports experience for everyone involved. – Game On! Youth Sports, a first-of-its-kind approach that creates opportunities for children to participate in healthy physical activities that otherwise wouldn't have the opportunity to do so, is launched in Dominica. – Coaching Soccer for Dummies (the first in a series) is released in partnership with Wiley Publishing. – The Sammy Wilkinson Memorial Foundation is established to support NAYS' international efforts. |
| 2006 | – NYSCA Clinics are made available online for the first time. – Alliance celebrates its 25th anniversary as the leading advocate for positive and safe sports for children. – Alliance releases background check guidelines to assist leagues based on findings from a special session on background screening held during the Youth Sports Congress in Denver. |
| 2007 | – The Youth Sports Congress is held in conjunction with the Athletic Business Conference in Orlando, FL. |
| 2008 | – The National Standards for Youth Sports are reviewed and updated by over 200 youth sports professionals in San Antonio, Texas. – The first ever NAYS Youth Sports Study was conducted with the results featured in SportingKid magazine. |
| 2009 | – NYSCA members are given access to a personalized online page. – NYSCA unveils its Coach Ratings Tool. – The NAYS Chapter Management system is created allowing chapters instant access to training, background check and evaluation information on their members. |
| 2010 | – The Accountability Policies and Procedures for NYSCA members is released to track coach incidents through NAYS chapters. – The NYSCA Coach Training program is re-released that includes Pete Carroll, Mike Krzyzewski, Vivian Stringer, John Harbaugh and many others. |
| 2011 | – The Ready, Set, RUN! program was created. – IAYS and the Peace Corps formed a new partnership. |
| 2012 | – A new NYSCA Online area was unveiled to volunteer coaches. – Alliance releases updated background check guidelines to assist leagues based on findings from screening session held during the Youth Sports Congress in Orlando. – A new NYSAA Online area was unveiled to volunteer administrators. |
| 2013 | – The NYSCA Select program was created for elite and traveling coaches. – Alliance unveils a new Concussion and Bullying Prevention Training programs for volunteer coaches and parents. Both programs are offered at no cost. – A new PAYS Online area was unveiled for parents. |
| 2014 | – Free Concussion and Bullying Prevention Training programs were created for non-members. – A new NYSOA Online area was unveiled to volunteer officials and referees. In addition a new CYSA Online area was unveiled to professional administrators. – The Sports Parent Pledge was created to promote positivity and have parents advocate for good sportsmanship in youth sports. – Alliance unveils a new Prevention Against Abuse Training program for coaches and parents. – NAYS launches a new video web series called Game Changers featuring current and former professional coaches and players. |
| 2015 | – Alliance unveils a new Mental Health Challenges Training program for volunteer coaches. – NAYS created SportingKid Live, an online resource for youth sports related news, to replace its SportingKid magazine. |
| 2016 | – NAYS unveils new logos and program names to connect under one brand. – New Basketball Training is launched and split into two age groups (U10 and U16). – NAYS Founder and CEO Fred Engh retires. |
| 2017 | – Revised National Standards for Youth Sports are released. – A new Coaching Youth Sports training video is released by NAYS. – The NAYS online store is redesigned. |

== Membership/Education ==
NAYS' membership/education programs are designed to properly train and prepare adults for their roles and responsibilities in youth sports.

=== NAYS Coach Training & Membership ===
The NAYS Coach Training & Membership is a membership program and has educated more than 3 million coaches since its inception in 1981. More than 3,000 community-based organizations offer this program. To become a member, coaches must (1) participate in an NAYS Coach Training interactive video, (2) successfully complete an exam and (3) sign a pledge committing to uphold the NAYS Code of Ethics for Coaches. Members not adhering to NAYS Code of Ethics for Coaches may have their membership revoked.

The web-designed course delivers an e-learning experience in six topic areas including what it means to be a coach, youth sports violence, conducting practices, game day, injury prevention, and nutrition and hydration.

=== NAYS Parent Orientation ===
The NAYS Parent Orientation is a membership program for parents promoting positive youth sports. The program began in 1999 and since that time, more than 100,000 families have become members. The NAYS Parent Orientation sets a standard for parent education by holding them accountable for themselves through the NAYS Code of Ethics for Parents and by helping them become positively involved in the youth sports experience.

To become a member, parents must (1) participate in a NAYS Parent Orientation interactive video and (2) sign a pledge committing to uphold the NAYS Code of Ethics for Parents.

=== NAYS League Director Training & Membership ===
The NAYS League Director Training & Membership is a membership program for volunteers responsible for the planning and implementation of out-of-school sports programs. To become a member, administrators must (1) participate in an NAYS League Director interactive video and (2) successfully complete the exam and (3) sign a pledge committing to uphold the NAYS Code of Ethics for League Directors.

=== NAYS Academy for Youth Sports Administrators ===
The NAYS Academy for Youth Sports Administrators is a 20-hour certification program that is designed to raise the professionalism of those delivering youth sports services. The academy, either on-site or online, is the only way to earn Certified Youth Sports Administrator credentials (CYSA). During the academy, faculty members cover such topics as youth sports philosophy, mission statements, policies and procedures, volunteer management, child abuse, parents, conflict management, insurance and risk management, and inclusion of children with disabilities. Currently, more than 4,000 CYSA's have graduated from the academy.

=== NAYS Officials Training & Membership ===
The NAYS Officials Training & Membership is a membership program for volunteer game officials to better understand their roles and responsibilities when officiating youth sports. To become a member, officials must (1) participate in an NAYS Officials Training interactive video and (2) successfully complete the exam and (3) sign a pledge committing to uphold the NAYS Code of Ethics for Officials.

== Youth Development ==
NAYS' youth development division consists of three youth sports programs – Start Smart Sports Development Programs, Hook A Kid On Golf and Ready, Set, RUN!

=== Start Smart Sports Development Programs ===
The Start Smart Sports Development Program brings parents and children (ages 3–5) together to learn pre-sports skills such as catching, kicking, throwing and batting. The Start Smart curriculum includes six lessons that teach parents how to work with their children to develop motor skills.

Start Smart is conducted in nearly 400 communities each year and has been mandated on every US Army installation around the world. Approximately 22,000 children participate in the Start Smart program annually.

==== Sports Specific Skill Development Programs ====
Start Smart offers sport-specific programs in baseball, soccer, basketball, golf, football and tennis, as well as a general sports development program. These programs teach parents and their children (ages 3–5) basic motor skill development and sport-specific skills while preparing the child for organized sports participation. Start Smart sport-specific programs teach children the most basic concepts of each sport.

=== Hook A Kid On Golf ===
Hook A Kid On Golf is the largest junior golf program in the country and has benefited nearly 75,000 participants and has been in more than 500 communities in the United States. Established in 1990, the program focuses on providing communities with a junior golf program with three levels: the Tee Level Introductory Clinic, Green Level Training Program and Challenge Golf League. Hook A Kid On Golf also hosts a junior golf event, the Traditions of Golf Challenge, which combines a team's playing score with rules, etiquette and history knowledge.

=== Traditions of Golf ===
The Traditions of Golf Challenge is an annual event that combines playing scores with rules, etiquette and history knowledge. Communities that conduct any level of the Hook A Kid On Golf program are eligible to participate in the Traditions of Golf Challenge. Each team's score from their round is combined with their "Traditions of Golf" score to determine the overall champion of the two-day tournament.

Past Winners Include:

1999 – West Palm Beach, Florida

2000 – Derby, Kansas

2001 – New Braunfels, Texas

2002 – Cuernavaca, Mexico

2003 – Cuernavaca, Mexico

2004 – Prospect Heights, Illinois

2005 – Prospect Heights, Illinois

2006 – Cuernavaca, Mexico

2007 – Prospect Heights, Illinois

2008 – West Palm Beach, Florida

2009 – Bloomington, Indiana

2010 – Prospect Heights, Illinois

2012 – Prospect Heights, Illinois

== Awards ==
=== Excellence in Youth Sports Award ===
The Excellence in Youth Sports Award, is presented in partnership with Athletic Business magazine. The award recognizes organizations and agencies that conduct multifaceted sports programs. Five winners from these organizations are recognized each year. The organizations that apply include YMCA/YWCA, Boys & Girls Clubs of America, Jewish Community Center, Catholic Youth Organization, Parks and Recreation, Independent Leagues/Organizations and Military Installations.

Past Winners Include:

2000 – City of Greenacres, City of Tulsa, Hanscom Air Force Base, National Trial Parks & Recreation District, Patrick Air Force Base

2001 – Boys & Girls Club of Ellsworth Air Force Base, Falcon Trail Youth Center, Moody Air Force Base, City of North Miami Beach, City of Oregon

2002 – Eglin Air Force Base, Boys & Girls Club of Lackland Air Force Base, Orange County, South Suburban Parks & Recreation, YMCA at White Rock

2003 – Southeast YMCA of Greater Grand Rapids, Pleasant Dale Park District, Peoria Community Services, Child & Youth Services Fort Campbell, Kadena Youth Sports &Fitness

2004 – Boys & Girls Club of Green Bay, St. Andrews Parish Parks & Playground, Town of Hamburg Recreation Department, Tyndall Air Force Base, Schweinfut Army Base

2005 – City of Greensboro Parks & Recreation, City of Westerville Parks and Recreation Department, Gainesville Parks and Recreation, Mountain Home Air Force Base Youth Programs, Peterson Air Force Base Youth Center

2006 – Beale Air Force Base Youth Center, Indy parks and Recreation, City of Henderson Parks and Recreation, Hickam Air Force Base Youth Sports Program, Tinker Air Force Base Youth Center

2007 – Botetourt County Parks and Recreation Department, Fort Knox Child and Youth Services Sports and Fitness, Commander Fleet Activities Youth Sports, Misawa Youth Sports Program, St. Andrews Parish Parks and Playground Commission

2008 – City of Clearwater Parks and Recreation Department, City of Evans Parks and Recreation Department, Hickam Air Force Base Youth Sports Program, Tinker Air Force Base Youth Center, USAG Fort Belvoir Youth Sports

2009 – Andrews Air Force Base Youth Sports, Marine Corps Air Ground Combat Center, Sasebo Youth Sports, Town of Huntersville Parks & Recreation Department, USAG West Point Youth Sports & Fitness

2010 – Glynn County Parks & Recreation, MCAS-MCCS Miramar Youth Sports Programs, Oconee County Parks & Recreation, Spangdahlem Air Base Youth Sports, USAG Hawaii Youth Sports and Fitness

2011 – MCCS Cherry Point Youth Sports, Village of Evendale Recreation, Kaiserslautern Military Community Youth Sports and Fitness Program, Town of Westport Parks and Recreation, Joint Base Elmendorf-Richardson Youth Sports Program

2012 – Camp Lejeune Youth Sports, Churchville Recreation Council, Gwinnett County Parks and Recreation, Hillsborough County Parks, Recreation and Conservation Department's Youth Athletic Services, Joint Base McGuire-Dix-Lakehurst Youth Sports & Fitness Program

2013 – Botetourt County Parks, Recreation and Tourism, Fort Rucker Youth Sports and Fitness, Glynn County Recreation & Parks Department, Mecklenburg County Park and Recreation, Tinker Air Force Base Youth Programs

2014 - Dyess Air Force Base Youth Sports, JBLE Fort Eustis Youth Sports & Fitness Program, Jefferson City Parks, Recreation & Forestry, MCAS Miramar Youth Sports Program, Suffolk Parks & Recreation

2015 - Beale Air Force Base Youth Programs, Camp Pendleton Youth Sports, Cherokee Recreation & Parks Agency, Fort Leonard Wood Youth Sports & Fitness, Mountain Home Air Force Base Youth Sports Programs, NSA Bahrain Child and Youth Programs, Oconee County Parks and Recreation Department, US Army Garrison Hawaii, Youth Sports & Fitness Program

2016 - County of Los Angeles Department of Parks and Recreation – East Agency, Detroit Parks and Recreation Department, Naval Station Rota Spain Youth Sports and Fitness Program, Town of Cary Parks, Recreation & Cultural Resources, United States Army Garrison Stuttgart Youth Sports & Fitness

2017 - City of Henderson, Public Works, Parks and Recreation Department Sports Section, Fort Sill CYS Youth Sports and Fitness, Hurlburt Field Youth Sports Program, Joint Base Pearl Harbor–Hickam Youth Sports and Fitness, National Trail Parks and Recreation District

=== NAYS Volunteer Coach of the Year Award ===
The Coach of the Year award is given annually to a coach who has positively affected youth sports in his/her community and upholds the NAYS Code of Ethics for Coaches.

=== NAYS Youth Sports Parent of the Year Award ===
The Parent of the Year award is given annually to an outstanding parent that upholds the NAYS Code of Ethics for Parents. This parent encourages good sportsmanship, demands a safe and healthy environment for their child and others, demands their child's coach be trained, supports coaches, players, officials and administrators and respects and demonstrates good treatment of players, coaches, fans and officials.

== Media ==
The National Alliance for Youth Sports has been featured in the following media.

ESPN, USA Today, Golf Channel, Sports Illustrated, U.S. News & World Report, CNN, ABC News, NBC News, Dateline NBC, Reader's Digest, Family Circle, Time magazine, Boston Globe, Chicago Tribune, Los Angeles Times, Parents Magazine, and The Washington Post.
