= List of United States tornadoes from June to July 2017 =

This page documents all tornadoes confirmed by various weather forecast offices of the National Weather Service in the United States throughout June and July 2017.

== United States yearly total ==
Confirmed tornadoes by Enhanced Fujita rating
EFU	EF0	EF1	EF2	EF3	EF4	EF5	Total
67	618	592*	128	13	2	0	1,420

- Note: An EF2 tornado from Canada crossed into the United States, where that portion of the track was rated EF1.

== June ==
Confirmed tornadoes by Enhanced Fujita rating
EFU	EF0	EF1	EF2	EF3	EF4	EF5	Total
3	78	50	11	0	0	0	142

=== June 5 event ===
List of confirmed tornadoes – Monday, June 5, 2017 (Note: All dates are based on the local time zone where the tornado touched down; however, all times are in Coordinated Universal Time for consistency.)
EF#	Location	County / Parish	State	Start Coord.	Time (UTC)	Path length	Max width
EF0	SSW of Bennett	Arapahoe	CO	39.72°N 104.44°W	20:32–20:34	0.01 mi (0.016 km)	25 yd (23 m)
EF0	A storm chaser observed a landspout tornado that tossed lawn furniture.						
EF0	NE of Pembroke Pines	Broward	FL	26.0319°N 80.3133°W	23:07–23:08	0.06 mi (0.097 km)	10 yd (9.1 m)
EF0	A member of the public recorded a tornado.						
EF1	SSW of Parmele	Pitt	NC	35.766°N 77.33°W	23:25–23:26	0.28 mi (0.45 km)	100 yd (91 m)
EF1	A storage barn was severely damaged, an older building sustained significant damage, and power lines were knocked down. Trees were knocked down, blocking the train tracks, and hardwood trees were snapped or uprooted.						

=== June 6 event ===
List of confirmed tornadoes – Tuesday, June 6, 2017
EF#	Location	County / Parish	State	Start Coord.	Time (UTC)	Path length	Max width
EF1	W of Crescent Beach	St. Johns	FL	29.7373°N 81.3120°W	18:11–18:16	2.21 mi (3.56 km)	70 yd (64 m)
EF1	Mainly tree and power line damage occurred.						

=== June 7 event ===
List of confirmed tornadoes – Wednesday, June 7, 2017
EF#	Location	County / Parish	State	Start Coord.	Time (UTC)	Path length	Max width
EF0	SSW of Inkster	Grand Forks	ND	48.07°N 97.69°W	17:49–17:52	0.2 mi (0.32 km)	25 yd (23 m)
EF0	Grand Forks Air Force Base Officials reported a tornado.						
EF0	W of Hatton	Steele, Traill	ND	47.62°N 97.50°W	17:59–18:10	3 mi (4.8 km)	75 yd (69 m)
EF0	Tornado remained over open fields, causing some ground scarring but no significant damage.						
EF0	SSE of Arvilla	Grand Forks	ND	47.89°N 97.49°W	18:02–18:04	0.25 mi (0.40 km)	50 yd (46 m)
EF0	Law enforcement reported a tornado with no significant damage.						
EF0	N of Mayville	Traill	ND	47.52°N 97.36°W	18:13–18:15	0.5 mi (0.80 km)	100 yd (91 m)
EF0	Local residents and observers reported a tornado.						
EF0	W of Emerado	Grand Forks	ND	47.92°N 97.43°W	18:17–18:19	0.58 mi (0.93 km)	100 yd (91 m)
EF0	Tree limbs were broke in a shelter belt, and debris was slung into a field.						
EF0	S of Emerado	Grand Forks	ND	47.82°N 97.36°W	18:18–18:21	1 mi (1.6 km)	100 yd (91 m)
EF0	Grand Forks Air Force Base observers, locals, and a deputy observed a tornado.						
EF0	SSE of Hatton	Traill	ND	47.57°N 97.42°W	18:18–18:28	4 mi (6.4 km)	100 yd (91 m)
EF0	A tall dust swirl was observed.						
EF0	W of Reynolds	Grand Forks	ND	47.69°N 97.34°W	18:23–18:30	1.87 mi (3.01 km)	75 yd (69 m)
EF0	A tornado tracked for several minutes without damage.						
EF0	ESE of Woodrow	Washington	CO	39.95°N 103.34°W	00:28–00:33	0.1 mi (0.16 km)	25 yd (23 m)
EF0	A trained spotter observed a tornado which touched down in open country, causing no reported damage.						

=== June 9 event ===
List of confirmed tornadoes – Friday, June 9, 2017
EF#	Location	County / Parish	State	Start Coord.	Time (UTC)	Path length	Max width
EF0	Beecher	Will	IL	41.3534°N 87.6233°W	21:05–21:06	0.21 mi (0.34 km)	20 yd (18 m)
EF0	A weak landspout tornado briefly touched down in Beecher. No damage occurred.						
EF0	E of Wales	Cavalier	ND	48.91°N 98.56°W	23:09–23:12	2 mi (3.2 km)	200 yd (180 m)
EF0	Numerous tree limbs and branches were snapped throughout multiple shelter belts. Fields were stripped of crops by wind-driven hail.						
EF1	N of Langdon	Cavalier	ND	48.81°N 98.37°W	23:27–23:29	1.29 mi (2.08 km)	600 yd (550 m)
EF1	The doors were ripped from a seed company elevator; door and roof panels were strewn around in a circular pattern. Six power poles were snapped.						
EF2	ENE of Langdon to S of Mountain	Cavalier, Pembina	ND	48.81°N 98.21°W	23:45–00:14	19 mi (31 km)	800 yd (730 m)
EF2	This large tornado was embedded in hail and downburst winds. Large power poles were snapped, roofing was torn from homes, metal pole sheds were completely destroyed, metal grain bins were crushed, and sheet metal was scattered up to a mile or more through fields. Bean and grain fields were heavily scoured as well.						
EF2	S of Knox	Benson	ND	48.26°N 99.74°W	00:08–00:20	8 mi (13 km)	600 yd (550 m)
EF2	Numerous trees were snapped or uprooted in shelter belts and groves. A mobile doppler radar system measured peak winds of 119 mph (192 km/h).						
EF0	S of Brinsmade	Benson	ND	48.14°N 99.32°W	00:34–00:37	2.05 mi (3.30 km)	200 yd (180 m)
EF0	Storm chasers videoed the ground swirl of a tornado.						
EF0	E of Devils Lake	Ramsey	ND	48.11°N 98.77°W	01:27	0.1 mi (0.16 km)	20 yd (18 m)
EF0	A brief tornado was reported.						
EF0	SSW of Warwick	Eddy	ND	47.76°N 98.76°W	01:29–01:33	3 mi (4.8 km)	150 yd (140 m)
EF0	Large tree branches and limbs were broken off.						
EF0	SW of Walum	Griggs	ND	47.25°N 98.22°W	02:32–02:33	0.1 mi (0.16 km)	75 yd (69 m)
EF0	Storm chasers observed a brief dust swirl.						

=== June 10 event ===
List of confirmed tornadoes – Saturday, June 10, 2017
EF#	Location	County / Parish	State	Start Coord.	Time (UTC)	Path length	Max width
EF1	N of Benedict	Hubbard	MN	47.18°N 94.69°W	07:10–07:11	0.6 mi (0.97 km)	150 yd (140 m)
EF1	Numerous trees were snapped or uprooted, a part of a barn's wall was blown in, and the roof was torn off a pole shed.						

=== June 11 event ===
List of confirmed tornadoes – Sunday, June 11, 2017
EF#	Location	County / Parish	State	Start Coord.	Time (UTC)	Path length	Max width
EF1	E of Kandiyohi	Kandiyohi	MN	45.1365°N 94.9001°W	18:31–18:33	1.55 mi (2.49 km)	300 yd (270 m)
EF1	A metal building had much of its roof pulled off, trees were broken, and other minor tree damage occurred.						

=== June 12 event ===
List of confirmed tornadoes – Monday, June 12, 2017
EF#	Location	County / Parish	State	Start Coord.	Time (UTC)	Path length	Max width
EFU	SW of Fort Laramie to S of Jay Em	Goshen	WY	42.1006°N 104.6379°W	21:55–22:07	23.24 mi (37.40 km)	40 yd (37 m)
EFU	Intermittent tornado remained over open country. No damage occurred.						
EF0	NE of Ranchettes	Laramie	WY	41.3045°N 104.6858°W	22:40–22:44	2.78 mi (4.47 km)	80 yd (73 m)
EF0	An irrigation center pivot was damaged, a residence sustained roof and window damage, and minor damage was inflicted to outbuildings.						
EF2	SSW of Hereford, CO to NNW of Carpenter, WY	Weld (CO), Laramie (WY)	CO, WY	40.8995°N 104.3346°W	22:40–23:08	14.98 mi (24.11 km)	300 yd (270 m)
EF2	This strong cone tornado was photographed and caught on video by numerous storm chasers. It first struck the town of Hereford at EF1 intensity, where a metal building, several homes, trees, and a church sustained minor damage. Outside of town, an irrigation pivot was overturned and outbuildings were damaged. The most intense damage occurred in Wyoming, where power poles were snapped, a small chicken coop was swept away with the concrete slab foundation cracked, a gas line was pulled out of the ground, a barn was severely damaged, and two grain bins were blown away, one of which was never found. Four residences were damaged, including a house that sustained heavy roof and window damage, and had its semi-attached garage swept completely away. A pickup truck from the garage was blown 100 yd (91 m) into a field.						
EF1	SW of Douglas	Converse	WY	42.5793°N 105.7104°W	22:49	0.5 mi (0.80 km)	25 yd (23 m)
EF1	An outbuilding was demolished.						
EF1	SSW of Pine Bluffs	Laramie	WY	41.0296°N 104.1333°W	23:05–23:12	1.51 mi (2.43 km)	80 yd (73 m)
EF1	A fifth-wheel horse trailer was lofted in the air and sustained significant damage. A small farm outbuilding was destroyed.						
EF2	N of Torrington, WY to SSW of Harrison, NE	Goshen (WY), Sioux (NE)	WY, NE	42.2760°N 104.1957°W	23:09–00:01	25.55 mi (41.12 km)	500 yd (460 m)
EF2	On a ranch, several three-quarter-ton pickup trucks were tossed several yards. Several horse trailers were rolled 50–100 yd (46–91 m) and severely damaged; three horses were killed and several others were injured. One person at the ranch residence sustained head injuries. The tornado inflicted heavy damage to a homestead and surrounding trees, injuring one resident.						
EF2	SW of Kaycee	Johnson	WY	43.6916°N 106.685°W	23:30–23:36	1.58 mi (2.54 km)	250 yd (230 m)
EF2	An abandoned trailer home was completely destroyed, with its undercarriage separated from the main structure and thrown over 200 yd (180 m). Numerous trees were snapped and denuded, and some ground scouring was observed.						
EF0	SE of Cody	Park	WY	44.42°N 108.91°W	23:50–23:52	0.69 mi (1.11 km)	25 yd (23 m)
EF0	The public reported a brief tornado over open country.						
EF1	N of Bushnell	Kimball	NE	41.3683°N 103.8818°W	00:01–00:08	0.96 mi (1.54 km)	80 yd (73 m)
EF1	A barn had its roof torn off and exterior walls collapsed, an auger and an auger cart were tipped, and power poles were broken.						
EFU	SW of Harrisburg	Banner	NE	41.3969°N 103.9754°W	00:12–00:17	0.74 mi (1.19 km)	25 yd (23 m)
EFU	An eyewitness account of a short-lived tornado which caused no reported damage was received.						
EF0	NNW of Winchester	Big Horn	WY	44.17°N 108.42°W	00:14–00:23	3.14 mi (5.05 km)	30 yd (27 m)
EF0	A trained storm spotter reported a rope tornado over open country.						
EF0	NW of Campbellsport	Fond du Lac	WI	43.6604°N 88.2283°W	00:21–00:25	2.13 mi (3.43 km)	50 yd (46 m)
EF0	This weak tornado moved across Kettle Moraine Lake, uprooting a few trees and snapping tree limbs along the shore. A boat canopy was damaged, and barn sustained minor damage to its sliding door.						
EF1	ESE of Harrisburg	Banner	NE	41.4869°N 103.64°W	00:30–00:40	4.19 mi (6.74 km)	100 yd (91 m)
EF1	A calving barn was moved about 10 yards (9.1 m), a pole barn was rolled, and a grain bin was pushed off of its foundation. Several power poles were broken and one horse was killed, with several other horses injured.						
EFU	NNW of Whitney	Dawes	NE	42.8953°N 103.3131°W	00:33–00:37	1.09 mi (1.75 km)	25 yd (23 m)
EFU	Storm chasers observed a tornado that remained over open country and caused no damage.						
EF0	NW of Casper	Natrona	WY	42.93°N 106.39°W	00:36–00:37	0.07 mi (0.11 km)	20 yd (18 m)
EF0	An emergency manager reported a brief tornado over open country.						
EF1	Bayard	Morrill	NE	41.7649°N 103.3224°W	01:13–01:17	0.24 mi (0.39 km)	50 yd (46 m)
EF1	Brief tornado struck a nursing home in Bayard, causing major roof and window damage to the structure. A garage behind the nursing home was almost completely destroyed, and trees and tree limbs were downed.						
EF2	NNW of Bayard to ESE of Alliance	Morrill, Box Butte	NE	41.8219°N 103.3408°W	01:19–02:25	31.65 mi (50.94 km)	300 yd (270 m)
EF2	A long-lived, rain-wrapped multiple-vortex tornado inflicted significant damage to a farmstead. The house had its roof ripped off and front exterior wall collapsed, a detached garage was swept cleanly away, and several trucks were slid from their original locations. Farther along its path, a metal farm outbuilding sustained damage, a mobile home and a semi-trailer were rolled, and center pivots were twisted. Damage occurred to a warehouse at the Alliance Airport, and trees along the path were snapped and denuded.						
EF1	NW of Antioch	Sheridan	NE	42.08°N 102.67°W	02:30–02:45	9.2 mi (14.8 km)	10 yd (9.1 m)
EF1	Trees and wind breaks were destroyed. An old barn and a hangar were damaged, with the latter's doors blown about 500 yd (460 m). A pile of lumber was picked up and scattered, while 30 power poles were damaged.						
EF0	SW of Allen	Bennett	SD	43.2533°N 101.9452°W	03:10–03:15	0.01 mi (0.016 km)	7 yd (6.4 m)
EF0	A trained storm spotter observed a small tornado in a field.						

=== June 13 event ===
List of confirmed tornadoes – Tuesday, June 13, 2017
EF#	Location	County / Parish	State	Start Coord.	Time (UTC)	Path length	Max width
EF0	S of Rockham	Hand	SD	44.8°N 98.84°W	21:16–21:17	0.12 mi (0.19 km)	10 yd (9.1 m)
EF0	Trained storm spotters reported a brief tornado in an open field.						
EF1	SW of Zell	Hand	SD	44.839°N 98.79°W	21:25–21:28	0.25 mi (0.40 km)	175 yd (160 m)
EF1	Numerous trees were snapped and uprooted around a farm; many trees fell on a home. A roof was torn off a barn, and a machine shed was partially destroyed.						
EF0	SSW of Zell	Hand	SD	44.86°N 98.75°W	21:32–21:33	0.1 mi (0.16 km)	10 yd (9.1 m)
EF0	Trained storm spotters reported a brief tornado. Debris was scattered.						
EF0	S of Groton	Brown	SD	45.391°N 98.0978°W	23:05–23:06	0.1 mi (0.16 km)	10 yd (9.1 m)
EF0	Trained storm spotters reported a brief tornado.						
EF0	SSW of Hancock	Stevens	MN	45.4433°N 95.8244°W	23:45–23:47	1.54 mi (2.48 km)	35 yd (32 m)
EF0	Brief tornado was confirmed by video and caused no damage.						
EF1	SW of Cyrus	Stevens	MN	45.5672°N 95.7975°W	23:56–00:04	2.96 mi (4.76 km)	300 yd (270 m)
EF1	Tornado remained over Long Lake for much of its life, only damaging trees near the end of its path.						
EF0	S of Hoffman	Grant	MN	45.79°N 95.8°W	00:28–00:29	0.45 mi (0.72 km)	75 yd (69 m)
EF0	Two storm chaser groups observed a tornado.						
EF1	SE of Holmquist	Day	SD	45.3122°N 97.6343°W	00:29–00:30	0.21 mi (0.34 km)	40 yd (37 m)
EF1	A farm shed was destroyed, and numerous trees were snapped or uprooted in a shelter belt.						
EF0	SE of Eden	Marshall	SD	45.595°N 97.374°W	00:55–00:56	0.12 mi (0.19 km)	50 yd (46 m)
EF0	A barn had its entire roof collapsed, with debris lofted about 500 ft (170 yd). A second outbuilding sustained minor roof damage. Minor tree and house siding damage was noted.						
EF1	WSW of New Effington	Roberts	SD	45.8477°N 96.9548°W	01:20–01:23	0.36 mi (0.58 km)	100 yd (91 m)
EF1	Many trees were snapped at their trunks or uprooted.						
EF0	N of New Effington	Roberts	SD	45.8851°N 96.9201°W	01:25–01:26	0.13 mi (0.21 km)	90 yd (82 m)
EF0	A tree grove was damaged, with multiple trees snapped or uprooted at the trunk.						
EF1	N of Clinton	Big Stone	MN	45.5128°N 96.4359°W	01:27–01:30	0.25 mi (0.40 km)	170 yd (160 m)
EF1	A tornado crossed a farmstead, ripping over half the tin roof from the house and causing considerable damage to its siding. A machine shed was completely destroyed while a second had damage to its southward-facing walls; it also loft over half the roof. A third machine shed sustained extensive damage to its west-facing walls and over half its roof. An empty grain bin was removed from its cement base, with the attached auger toppled. Another grain bin was dented at the top. A power pole was snapped while others were downed. Widespread tree damage was observed. A small area of corn crop was razed to the ground.						
EF1	NW of Johnson	Traverse	MN	45.6005°N 96.3251°W	01:30–01:33	0.07 mi (0.11 km)	50 yd (46 m)
EF1	A garage's door and siding sustained minor damage. Multiple trees were snapped and uprooted.						

=== June 14 event ===
List of confirmed tornadoes – Wednesday, June 14, 2017
EF#	Location	County / Parish	State	Start Coord.	Time (UTC)	Path length	Max width
EF0	Kissimmee	Osceola	FL	28.2772°N 81.4182°W	17:30–17:31	0.01 mi (0.016 km)	10 yd (9.1 m)
EF0	A sheriff observed a brief landspout tornado.						
EF0	NE of Gresham	Shawano	WI	44.869°N 88.749°W	18:47	0.1 mi (0.16 km)	25 yd (23 m)
EF0	A brief tornado was confirmed by video.						
EF1	NE of Wild Rose	Waushara	WI	44.196°N 89.207°W	19:49–19:52	2.78 mi (4.47 km)	100 yd (91 m)
EF1	Over 100 pine trees were snapped, several of which fell on and inflicted damage to homes.						
EF1	E of Fox Crossing	Winnebago, Outagamie	WI	44.236°N 88.423°W	20:28–20:37	8.02 mi (12.91 km)	125 yd (114 m)
EF1	Numerous trees were snapped or uprooted, and several structures sustained damage.						
EF0	SE of Mackville	Outagamie	WI	44.31°N 88.44°W	20:30–20:34	2.83 mi (4.55 km)	50 yd (46 m)
EF0	A brief tornado caused only minor tree damage.						
EF0	NE of Bear Creek	Outagamie	WI	44.5479°N 88.6628°W	20:31–20:38	3.99 mi (6.42 km)	50 yd (46 m)
EF0	Several trees in saturated soil were uprooted, and small limbs were broken off about a dozen more. A barn's metal roof was ripped off and another barn roof collapsed.						
EF1	W of Nichols	Outagamie, Shawano	WI	44.571°N 88.509°W	20:40–20:45	3.98 mi (6.41 km)	100 yd (91 m)
EF1	Shingles and siding were ripped from a home. One detached garage or outbuilding was swept off its foundation; a second was collapsed, with its walls falling outward. Pine trees were downed and snapped.						
EF1	NE of Nichols	Shawano	WI	44.5908°N 88.4033°W	20:45–20:51	5.08 mi (8.18 km)	75 yd (69 m)
EF1	A wood and sheet-metal pole barn was heavily damaged. A mobile home was destroyed after tumbling off its block foundation, with portions of the home carried nearly a quarter mile downwind. Several trees were snapped or uprooted.						
EF1	SW of Pulaski	Shawano	WI	44.647°N 88.287°W	20:51–20:59	5.8 mi (9.3 km)	150 yd (140 m)
EF1	One barn was destroyed, two garages were damaged, and dozens of trees were snapped or uprooted.						
EF0	SW of Morrison	Brown	WI	44.29°N 88°W	20:53–20:55	1.21 mi (1.95 km)	50 yd (46 m)
EF0	A tornado caused minor tree damage.						
EF0	SW of Angelica	Shawano	WI	44.646°N 88.363°W	20:53–20:55	3.05 mi (4.91 km)	50 yd (46 m)
EF0	One old barn was heavily damaged while a second had most of its roof blown off. An outbuilding had a portion of its roof removed. A nearby home sustained roof damage and had its garage door partially collapsed inward.						

=== June 16 event ===
List of confirmed tornadoes – Friday, June 16, 2017
EF#	Location	County / Parish	State	Start Coord.	Time (UTC)	Path length	Max width
EF0	N of Meadow Grove	Pierce	NE	42.14°N 97.75°W	21:47	0.5 mi (0.80 km)	25 yd (23 m)
EF0	A trained storm spotter reported a brief tornado touchdown.						
EF1	SE of Hoskins	Wayne, Stanton	NE	42.1115°N 97.2132°W	22:32–22:42	2.11 mi (3.40 km)	100 yd (91 m)
EF1	Several sheds and barns were flattened, and a grain bin was damaged.						
EF0	NNE of Madison	Madison	NE	41.8661°N 97.4221°W	22:50–22:56	4.52 mi (7.27 km)	25 yd (23 m)
EF0	Large tree limbs were broken.						
EF1	SSE of Winslow	Dodge	NE	41.595°N 96.4994°W	00:10–00:15	1.44 mi (2.32 km)	50 yd (46 m)
EF1	Two center pivot irrigation systems were flipped.						
EF2	Southern Bellevue, NE to W of Glenwood, IA	Sarpy, Mills	NE, IA	41.0994°N 95.9611°W	01:05–01:18	9.3 mi (15.0 km)	250 yd (230 m)
EF2	This rain-wrapped, high-end EF2 tornado moved through the multiple subdivisions in the southern part of Bellevue. Extensive tree and roof damage occurred along much of the path, with the most severe damage occurring in the Hyda Hills subdivision, where homes had roofs torn off and exterior walls collapsed. In Iowa, several businesses sustained significant roof damage, tree damage occurred, and trailers were damaged or overturned at a trailer campground.						
EF1	Offutt Air Force Base to NW of Glenwood, IA	Sarpy, Mills	NE, IA	41.1277°N 95.9374°W	01:08–01:13	6.65 mi (10.70 km)	300 yd (270 m)
EF1	A tornado tracked through Offutt Air Force Base, snapping or uprooting numerous trees, damaging the roofs of several buildings, and moving aircraft from their original positions. In Iowa, several outbuildings and barns were damaged or destroyed on a farmstead, with the farm house sustaining roof damage. A center pivot irrigation system was tipped over as well.						
EF0	NE of Lincoln	Lancaster	NE	40.8346°N 96.6547°W	01:40–01:41	0.5 mi (0.80 km)	20 yd (18 m)
EF0	Video confirmed a brief tornado.						
EF1	ESE of New Market	Taylor	IA	40.7198°N 94.8595°W	02:35–02:37	1.32 mi (2.12 km)	40 yd (37 m)
EF1	A hoop building on a farm was destroyed, two empty grain bins were pushed off their foundations, and trees were damaged.						
EF0	NE of Beatrice	Gage	NE	40.3289°N 96.7085°W	02:39–02:41	0.94 mi (1.51 km)	40 yd (37 m)
EF0	An empty grain bin was destroyed on one farm, and a 20–40 yd (18–37 m) swath of crops were destroyed.						
EF1	W of Beattie	Marshall	KS	39.8669°N 96.4663°W	04:01–04:05	2.63 mi (4.23 km)	100 yd (91 m)
EF1	Several outbuildings were destroyed, trees were downed, and power lines were toppled.						
EF1	Pascagoula	Jackson	MS	30.3617°N 88.5556°W	04:18–04:22	2.68 mi (4.31 km)	100 yd (91 m)
EF1	A CrossFit location sustained major structural damage, the roofs of other buildings sustained lesser damage, and trees limbs were snapped.						

=== June 17 event ===
List of confirmed tornadoes – Saturday, June 17, 2017
EF#	Location	County / Parish	State	Start Coord.	Time (UTC)	Path length	Max width
EF0	NW of Odessa	Lafayette	MO	39.0678°N 94.0939°W	02:47–02:53	4.75 mi (7.64 km)	50 yd (46 m)
EF0	The shingles were lifted off a house, and trees were damaged.						

=== June 18 event ===
List of confirmed tornadoes – Sunday, June 18, 2017
EF#	Location	County / Parish	State	Start Coord.	Time (UTC)	Path length	Max width
EF0	SE of Rankin	Upton	TX	31.1586°N 101.8282°W	00:05–00:13	6.06 mi (9.75 km)	200 yd (180 m)
EF0	Law enforcement reported a tornado over open country.						
EF0	NE of Big Lake	Reagan	TX	31.2614°N 101.3982°W	01:00–01:03	1.75 mi (2.82 km)	100 yd (91 m)
EF0	The public reported a brief landspout tornado in open country.						
EF0	N of Big Lake	Reagan	TX	31.4895°N 101.47°W	01:05–01:08	2.04 mi (3.28 km)	150 yd (140 m)
EF0	Law enforcement reported a brief landspout tornado in an open field.						

=== June 19 event ===
List of confirmed tornadoes – Monday, June 19, 2017
EF#	Location	County / Parish	State	Start Coord.	Time (UTC)	Path length	Max width
EF0	East Smithfield	Bradford	PA	41.8641°N 76.6335°W	16:20–16:22	1.05 mi (1.69 km)	250 yd (230 m)
EF0	A barn lost part of its roof and many trees were downed in town, with several damaging homes or vehicles.						
EF0	W of Shartlesville	Berks	PA	40.51°N 76.13°W	18:36–18:38	2.1 mi (3.4 km)	50 yd (46 m)
EF0	Several large trees were snapped and uprooted.						
EF0	Four Corners	Montgomery	MD	39.0274°N 77.0176°W	19:49–19:50	0.22 mi (0.35 km)	100 yd (91 m)
EF0	Several trees were snapped or downed; fallen trees damaged homes, vehicles, and power lines.						
EF0	Shippenville	Clarion	PA	41.304°N 79.520°W	21:52–21:53	0.75 mi (1.21 km)	60 yd (55 m)
EF0	Outbuildings and barns with sheet metal roofs sustained damage. Numerous trees were snapped or uprooted.						
EF0	SE of Greenwood	Sussex	DE	38.79°N 75.58°W	23:15–23:16	0.6 mi (0.97 km)	200 yd (180 m)
EF0	A couple of small barns were destroyed on a farm. Several trees were snapped or downed, causing damage to nearby power poles and wires. A large unoccupied chicken coop was lifted and shifted off its foundation, and metal roof panels were twisted. A couple sections of large central pivot irrigation systems were tipped onto their sides.						

=== June 20 event ===
List of confirmed tornadoes – Tuesday, June 20, 2017
EF#	Location	County / Parish	State	Start Coord.	Time (UTC)	Path length	Max width
EF0	St. George Island	Franklin	FL	29.6393°N 84.9077°W	14:15–14:20	0.39 mi (0.63 km)	50 yd (46 m)
EF0	Three well-built coastal homes sustained minor roof damage. Trees suffered minor damage as well.						

=== June 21 event ===
Events in the southeastern United States were associated with Tropical Storm Cindy.

List of confirmed tornadoes – Wednesday, June 21, 2017
EF#	Location	County / Parish	State	Start Coord.	Time (UTC)	Path length	Max width
EF0	Fort Walton Beach	Okaloosa	FL	30.4122°N 86.5920°W	11:18–11:20	2.52 mi (4.06 km)	75 yd (69 m)
EF0	A couple of home roofs, a baseball field, and trees were damaged.						
EF0	W of Biloxi	Harrison	MS	30.391°N 88.971°W	13:20–13:22	5.48 mi (8.82 km)	50 yd (46 m)
EF0	Trees, power lines, and fences were damaged. A single window was broken.						
EF0	N of Foley	Baldwin	AL	30.4655°N 87.6758°W	20:02–20:03	0.1 mi (0.16 km)	25 yd (23 m)
EF0	A public video captured a brief tornado touchdown.						
EF0	E of Riverview	Escambia	AL	31.0563°N 86.8075°W	20:08–20:09	0.85 mi (1.37 km)	25 yd (23 m)
EF0	Tree damage was observed in the Conecuh National Forest.						
EF0	N of Breckenridge	Wilkin	MN	46.34°N 96.54°W	23:24–23:25	0.47 mi (0.76 km)	75 yd (69 m)
EF0	A tornado photographed and videoed produced a sizable dust cloud at times.						
EF0	NE of Foxhome	Wilkin	MN	46.3°N 96.29°W	23:39–23:42	1.28 mi (2.06 km)	100 yd (91 m)
EF0	A tornado was witnessed by multiple people.						
EF1	SW of Opp	Covington	AL	31.2252°N 86.3078°W	23:57–00:08	4.84 mi (7.79 km)	75 yd (69 m)
EF1	A residence lost its roof over an open door garage while a second suffered minor roof damage. Numerous trees were damaged and uprooted.						
EF0	E of Whatley	Clarke	AL	31.6501°N 87.6558°W	01:35–01:36	0.13 mi (0.21 km)	25 yd (23 m)
EF0	About 100 to 150 pine trees were damaged.						

=== June 22 event ===
Events were associated with Tropical Storm Cindy.

List of confirmed tornadoes – Thursday, June 22, 2017
EF#	Location	County / Parish	State	Start Coord.	Time (UTC)	Path length	Max width
EF1	Lipscomb to Fairfield to western Birmingham	Jefferson	AL	33.4282°N 86.9397°W	17:21–17:38	8.29 mi (13.34 km)	255 yd (233 m)
EF1	This high-end EF1 tornado caused considerable damage in the Birmingham area. Many trees were snapped or uprooted, some of which resulted in severe structural damage. An oil change business and a liquor store were largely destroyed, with the roofs removed and exterior walls collapsed. A strip mall was heavily damaged, and a tire shop sustained less severe damage. Several vehicles had windows blown out at a Honda dealership as well. The tornado was initially rated EF2, though further analysis revealed that the destroyed structures were of poor construction or had open bay doors that allowed tornadic winds into the structure. The overall context was also not consistent with a strong tornado, and the rating was subsequently decreased to EF1. Four people were injured.						
EF0	NE of Marvel	Shelby	AL	33.1834°N 86.9721°W	19:42–19:43	0.27 mi (0.43 km)	50 yd (46 m)
EF0	Trees were snapped or uprooted.						

=== June 23 event ===
Events were associated with Tropical Storm Cindy.

List of confirmed tornadoes – Friday, June 23, 2017
EF#	Location	County / Parish	State	Start Coord.	Time (UTC)	Path length	Max width
EF1	N of Lone Pine	Washington	PA	40.104°N 80.171°W	19:21–19:23	2.97 mi (4.78 km)	250 yd (230 m)
EF1	Many large trees were snapped and several homes had their shingles ripped off. A detached garage had a portion of its roof uplifted, while a large porch roof was ripped off a house. Deck furniture was lofted and thrown long distances.						
EF1	SE of Hodgenville	LaRue	KY	37.5285°N 85.7443°W	21:37–21:45	5.1 mi (8.2 km)	75 yd (69 m)
EF1	Several trees were damaged at the Abraham Lincoln Birthplace National Historical Park and along the tornado's path; some fell on a home and vehicle. Two barns were destroyed while a third had its roof damaged.						
EF0	SSE of Cheat Lake	Monongalia	WV	39.660°N 79.853°W	21:55–21:56	0.27 mi (0.43 km)	200 yd (180 m)
EF0	Several docks and two pontoon boats were thrown across the Lakeside Marina, with the two boats landing upside down near the Crab Shack. Several of the dock canopies were strewn around, including one that was wrapped around power lines. Trees were damaged. A small building had its roof ripped off.						
EF1	S of Saint Francis	Marion	KY	37.6177°N 85.4359°W	22:05–22:07	2.1 mi (3.4 km)	100 yd (91 m)
EF1	The trunks of several large trees were snapped. Several outbuildings were damaged, and multiple streaks of intense winds were documented in corn fields by a drone. A tobacco barn was flattened.						
EF1	S of Morgantown	Monongalia	WV	39.495°N 79.930°W	23:47–23:48	0.13 mi (0.21 km)	47 yd (43 m)
EF1	Several dozen trees were snapped or uprooted.						
EF1	ESE of Salem	Harrison	WV	39.2638°N 80.4799°W	23:58–00:04	4.4 mi (7.1 km)	400 yd (370 m)
EF1	Numerous trees were snapped and uprooted. A barn was collapsed and partially shifted off its foundation. A two-story home suffered partial wall failure on its eastern side. Two wooden utility poles were snapped, a building had a small portion of its roof removed, and a small SUV was flipped.						

=== June 24 event ===
Events were associated with Tropical Storm Cindy.

List of confirmed tornadoes – Saturday, June 24, 2017
EF#	Location	County / Parish	State	Start Coord.	Time (UTC)	Path length	Max width
EF0	Fort Plains	Monmouth	NJ	40.187°N 74.252°W	12:21–12:23	0.5 mi (0.80 km)	40 yd (37 m)
EF0	Trees were snapped and uprooted in the parking lot of a Home Depot, and metal roofing was removed from a Chase Bank. A large metal container for clothing donations was overturned, and three parked cars were pushed into one another. An ice cream shop sustained roof and siding damage, while a fence was downed on the property too. Cloth draping on a nearby billboard sign was ripped off.						
EF0	ENE of Oak Glen	Monmouth	NJ	40.172°N 74.183°W	12:27–12:28	0.3 mi (0.48 km)	25 yd (23 m)
EF0	Numerous trees were snapped or uprooted near a soccer field, and several large metal trash cans were knocked over.						

=== June 25 event ===
List of confirmed tornadoes – Sunday, June 25, 2017
EF#	Location	County / Parish	State	Start Coord.	Time (UTC)	Path length	Max width
EF0	W of Walsh	Baca	CO	37.4167°N 102.3206°W	21:25–21:45	4.37 mi (7.03 km)	200 yd (180 m)
EF0	A multi-vortex tornado damaged some fencing but otherwise remained over fields.						
EF0	N of Keyes	Cimarron	OK	36.89°N 102.24°W	23:08	0.1 mi (0.16 km)	10 yd (9.1 m)
EF0	Storm chasers photographed a weak and brief tornado.						
EF0	ENE of Boise City	Cimarron	OK	36.76°N 102.38°W	23:33	0.1 mi (0.16 km)	10 yd (9.1 m)
EF0	Law enforcement reported a tornado.						

=== June 26 event ===
List of confirmed tornadoes – Monday, June 26, 2017
EF#	Location	County / Parish	State	Start Coord.	Time (UTC)	Path length	Max width
EF0	NNE of Salina	Saline	KS	38.8969°N 97.5644°W	23:20–23:22	6.87 mi (11.06 km)	50 yd (46 m)
EF0	Tractor trailers were flipped.						

=== June 28 event ===
List of confirmed tornadoes – Wednesday, June 28, 2017
EF#	Location	County / Parish	State	Start Coord.	Time (UTC)	Path length	Max width
EF2	E of Sidney	Fremont	IA	40.7567°N 95.5628°W	20:46–20:59	3.7 mi (6.0 km)	135 yd (123 m)
EF2	Corn crops and sheds were flattened, trees were snapped and uprooted, grain bins were destroyed, and the roof was blown off a rural home.						
EF0	S of Stuart	Adair	IA	41.3985°N 94.519°W	20:57–21:30	14.93 mi (24.03 km)	100 yd (91 m)
EF0	A few outbuildings and trees sustained minor damage.						
EF1	E of Shenandoah	Page	IA	40.7518°N 95.2898°W	21:21–21:28	2.12 mi (3.41 km)	75 yd (69 m)
EF1	Corn crops were flattened and tree trunks were snapped.						
EF1	NW of Carbon	Adams	IA	41.0626°N 94.8906°W	21:21–21:30	3.78 mi (6.08 km)	100 yd (91 m)
EF1	Trees were damaged, including a few that had their trunks completely snapped.						
EF1	N of Ellsworth to SSW of Spring Valley	Pierce	WI	44.8244°N 92.4892°W	21:25–21:49	11.35 mi (18.27 km)	700 yd (640 m)
EF1	Several homes sustained roof damage; a truck was pulled out of a garage and flipped onto its side at one location. Several outbuildings or barns were damaged or destroyed. One person was injured.						
EF0	NNW of Prescott	Adams	IA	41.0779°N 94.6763°W	21:43–21:46	1.94 mi (3.12 km)	30 yd (27 m)
EF0	Large tree branches were broken.						
EF1	ESE of Greenfield	Adair, Madison	IA	41.2794°N 94.342°W	21:45–22:00	7.59 mi (12.21 km)	100 yd (91 m)
EF1	Tree tops were sheared off, and outbuildings sustained minor damage.						
EF1	SW of Siren	Burnett	WI	45.762°N 92.426°W	21:49–21:56	2.2 mi (3.5 km)	180 yd (160 m)
EF1	A trampoline was lofted, and sections of a metal pole barn roof were pulled back. Stands of trees were bent or broken, and a crop of corn saw its leaves and stalks scoured.						
EF2	S of Bedford	Taylor	IA	40.5851°N 94.7771°W	22:05–22:35	7 mi (11 km)	1,000 yd (910 m)
EF2	A home sustained minor damage and an old outbuilding was nearly destroyed. Trees and crops were damaged.						
EF1	SSE of Sandyville to SW of Otley	Warren, Marion	IA	41.3348°N 93.3588°W	22:54–23:26	17.8 mi (28.6 km)	500 yd (460 m)
EF1	Trees were topped or uprooted. Multiple power poles were snapped, and several homes and outbuildings sustained EF1 damage.						
EF0	E of New Virginia	Warren	IA	41.184°N 93.6865°W	23:18–23:19	0.51 mi (0.82 km)	25 yd (23 m)
EF0	An emergency manager observed a tornado over open field.						
EF0	WSW of Viola	Olmsted	MN	44.0561°N 92.3083°W	23:22	0.01 mi (0.016 km)	25 yd (23 m)
EF0	Amateur radio storm spotters observed a brief tornado.						
EF2	Southern Central City to NE Prairieburg	Linn, Jones	IA	42.1919°N 91.5271°W	23:38–00:01	11.69 mi (18.81 km)	200 yd (180 m)
EF2	This strong tornado first touched down at the south edge of Central City before moving northeast. Just outside of Prairieburg, a woman was injured when a garage collapsed onto her. The most intense damage occurred within Prairieburg, where trees were snapped, the town's grain elevator was severely damaged, a mobile home was lofted and completely destroyed, another mobile home was severely damaged, and other structures were damaged as well. A horse barn was destroyed at the east edge of down, killing a horse and injuring two others. Past Prairieburg, the tornado destroyed a large hog building, killing several hogs.						
EF0	N of Dover	Olmsted	MN	43.9989°N 92.1358°W	23:42–23:44	0.42 mi (0.68 km)	25 yd (23 m)
EF0	Corn was flattened and large tree branches were broken.						
EF1	S of Martinsville	Gentry, Harrison	MO	40.286°N 94.3311°W	23:48–00:14	16.37 mi (26.34 km)	75 yd (69 m)
EF1	Corn was flattened and large tree branches were broken.						
EF1	SSW of Monticello	Green	WI	42.703°N 89.621°W	23:55–23:58	0.57 mi (0.92 km)	150 yd (140 m)
EF1	Two buildings at Faith Engineering sustained roof damage and had windows broken. A trailer was flipped, multiple trees were snapped or uprooted, and a dumpster was blown across a highway.						
EF1	S of Monticello	Green	WI	42.666°N 89.621°W	23:55–00:01	2.21 mi (3.56 km)	300 yd (270 m)
EF1	A barn and a pole shed were destroyed, four homes sustained damage, and four power poles were snapped. Numerous trees were snapped or uprooted, and a camper was rolled into a pond.						
EF0	ESE of Chester	Olmsted	MN	43.9980°N 92.3098°W	00:07–00:12	0.48 mi (0.77 km)	25 yd (23 m)
EF0	Minor tree damage was reported by television media.						
EF2	NNE of Monticello	Jones, Delaware	IA	42.2906°N 91.1883°W	00:14–00:18	2.5 mi (4.0 km)	30 yd (27 m)
EF2	Two grain bins and seven outbuildings were destroyed. Two garages had their doors blown in, and five wooden power poles were snapped. Four sections of a grain bin roof were folded into a narrow, cone-shaped missile that slammed into a garage attic 100 yards away.						
EF0	SE of Vinton	Benton	IA	42.1535°N 91.9884°W	00:26	0.02 mi (0.032 km)	10 yd (9.1 m)
EF0	Brief touchdown captured on video by a citizen damaged two trees.						
EF0	W of Janesville	Rock	WI	42.6865°N 89.0993°W	00:38–00:40	0.79 mi (1.27 km)	100 yd (91 m)
EF0	Two farm buildings sustained roof damage, a tree was uprooted, and many large tree branches were broken.						
EF1	SW of Oxford Junction	Jones	IA	41.9657°N 90.9954°W	00:56–01:00	2 mi (3.2 km)	15 yd (14 m)
EF1	Two unanchored mobile homes were destroyed, a machine shed was damaged, and a camper was overturned.						
EF1	SSE of Cherry Valley	Winnebago	IL	42.211°N 88.948°W	01:14–01:22	5.86 mi (9.43 km)	200 yd (180 m)
EF1	Damage was largely confined to trees, but some minor property damage occurred.						
EF1	SE of Belvidere	Boone	IL	42.208°N 88.810°W	01:23–01:25	1.64 mi (2.64 km)	100 yd (91 m)
EF1	Damage was largely confined to trees, but some minor property damage occurred.						
EF0	S of Maryville	Nodaway	MO	40.2829°N 94.8887°W	01:31–01:33	1.31 mi (2.11 km)	25 yd (23 m)
EF0	Small tree limbs were broken.						
EF0	W of Stanberry	Gentry	MO	40.2226°N 94.5972°W	01:50–01:52	1.44 mi (2.32 km)	25 yd (23 m)
EF0	Large tree branches were broken.						

=== June 29 event ===
List of confirmed tornadoes – Thursday, June 29, 2017
EF#	Location	County / Parish	State	Start Coord.	Time (UTC)	Path length	Max width
EF1	NNE of Fordyce	Cedar	NE	42.7521°N 97.4062°W	22:45–23:11	14.4 mi (23.2 km)	150 yd (140 m)
EF1	Trees were downed, minor structural damage was inflicted a home, and a barn was destroyed on a farmstead. A center pivot irrigation system was flipped over and a second home sustained minor roof damage.						

=== June 30 event ===
List of confirmed tornadoes – Friday, June 30, 2017
EF#	Location	County / Parish	State	Start Coord.	Time (UTC)	Path length	Max width
EF1	Broadalbin	Fulton	NY	43.025°N 74.164°W	19:49–19:50	0.25 mi (0.40 km)	50 yd (46 m)
EF1	A pole barn was destroyed, several trees were snapped and tossed, and a destroyed carport was tossed into a tree. Garage doors were blown in, and siding and shingles were ripped off homes.						
EF0	SW of Verona	Oneida	NY	43.0994°N 75.6188°W	20:45–20:46	1.47 mi (2.37 km)	125 yd (114 m)
EF0	A dozen trees and several power poles were downed. A few homes sustained damage from fallen trees or had shingles ripped off.						
EF1	SE of Utica	Herkimer	NY	43.026°N 75.21°W	21:28–21:29	0.6 mi (0.97 km)	150 yd (140 m)
EF1	A stable was partially destroyed, with debris tossed 700 yd (640 m) onto a golf course. Numerous trees were snapped or uprooted, and a home sustained siding damage.						
EF0	SSW of Lee	Allegan	MI	42.43°N 86.09°W	01:31–01:32	0.2 mi (0.32 km)	25 yd (23 m)
EF0	The local fire department reported a brief landspout tornado. No damage occurred.						

== July ==
Confirmed tornadoes by Enhanced Fujita rating
EFU	EF0	EF1	EF2	EF3	EF4	EF5	Total
3	52	23	5	0	0	0	83

=== July 1 event ===
List of confirmed tornadoes – Saturday, July 1, 2017
EF#	Location	County / Parish	State	Start Coord.	Time (UTC)	Path length	Max width
EF0	Sebago Lake	Cumberland	ME	43.8504°N 70.6332°W	18:20–18:34	3.42 mi (5.50 km)	50 yd (46 m)
EF0	A pontoon boat was flipped, and a fence sustained minor damage.						
EF1	W of Bridgton	Cumberland	ME	44.0478°N 70.8161°W	20:42–20:46	1.53 mi (2.46 km)	250 yd (230 m)
EF1	Numerous trees were snapped or uprooted and multiple power poles were snapped.						
EF1	N of Denmark	Oxford	ME	44.03°N 70.80°W	22:09–22:10	0.32 mi (0.51 km)	200 yd (180 m)
EF1	Dozens of trees were snapped or uprooted along the southwestern shore of Moose Pond. The tornado may have crossed the pond and continued farther over land; however, surveys were unable to confirm this.						
EF1	Bridgton	Cumberland	ME	44.0597°N 70.718°W	22:14–22:25	2.48 mi (3.99 km)	200 yd (180 m)
EF1	This high-end EF1 tornado struck Bridgton directly. Numerous large trees up to 2 ft (0.61 m) in diameter were snapped or uprooted, some of which fell onto structures and vehicles; one injury occurred when a person was cut by glass. A campground sustained heavy damage.						
EF0	NW of Otisfield	Oxford	ME	44.0964°N 70.6009°W	22:31–22:36	2.54 mi (4.09 km)	75 yd (69 m)
EF0	A weak tornado downed multiple trees and power lines.						

=== July 3 event ===
List of confirmed tornadoes – Monday, July 3, 2017
EF#	Location	County / Parish	State	Start Coord.	Time (UTC)	Path length	Max width
EF1	Jonesboro	Craighead	AR	35.8333°N 90.701°W	11:28–11:29	0.09 mi (0.14 km)	75 yd (69 m)
EF1	A brief tornado caused significant roof damage to an apartment complex. Windows were blown out, and pieces of fencing and siding debris were lofted and scattered throughout the area.						
EF0	S of Broadview	Curry	NM	34.73°N 103.21°W	21:30–21:45	0.82 mi (1.32 km)	30 yd (27 m)
EF0	Multiple sources reported a well-developed landspout that caused no damage.						
EF0	WNW of Newbern	Dyer	TN	36.1163°N 89.2843°W	22:20–22:21	0.31 mi (0.50 km)	75 yd (69 m)
EF0	Video confirmation of a tornado; no damage reported.						

=== July 5 event ===
List of confirmed tornadoes – Wednesday, July 5, 2017
EF#	Location	County / Parish	State	Start Coord.	Time (UTC)	Path length	Max width
EF1	W of Middle Fork	Carroll	TN	35.8664°N 88.5524°W	23:58–00:02	1.54 mi (2.48 km)	200 yd (180 m)
EF1	Widespread tree damage was observed. Approximately 15 to 20 buildings and outbuildings sustained damage, primarily to their roofs.						
EF0	NW of McEwen	Humphreys	TN	36.16°N 87.68°W	01:58–02:09	3.9 mi (6.3 km)	75 yd (69 m)
EF0	A shed was overturned and several trees were snapped and uprooted in a convergent pattern, with a few falling onto a home. Near Highway 231, more trees were blown over. A home lost several shingles, a door was blown off of an outbuilding, and more trees were downed before the tornado finally lifted. This was the first tornado to occur in Humphreys County in the month of July since official records began in 1950.						
EF0	Charles Town	Jefferson	WV	39.297°N 77.844°W	02:14–02:15	0.26 mi (0.42 km)	30 yd (27 m)
EF0	The entrance sign of a shopping center was damaged. At a horse racing facility in town, the roofs of three barns and the door to a fourth were damaged, and one barn had a large portion of its roof ripped off. Debris was tossed into power lines and snapped a telephone pole. Fencing was damaged, and wooden 2x4s were lofted and thrown.						

=== July 6 event ===
List of confirmed tornadoes – Thursday, July 6, 2017
EF#	Location	County / Parish	State	Start Coord.	Time (UTC)	Path length	Max width
EF1	SSE of Atikokan, ON to NNE of Sawbill Landing, MN	Rainy River (ON), Lake (MN)	ON, MN	48.2883°N 81.2289°W	19:30–19:52	12.24 mi (19.70 km)	558 yd (510 m)
EF1	A strong EF2 tornado touched down in the southeastern area of the Quetico Provincial Park in Canada. Numerous trees were downed as the tornado moved southeast, eventually crossing the international border into the United States as an EF1 tornado. Tree damage continued into Boundary Waters Canoe Area before dissipating. This tornado was not fully surveyed until 2020.						
EF0	NNE of Placitas	Sandoval	NM	35.4284°N 106.3902°W	21:30–21:32	0.04 mi (0.064 km)	20 yd (18 m)
EF0	Broadcast media reported a tornado.						

=== July 7 event ===
List of confirmed tornadoes – Friday, July 7, 2017
EF#	Location	County / Parish	State	Start Coord.	Time (UTC)	Path length	Max width
EF0	NE of Brownsville	Cameron	TX	25.98°N 97.36°W	17:30–17:31	0.1 mi (0.16 km)	1 yd (0.91 m)
EF0	The public reported a brief landspout tornado. No damage occurred.						
EF0	Meadow Woods	Orange	FL	28.3917°N 81.3403°W	00:00	0.05 mi (0.080 km)	15 yd (14 m)
EF0	A brief tornado or landspout was observed by Air Traffic Control at Orlando International Airport. No damage occurred.						
EF0	Buena Ventura Lakes	Osceola	FL	28.3171°N 81.3636°W	00:29–00:32	0.69 mi (1.11 km)	25 yd (23 m)
EF0	Several residences sustained minor shingle damage, and carports and pool screen enclosures were damaged. A large mango tree fell on a home, causing damage to its roof.						

=== July 8 event ===
List of confirmed tornadoes – Saturday, July 8, 2017
EF#	Location	County / Parish	State	Start Coord.	Time (UTC)	Path length	Max width
EFU	SSW of Hurricane	Washington	UT	37.0755°N 113.3219°W	00:20	0.05 mi (0.080 km)	1 yd (0.91 m)
EFU	A member of the public photographed a brief tornado.						

=== July 9 event ===
List of confirmed tornadoes – Sunday, July 9, 2017
EF#	Location	County / Parish	State	Start Coord.	Time (UTC)	Path length	Max width
EF0	N of Courtland	Nicollet	MN	44.3147°N 94.3519°W	02:37–02:41	1.32 mi (2.12 km)	50 yd (46 m)
EF0	Sheds and other outbuildings were damaged across two farms. Crops were damaged and some trees were toppled.						
EF1	WSW of Judson	Blue Earth	MN	44.1725°N 94.2619°W	03:30–03:38	2.68 mi (4.31 km)	100 yd (91 m)
EF1	Two old barns were demolished, an old spruce tree was snapped, and a chimney was knocked down. Hundreds of acres of crops were damaged, with corn flattened and some stalks snapped at the base.						

=== July 10 event ===
List of confirmed tornadoes – Monday, July 10, 2017
EF#	Location	County / Parish	State	Start Coord.	Time (UTC)	Path length	Max width
EFU	SW of Kill Devil Hills	Dare	NC	36.00°N 75.72°W	10:50	—N/a	—N/a
EFU	One of four waterspouts that formed over Albemarle Sound; this was the only one to move onshore. One home sustained minor roof damage.						
EFU	WNW of Hatch	Garfield	UT	37.7042°N 112.5552°W	18:00	0.05 mi (0.080 km)	1 yd (0.91 m)
EFU	A member of the public photographed a brief tornado.						
EF0	NNE of Fombell	Beaver, Butler	PA	40.828°N 80.189°W	19:57–20:01	3.18 mi (5.12 km)	75 yd (69 m)
EF0	A weak tornado damaged trees and flattened corn stalks.						
EF0	S of Princeville	Peoria	IL	40.90°N 89.76°W	22:45–22:53	1.6 mi (2.6 km)	50 yd (46 m)
EF0	An emergency manager reported a brief touchdown in a field.						
EF0	W of Chester	Meigs	OH	39.0769°N 81.945°W	23:35–23:36	0.44 mi (0.71 km)	50 yd (46 m)
EF0	A small tin shed was lifted from its foundation and destroyed, and several trees were snapped or uprooted; one home sustained minor damage from a fallen tree.						
EF1	SE of Burrows to SW of Walton	Carroll, Cass	IN	40.6413°N 86.3959°W	23:53–00:06	3.84 mi (6.18 km)	200 yd (180 m)
EF1	Crops and trees sustained damage along the path of this tornado. An RV was lifted off of the ground and destroyed near a county road, and a few barns and homes sustained minor roof damage.						
EF1	NE of Denver to SW of Roann	Miami	IN	40.8819°N 86.0083°W	23:58–00:06	2.95 mi (4.75 km)	100 yd (91 m)
EF1	Some trees were snapped or uprooted, crops were damaged, and a poorly anchored, older barn was destroyed.						
EF0	W of Rockford	Mercer	OH	40.7126°N 84.7948°W	00:14–00:31	6.35 mi (10.22 km)	150 yd (140 m)
EF0	Trees, crops, and the roofs of a few homes were damaged. An outbuilding was destroyed.						

=== July 11 event ===
List of confirmed tornadoes – Tuesday, July 11, 2017
EF#	Location	County / Parish	State	Start Coord.	Time (UTC)	Path length	Max width
EF0	E of Rocklake	Towner	ND	48.79°N 99.16°W	22:16–22:20	2 mi (3.2 km)	150 yd (140 m)
EF0	A tornado was observed by storm spotters over open country.						
EF1	NE of Williamsburg	Iowa	IA	41.6977°N 91.9896°W	22:35–22:54	4.58 mi (7.37 km)	60 yd (55 m)
EF1	Trees and crops were damaged. Two homes sustained damage to their windows and siding. One farm outbuilding lost a portion of its roof while a second was partially destroyed.						
EF1	W of Minto	Walsh	ND	48.3°N 97.57°W	22:39–22:43	1.52 mi (2.45 km)	150 yd (140 m)
EF1	A few trees were snapped and large branches were downed. The trim of a farmstead house was damaged.						
EF0	NW of Rimersburg	Clarion	PA	41.077°N 79.566°W	22:45–22:48	1 mi (1.6 km)	250 yd (230 m)
EF0	Numerous trees were snapped or uprooted.						
EF0	E of Clyde	Cavalier	ND	48.77°N 98.79°W	22:48–22:50	0.4 mi (0.64 km)	100 yd (91 m)
EF0	The public observed a tornado.						
EF0	ENE of Inkster	Grand Forks	ND	48.17°N 97.58°W	22:51–22:53	1 mi (1.6 km)	100 yd (91 m)
EF0	Large tree branches were damaged at a farmstead and in shelterbelts.						
EF1	NNW of Northwood	Grand Forks	ND	47.8°N 97.61°W	23:25–23:42	5.92 mi (9.53 km)	150 yd (140 m)
EF1	A rain-wrapped tornado snapped a few tree trunks and broke limbs in shelterbelts.						
EF1	NW of Adams	Walsh	ND	48.47°N 98.15°W	23:30–23:46	7 mi (11 km)	150 yd (140 m)
EF1	This tornado remained largely over open fields, producing intermittent dust swirls. A few hardwood trees were snapped at their trunks.						
EF0	N of Manvel	Grand Forks	ND	48.1253°N 97.2038°W	23:50–23:56	5.8 mi (9.3 km)	1,150 yd (1,050 m)
EF0	Several trees had branches snapped off at multiple shelterbelts and groves.						
EF2	W of Hatton to ENE of Hillsboro	Traill	ND	47.64°N 97.31°W	23:58–00:49	22 mi (35 km)	1,200 yd (1,100 m)
EF2	A large, long-lived, high-end EF2 multiple-vortex tornado destroyed multiple farm buildings and snapped trees as it passed between Buxton and Mayville. A powerful rear flank downdraft, with 80 to 100 mph (130 to 160 km/h) winds impacted Hillsboro directly, resulting in damage to homes and trees. The tornado dissipated as the parent mesocyclone recycled and a new tornado touched down a few miles south.						
EF1	SSW of Alvarado to E of Tabor	Polk	MN	48.11°N 97.05°W	00:07–00:30	10 mi (16 km)	250 yd (230 m)
EF1	Multiple trees were snapped or uprooted and a farmstead suffered minor damage.						
EF2	ESE of Hillsboro, ND to ESE of Halstad, MN	Traill (ND), Norman (MN)	ND, MN	47.38°N 96.98°W	00:48–01:11	11.64 mi (18.73 km)	600 yd (550 m)
EF2	A steel grain bin was crushed, several other bins were rolled, and numerous hardwood trees were snapped by this high-end EF2 tornado. A double H-frame distribution transformer was also snapped, and a barn was destroyed.						
EF2	N of Borup to N of Ulen	Norman, Clay	MN	47.22°N 96.51°W	01:42–02:06	12.81 mi (20.62 km)	500 yd (460 m)
EF2	A strong tornado lofted dozens of 2,000 lb (910 kg) hay bales more than 0.5 mi (0.80 km) across a field, snapped trees, and collapsed one shed.						

=== July 12 event ===
List of confirmed tornadoes – Wednesday, July 12, 2017
EF#	Location	County / Parish	State	Start Coord.	Time (UTC)	Path length	Max width
EF0	East Bethel to N of Forest Lake	Anoka, Chisago	MN	45.3784°N 93.2268°W	07:20–07:34	12.64 mi (20.34 km)	440 yd (400 m)
EF0	Over 100 trees were downed, some of which damaged houses, sheds, and vehicles upon falling. Siding was ripped off a home and a garage door was dented.						
EF1	W of Columbus to NE of Hugo	Anoka, Washington	MN	45.2626°N 93.1358°W	07:27–07:38	10.72 mi (17.25 km)	400 yd (370 m)
EF1	Damage was largely confined to trees; a few outbuildings were destroyed and an attached garage also collapsed.						
EF0	S of Lindstrom	Chisago	MN	45.3229°N 92.8595°W	07:39–07:40	0.55 mi (0.89 km)	200 yd (180 m)
EF0	Dozens of trees were downed and a barn was collapsed across three properties.						
EF0	SW of Marine on St. Croix	Washington	MN	45.1811°N 92.8581°W	07:41–07:44	3.03 mi (4.88 km)	250 yd (230 m)
EF0	Over 1,000 trees were damaged.						
EF0	S of Custer	Portage	WI	44.4884°N 89.4276°W	01:30–01:32	0.73 mi (1.17 km)	30 yd (27 m)
EF0	A brief tornado damaged one wall of an outbuilding and left a visible path in a corn field.						

=== July 14 event ===
List of confirmed tornadoes – Friday, July 14, 2017
EF#	Location	County / Parish	State	Start Coord.	Time (UTC)	Path length	Max width
EF0	Marana	Pima	AZ	32.4445°N 111.2182°W	01:55–01:57	0.11 mi (0.18 km)	10 yd (9.1 m)
EF0	A landspout tornado remained over open desert.						

=== July 15 event ===
List of confirmed tornadoes – Saturday, July 15, 2017
EF#	Location	County / Parish	State	Start Coord.	Time (UTC)	Path length	Max width
EF0	NE of Edgerly	Calcasieu	LA	30.28°N 93.46°W	18:14–18:15	0.05 mi (0.080 km)	10 yd (9.1 m)
EF0	A tornado briefly touched down in a field.						
EF0	NNE of West Livingston	Polk	TX	30.7418°N 94.9982°W	20:27–20:30	0.38 mi (0.61 km)	20 yd (18 m)
EF0	Some storage facility roofs were damaged.						
EF0	S of Georgetown	Williamson	TX	30.5768°N 97.6632°W	21:15–21:16	0.1 mi (0.16 km)	20 yd (18 m)
EF0	A few small sections of roof were ripped off a couple of residences. A trampoline was tossed from a backyard onto a street.						

=== July 17 event ===
List of confirmed tornadoes – Monday, July 17, 2017
EF#	Location	County / Parish	State	Start Coord.	Time (UTC)	Path length	Max width
EF0	NE of Clarissa	Todd	MN	46.1529°N 94.9219°W	22:39–22:50	4.38 mi (7.05 km)	200 yd (180 m)
EF0	Several hundred trees were broken or downed, some of which landed on power lines. An old barn was collapsed.						
EF0	E of Brandon	Douglas	MN	45.9763°N 95.5803°W	22:46–22:50	1.91 mi (3.07 km)	75 yd (69 m)
EF0	A few dozen trees were toppled.						
EF0	NNW of Carlos	Douglas	MN	45.9815°N 95.3762°W	23:07–23:16	4.68 mi (7.53 km)	200 yd (180 m)
EF0	Hundreds or trees were snapped or uprooted, some of which fell on power lines.						

=== July 19 event ===
List of confirmed tornadoes – Wednesday, July 19, 2017
EF#	Location	County / Parish	State	Start Coord.	Time (UTC)	Path length	Max width
EF0	ESE of Rolette	Rolette	ND	48.6605°N 99.7982°W	14:35–14:36	0.26 mi (0.42 km)	25 yd (23 m)
EF0	A county deputy witnessed a tornado touchdown.						
EF0	Surf City	Pender	NC	34.4181°N 77.5553°W	15:23–15:25	0.15 mi (0.24 km)	25 yd (23 m)
EF0	A waterspout moved ashore, tossing patio furniture and inflicting minor damage to wooden patio fencing. Two homes and a townhouse sustained minor roof damage.						
EF0	SSW of Marshall	Lyon	MN	44.3831°N 95.8188°W	19:00–19:02	0.5 mi (0.80 km)	50 yd (46 m)
EF0	A brief tornado touched down in a broader swath of straight-line winds.						
EF0	S of Marshall	Lyon	MN	44.3921°N 95.78°W	19:02–19:03	1.54 mi (2.48 km)	50 yd (46 m)
EF0	A brief tornado touched down in a broader swath of straight-line winds.						
EF0	S of Springfield	Brown	MN	44.1615°N 95.0339°W	19:48–19:55	5.32 mi (8.56 km)	330 yd (300 m)
EF0	The roofs were ripped off two sheds near a farm. Some trees were damaged.						
EF1	ESE of Chester	Olmsted	MN	43.9932°N 92.3203°W	22:07–22:08	0.77 mi (1.24 km)	25 yd (23 m)
EF1	Extensive tree damage was observed. Some trees landed on a beach house and a fence at the beach of Chester Woods Park.						
EF0	SE of Riceville	Howard	IA	43.3208°N 92.4509°W	22:15–22:16	0.72 mi (1.16 km)	20 yd (18 m)
EF0	A corner of a pole shed was ripped out of the ground. A narrow path through a corn field was identified via drone footage.						
EF1	SE of Wykoff	Fillmore	MN	43.6942°N 92.2193°W	22:25–22:28	2.03 mi (3.27 km)	30 yd (27 m)
EF1	Trees, crops, and one barn were damaged.						
EF0	Morgan City	St. Mary	LA	29.7069°N 91.1494°W	22:30–22:31	0.67 mi (1.08 km)	10 yd (9.1 m)
EF0	A waterspout formed over Lake Palourde and dissipated before moving ashore.						
EF1	McGregor	Clayton	IA	43.0096°N 91.2827°W	23:08–23:16	5.78 mi (9.30 km)	400 yd (370 m)
EF1	Numerous trees were snapped or uprooted, and numerous structures were damaged in McGregor, including two frail buildings in the downtown area that were destroyed. Homes sustained roof damage, signs and power poles were blown over, and outbuildings were damaged or destroyed as well. Outside of town, a storage shed was destroyed, a billboard was blown over, and an outbuilding had part of its metal roof peeled back. Two people were injured by flying glass.						

=== July 20 event ===
List of confirmed tornadoes – Thursday, July 20, 2017
EF#	Location	County / Parish	State	Start Coord.	Time (UTC)	Path length	Max width
EF2	Hamburg	Erie	NY	42.7416°N 78.8575°W	16:30–16:40	6.11 mi (9.83 km)	700 yd (640 m)
EF2	Hundreds of car windows were blown out at the Hamburg Fairgrounds, where the grandstand was heavily damaged. Several homes and other buildings sustained damage in town, and a large garage structure its entire roof torn off. Numerous trees were downed, and a home surveillance camera captured video of the tornado lofting a car parked in a driveway a few feet off the ground.						
EF1	Holland	Erie	NY	42.6676°N 78.5606°W	16:55–16:56	1.34 mi (2.16 km)	450 yd (410 m)
EF1	Several structures were damaged, and a significant amount of tree damage was observed, the latter of which resulted in blocked roads/railways and downed wires.						
EF0	W of Houghton	Allegany	NY	42.4331°N 78.2166°W	17:29–17:30	1.06 mi (1.71 km)	150 yd (140 m)
EF0	A small shed was destroyed, and trees were twisted and downed along the path.						
EF1	N of Angelica	Allegany	NY	42.3503°N 78.016°W	17:45–17:52	4.22 mi (6.79 km)	740 yd (680 m)
EF1	A barn was severely damaged and several homes sustained lesser damage. Numerous large trees were heavily damaged or downed, resulting in additional structural damage.						

=== July 21 event ===
List of confirmed tornadoes – Friday, July 21, 2017
EF#	Location	County / Parish	State	Start Coord.	Time (UTC)	Path length	Max width
EF1	W of Kelliher	Beltrami	MN	47.9400°N 94.6600°W	20:45–20:50	2.81 mi (4.52 km)	200 yd (180 m)
EF1	Numerous trees were snapped, a couple of grain bins were toppled, walls and roof panels were blown out of pole sheds, and calving sheds were flipped.						
EF0	S of Glyndon	Clay	MN	46.81°N 96.58°W	22:34–22:35	0.4 mi (0.64 km)	100 yd (91 m)
EF0	A weak tornado was observed over open farmland.						
EF0	W of Hills	Johnson	IA	41.55°N 91.62°W	22:44–22:45	0.12 mi (0.19 km)	10 yd (9.1 m)
EF0	The public reported a brief tornado.						
EF0	NNW of McDonald	Cheyenne	KS	39.9°N 101.45°W	22:52–23:10	0.01 mi (0.016 km)	400 yd (370 m)
EF0	Multiple people reported a landspout tornado.						
EF1	Northern Fulton	Whiteside	IL	41.8722°N 90.1666°W	00:19–00:26	3.72 mi (5.99 km)	150 yd (140 m)
EF1	A waterspout formed over Mississippi River and moved through the northern part of Fulton, damaging a cemetery and downing many trees. One garage lost a door while a second had a wall blown out. A farm outbuilding had metal roofing ripped off, and crop damage was observed.						
EF0	WSW of Sanger	Oliver	ND	47.15°N 101.07°W	01:50–01:55	0.17 mi (0.27 km)	25 yd (23 m)
EF0	The public reported a tornado.						

=== July 22 event ===
List of confirmed tornadoes – Saturday, July 22, 2017
EF#	Location	County / Parish	State	Start Coord.	Time (UTC)	Path length	Max width
EF1	NNW of McArthur	Vinton	OH	39.3022°N 82.5248°W	22:48–22:50	0.8 mi (1.3 km)	230 yd (210 m)
EF1	Numerous trees were snapped, a couple of grain bins were toppled, walls and roof panels were blown out of pole sheds, and calving sheds were flipped.						
EF0	WNW of Hebron	Lebanon	PA	40.334°N 76.389°W	23:40–23:41	0.1 mi (0.16 km)	25 yd (23 m)
EF0	One tree and several smaller limbs from nearby trees were broken. A few loose yard objects indicated a convergent wind pattern.						

=== July 23 event ===
List of confirmed tornadoes – Sunday, July 23, 2017
EF#	Location	County / Parish	State	Start Coord.	Time (UTC)	Path length	Max width
EF0	N of Idaville	White	IN	40.8223°N 86.655°W	19:33–19:41	1.71 mi (2.75 km)	50 yd (46 m)
EF0	Homes and barns sustained roof damage. A corn field, garage, and trees were damaged. A porch was thrown.						

=== July 24 event ===
List of confirmed tornadoes – Monday, July 24, 2017
EF#	Location	County / Parish	State	Start Coord.	Time (UTC)	Path length	Max width
EF2	Stevensville	Queen Anne's	MD	38.9637°N 76.3485°W	05:23–05:27	2.37 mi (3.81 km)	150 yd (140 m)
EF2	A strong waterspout formed over Chesapeake Bay and moved across Kent Island, resulting in major damage in Stevensville. Multiple homes were damaged, a few had roofs removed, and one was destroyed with only interior walls left standing. Several townhouses sustained major structural damage, with their second floors ripped off or the sides of the structure blown out. Vehicles were flipped, a boat was tossed, a church had its roof ripped off, and a warehouse building was destroyed. A business and a produce stand were destroyed, many trees were snapped and uprooted, and metal power poles were downed as well. Gas leaks and a house fire occurred as a result of the tornado, and one person was injured by flying debris.						
EF0	N of Snydertown	Northumberland	PA	40.9171°N 76.6692°W	19:57–19:58	0.34 mi (0.55 km)	25 yd (23 m)
EF0	A brief path was evident in a vegetation field.						

=== July 25 event ===
List of confirmed tornadoes – Tuesday, July 25, 2017
EF#	Location	County / Parish	State	Start Coord.	Time (UTC)	Path length	Max width
EF0	SW of Stickney	Aurora	SD	43.54°N 98.58°W	00:50–00:55	0.25 mi (0.40 km)	25 yd (23 m)
EF0	Minor damage to trees and farm outbuildings was noted.						

=== July 26 event ===
List of confirmed tornadoes – Wednesday, July 26, 2017
EF#	Location	County / Parish	State	Start Coord.	Time (UTC)	Path length	Max width
EF0	S of DeWitt	Clinton	IA	41.7974°N 90.5592°W	23:06–23:10	1.25 mi (2.01 km)	25 yd (23 m)
EF0	A few tree branches were downed and a swing set was damaged.						

=== July 27 event ===
List of confirmed tornadoes – Thursday, July 27, 2017
EF#	Location	County / Parish	State	Start Coord.	Time (UTC)	Path length	Max width
EF0	NNE of Mayport	Duval	FL	30.4055°N 81.4039°W	17:38–17:41	0.11 mi (0.18 km)	40 yd (37 m)
EF0	A lifeguard stand was rolled several times, a truck was damaged, and debris was scattered throughout Huguenot Beach Park.						

=== July 29 event ===
List of confirmed tornadoes – Saturday, July 29, 2017
EF#	Location	County / Parish	State	Start Coord.	Time (UTC)	Path length	Max width
EF0	S of Saint David	Cochise	AZ	31.81°N 110.2°W	23:00–23:02	0.12 mi (0.19 km)	10 yd (9.1 m)
EF0	Evidence of a brief landspout tornado was relayed through social media.						
EF0	SE of Dagmar	Sheridan	MT	48.5538°N 104.1507°W	23:00–23:02	0.13 mi (0.21 km)	10 yd (9.1 m)
EF0	County dispatch reported a brief rope tornado.						

=== July 31 event ===
Event was associated with Tropical Storm Emily.

List of confirmed tornadoes – Monday, July 31, 2017
EF#	Location	County / Parish	State	Start Coord.	Time (UTC)	Path length	Max width
EF0	West Bradenton	Manatee	FL	27.51°N 82.66°W	19:55–19:57	0.69 mi (1.11 km)	100 yd (91 m)
EF0	Two barns were destroyed. Multiple greenhouses and an engineered wall were toppled.						

== See also ==
- Tornadoes of 2017
- List of United States tornadoes in May 2017
- List of United States tornadoes in August 2017
