= List of Utah tornadoes =

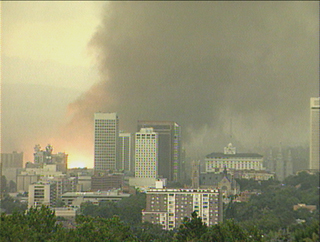
1999 Salt Lake City tornado near peak intensity

There have been at least 160 confirmed tornadoes in the U.S. State of Utah since 1941.

On average, two or three tornados touch down in the state per year. Nine tornados touched down in 2024, and seven in both 1998 and 2025. Most tornadoes in Utah are weak and short lived. However, a tornado at lowest intensity on the Enhanced Fujita scale (EF-0) occurred in extreme south-eastern Utah and traveled 28.7 mi (46.2 km) on June 6, 2015, making it the longest tracked tornado in the state's history.

Ranked in intensity using the Fujita scale there has been one Utah tornado at peak intensity (F-3 or EF-3) since 1950. This event happened August 11, 1993 in Duchesne County, Utah. There have been two deadly tornado in the state: two people died in an 1878 tornado, and there was one fatality during the 1999 Salt Lake City tornado which killed one person.

== Climatology ==
Each year, an average two tornadoes touch down in Utah, most of them being weak and short lived. There were nine confirmed tornadoes in 2024, the most in a single year since records started. Multiple years had no confirmed tornadoes to touch down in the state, most recently 2020.

There is a possibility that unrecorded tornadoes occur in sparely populated and unpopulated regions of the state, potentially raising the average numbers of tornadoes in Utah. Some Utah counties have very low populations and large unoccupied areas, including Piute, Wayne, Garfield and Sevier.

== Tornadoes ==
Confirmed tornadoes by Enhanced Fujita rating
| EFU | EF0 | EF1 | EF2 | EF3 | EF4 | EF5 | Total |
|---|---|---|---|---|---|---|---|
| 24 | 94 | 28 | 14 | 1 | 0 | 0 | 161 |
Note that tornadoes on this list are rated on both the Fujita scale and the Enhanced Fujita scale

=== Pre–1950 ===
| FU | F0 | F1 | F2 | F3 | F4 | F5 |
|---|---|---|---|---|---|---|
| 0 | 0 | 0 | 1 | 0 | 0 | 0 |

- May 21, 1878 – A tornado struck Salt Lake City, completely destroying a home, two people were killed and one person survived but suffered broken legs. This was the first recorded tornado to cause death in the state.
- May 27, 1941 – An F2 tornado tore through Davis County; barns were destroyed and a church lost its roof.

=== 1950–1959 ===
| FU | F0 | F1 | F2 | F3 | F4 | F5 |
|---|---|---|---|---|---|---|
| 0 | 4 | 2 | 1 | 0 | 0 | 0 |

- June 5, 1953 – A weak F0 tornado tracked 8 mi (13 km) through Farmington, Utah.
- July 14, 1953 – A brief F0 tracked near New Harmony.
- May 25, 1954 – A brief F1 traveled near Bear Lake on the Utah side causing little to no damage.
- June 1, 1955 – A short lived F1 tornado tracked near Maeser causing little damage.
- June 16, 1955 – Two tornadoes touched down this day, a brief, weak F0 that struck Fayette, and a strong F2 that hit the same area.
- August 7, 1957 – An F0 traveled near Salina causing little damage.

=== 1960–1969 ===
| FU | F0 | F1 | F2 | F3 | F4 | F5 |
|---|---|---|---|---|---|---|
| 0 | 8 | 5 | 5 | 0 | 0 | 0 |

- May 4, 1961 – A long tracked F2 tornado struck the small town of Green River.
- July 9, 1962 – An F0 traveled through rural Box Elder County.
- June 3, 1963 – An F2 tracked near Bountiful.
- August 28, 1964 – An F1 tornado started in Gunnison causing damage before crossing into Centerfield across its brief 0.1 mi (0.16 km) path.
- February 8, 1965 – Early in the year, an F2 went through Magna Causing significant damage.
- June 23, 1965 — An F1 touched down near the Utah-Wyoming border North-East of Woodruff.
- June 25, 1965 – An F0 was reported by the pilot of an aircraft about 35 mi (56 km) west of Salt Lake City in rural Tooele County, a touch down was observed by employees of the state highway department.
- July 9, 1965 – An F1 touched down in rural Utah County, South-East of Sundance Resort.
- August 9, 1965 – An F0 touched down south of the Bonneville Salt Flats in rural Tooele County.
- April 17, 1966 – An F1 caused damage in Springville.
- May 9, 1966 – An F0 touched down South-West of Ferron causing no damage.
- June 16, 1967 – An F0 traveled through rural Iron County.
- November 2, 1967 – A significant F2 tornado caused damage in the town of Emery.
- May 22, 1968 – A weak and brief F0 tornado traveled in rural Tooele County.
- August 14, 1968 – Three tornadoes touched down this day, the first of which being an F2 in Marriott-Slaterville, this tornado traveled 1.5 mi (2.4 km) through the city causing $250,000 in damage ($2.34 million in 2026) and one injury. Later in the day a brief F1 tornado touched down in downtown Salt Lake City causing $2.5k in damage ($23,365 in 2026). The last tornado of the day would be a weak F0 that traveled 4.1 mi (6.6 km) NW of Newton.
- May 31, 1969 – A brief F0 tornado would touch down in rural Wayne County.

=== 1970–1979 ===
| FU | F0 | F1 | F2 | F3 | F4 | F5 |
|---|---|---|---|---|---|---|
| 0 | 3 | 3 | 1 | 0 | 0 | 0 |

- April 19, 1970 – An F1 tornado traveled 1.5 mi (2.4 km) just SW of the town Annabella causing $250 in damages ($2,336 in 2026) and one injury.
- June 5, 1970 – A brief F0 tornado touched down near the Great Salt Lake in rural Box Elder County.
- June 10, 1970 – Two tornadoes were confirmed this day, the first being a brief F0 that touched down north of Fruit Heights. The second tornado being a much more significant but brief F2 tornado would touch down near Thompson Springs.
- December 2, 1970 – An F1 tornado would touch down in rural Utah County traveling 1 mi (1.6 km) and reaching a peak width of 300 yd (270 m).
- September 2, 1971 – A brief F0 tornado would touch down on the west side of Utah Lake.

=== 1980–1989 ===
| FU | F0 | F1 | F2 | F3 | F4 | F5 |
|---|---|---|---|---|---|---|
| 0 | 17 | 7 | 0 | 0 | 0 | 0 |

- May 6, 1981 – An F1 tornado was observed near Newton. The tornado moved through an irrigation ditch and across a hayfield. It lifted water out of the ditch and toppled a few fence posts. No injuries or fatalities were confirmed with this event.
- July 24, 1981 – An F0 tornado was observed north of the Banksville airport in Wayne County by a pilot, a highway patrolman, and the weather observer.
- March 29, 1982 – An F0 tornado was reported by a weather observer at Milford. The tornado touched down in a sage bush causing no damage.
- May 3, 1982 – A brief F0 tornado touched down in rural Beaver County causing no damage.
- September 13, 1982 – An F0 rated waterspout over the Utah Lake moved ashore and caused damage to a small airplane at the Provo Municipal Airport.
- August 13, 1984 – A weak F0 tornado touched down briefly roughly 5 mi (8.0 km) south of Provo.
- August 15, 1984 – An F0 tornado touched down briefly about 5 mi (8.0 km) south of Manti in Sanpete County. The funnel was reported on the ground for about 5 minutes.
- August 16, 1984 – Two tornadoes were reported between Tremonton and Snowville near the Idaho border. both tornadoes occurred around 10 mi (16 km) apart from each other causing no major damage.
- August 19, 1984 – The fifth tornado in a week was reported in the Otter Creek area of the Parker mountains. The tornado was on the ground for 30 seconds and was rated F0.
- September 11, 1984 – An F0 tornado was observed near Myton causing little to no damage.
- May 30, 1986 – A NWS Cooperative Observer from Enterprise spotted a tornado while driving along Utah Highway 18 from Beryl Junction to Enterprise. the tornado continued southward for 3.5 mi (5.6 km) before lifting, the tornado would be rated F1.
- August 31, 1986 – A brief F0 tornado would touch down in Wayne County causing no damage.
- September 9, 1986 – An F0 tornado touched down briefly in the Kearns area. The funnel was only on the ground for a few seconds.
- May 29, 1987 – An F1 tornado touched down approximately 1.5 mi (2.4 km) south of the center of Lewiston. The tornado took the roof off a hay barn, turned two calf bins over, uprooted two fruit trees and a pine tree. Two other pine trees were then twisted out of the ground and dropped on a fence, the tornado caused around $5,000 in damage ($14,315 in 2026).
- August 25, 1987 – Two cold air funnel type tornadoes touched down briefly then immediately receded back into the clouds, these 2 tornadoes were both rated F0.
- May 29, 1988 – An F0 tornado was reported to have touched down and damaged a roof, a chimney, and a utility pole in Lapoint. Total damage was esimated at $3,000 ($8,248 in 2026).
- January 10, 1989 – An F1 tornado produced a fair amount of damage to Sandy . Significant structural damage occurred to three roofs with minor damage to three others. The tornado also tore a gapping hole in one roof. Several fences were sheared off and fence material was strewn about the city.
- March 2, 1989 – An F1 touched down in Magna. The tornado produced a moderate amount of damage to the neighborhood, including tearing a swamp cooler from a roof, blowing away a small shed, and breaking several windows.
- May 11, 1989 – A small F0 tornado touched down briefly on a runway at Hill AFB causing little to no damage.
- June 7, 1989 – An F0 tornado was reported south of Delta. The funnel was on the ground for approximately 3 to 4 minutes before lifting. The tornado occurred over a field and caused no damage to property.
- July 8, 1989 – A small F1 tornado touched down near Midvale. A semi truck was blown over, a metal building had structural damage, and the windows were blown out of a car.
- September 17, 1989 – A small F1 tornado destroyed a barn in northern Cache County in the town of Cornish.

=== 1990–1999 ===
| FU | F0 | F1 | F2 | F3 | F4 | F5 |
|---|---|---|---|---|---|---|
| 0 | 25 | 8 | 1 | 1 | 0 | 0 |

- March 23, 1990 – Several residents of Naples watched a funnel cloud touch down briefly. The tornado took the roof off of a wood shed and blew it into a trailer house. The tornado was rated F0.
- April 23, 1990 – An F0 tornado briefly touched down in Farr West, a subdivision northwest of Ogden. A person was thrown from a bicycle and some roof damage was reported. One person was injured in this event.
- July 8, 1990 – An F0 tornado was reported to have momentarily touched down on a golf course south of Roosevelt.
- August 16, 1990 – An F0 tornado touched down in West Valley City causing no reported damage.
- July 25, 1991 – A long-track F1 tornado formed near the Utah-Nevada border near the town of Erda, it traveled 10 mi (16 km) across and eventually became a waterspout over the Great Salt Lake before lifting. The tornado uprooted a |60 ft (18 m) tall dead tree.
- July 26, 1991 – Strong Thunderstorms produced two tornadoes that briefly touched down before lifting. The tornadoes were observed by an Emery County Deputy Sheriff, the tornadoes caused no damage and they were both rated F0.
- September 7, 1991 – An F0 tornado was spotted by two people, the tornado touched down briefly. Since this tornado occurred in open country, it caused no damage.
- September 10, 1991 – An F0 tornado touched down in several spots in the southeast portion of Brigham City. The tornado uprooted or damaged 20 trees and destroyed a shed.
- May 21, 1992 – An F0 tornado was spotted in open country by a person driving south on Interstate 15. The tornado lifted within a minute without causing any damage.
- August 30, 1992 – An F0 tornado formed over the Salt Lake Valley. It stayed in an open field near west Kearns.
- August 31, 1992 – An F0 tornado touched down on the Utah-Arizona border near St. George, the tornado was on the ground very briefly and caused no damage.
- September 23, 1992 – An F1 tornado touched down near Syracuse damaging three properties before lifting.
- April 4, 1993 – An F1 tornado was seen by several people. The tornado touched down 100 yd (91 m) west of a restaurant. As the tornado moved toward the restaurant it tore off tree limbs, and scattered 48 to 60 pieces of plywood and 300 2-by-4's that had been lying around. An outside deck on the restaurant was damaged as the tornado went by.
- May 3, 1993 – An F1 tornado touched down near Erda causing $500,000 in damages ($1,374,691 in 2026).
- May 5, 1993 – This F0 tornado was spotted by an airplane. Because the tornado only lasted a few minutes, and was in a sparsely populated region of the state, it caused no damage.
- August 11, 1993 – A rare, high-altitude, intense F3 tornado moved northeastward through the Ashley National Forest in Duchesne County, Utah, producing a swath of tree damage that was at times up to a 1/2 mi-wide (0.80 km). The tornado, which touched down three times along its 17 mi-path (27 km), destroyed 1,000 acres of forest with many trees being uprooted, with some trees that had a diameter of up to 18 in (46 cm) being snapped. Towards the end of the path, the tornado impacted a troop scout camp, where four vehicles were damaged by falling trees. This is the strongest confirmed tornado to ever occur in the state of Utah.
- November 5, 1993 – This F0 tornado was reported by a citizen near Salt Lake City. The tornado picked up some dirt while lasting only three minutes. No injuries or fatalities were confirmed with this event.
- July 29, 1995 – An F0 caused damage to houses in Centerville.
- December 5, 1995 – An F0 tornado is thought to have moved through Pleasant View. The tornado snapped a 18 in (46 cm) diameter tree and blew shingles off of many roofs, the tornado also damaged many windows and doors that were under construction.
- May 28, 1996 – A small, short-lived F0 tornado touched down southeast of Delta, it occurred in an open field with minimal damage.
- May 29, 1996 – Two tornadoes touched down this day, the first event being a small, short-lived F0 tornado that was observed in Syracuse blowing down numerous mature trees with nearby houses sustaining minor damage. The second event being a high-end F1 tornado that caused damage to homes in North Ogden. Two homes sustained major damage from trees falling on them. A car received major damage due to flying debris, numerous mature trees were downed by the tornado, and one woman sustained slight injuries to her face when windows broke in on her.
- April 5, 1997 – A small F0 tornado briefly touched down in western Utah County near Cedar Fort. The tornado was captured on videotape by a nearby resident.
- May 8, 1998 – A weak, and brief F0 tornado touched down in a trailer park in Magna and caused minor damage.
- May 21, 1998 – Two tornadoes touched down this day, the first event being a weak F0 tornado in West Point causing minimal damage. And the second event being another weak F0 tornado in Roy causing little damage.
- June 3, 1998 – A funnel cloud briefly touched down east of the Great Salt Lake in Layton causing little to no damage, the tornado was rated as an F0.
- July 23, 1998 – A weak F0 rated tornado was reported southeast of Newcastle. This tornado touched down in an umimhabited area and minimal damage occurred.
- August 20, 1998 – An F1 tornado touched down east of Ogden causing damage to trees in the area, 6 people camping were injured from flying debris.
- September 12, 1998 – An F0 rated cold core funnel cloud touched down for 5 seconds in a persons backyard, east of Salt Lake City causing light damage.
- May 5, 1999 – An F0 tornado touched down over rangeland, debris was thrown about 300 ft (91 m) into the air.
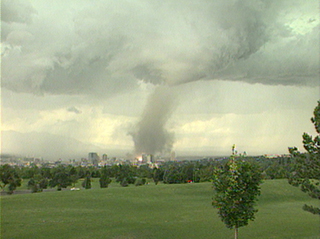
- The tornado seen in Salt Lake City while being taken from a park nearby.
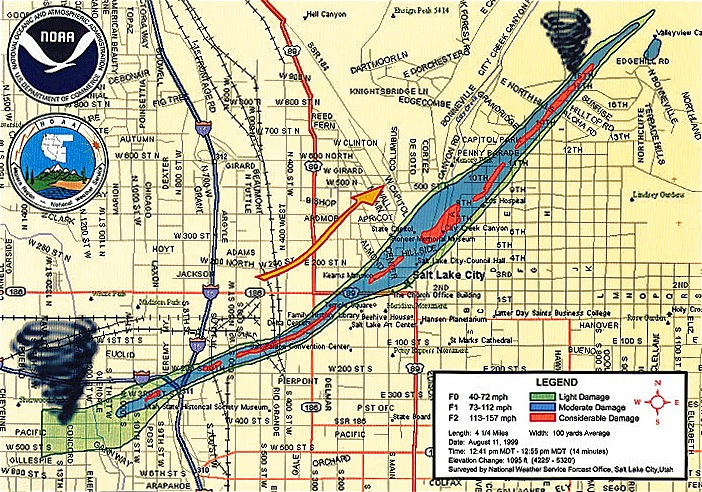
  The damage path of the Salt Lake City tornado.
  August 11, 1999 – One particular storm over the Salt Lake Valley grew to 41,000 ft (12 km) and produced a strong F2 tornado that struck Salt Lake City. Touching down at 12:41 p.m. MDT (1841 UTC), the tornado quickly intensified as it moved through the metropolitan area for 4.3 mi (6.9 km). The F2 tornado damaged or destroyed 300 structures, including the Delta Center and the city's capitol building. Overall, one 38-year-old man was killed in a tent, and 80 were injured, with losses amounted to $170 million, making it the most destructive tornado in the state's history. Attaining a maximum width of 150 yd (140 m), this tornado ranked as the most destructive on record in Utah.
- September 3, 1999 – An F1 tornado was witnessed by many people in Naples, including law enforcement personnel. Several mobile homes were damaged or destroyed, with heavy debris strewn for hundreds of yards. Several houses were damaged from flying debris and fallen trees. A horse trailer was slammed against a structure with gardens and hay pastures being leveled, the tornado tracked for 4 mi (6.4 km) and was on the ground for 10 minutes. One injury was confirmed with this event.

=== 2000–2009 ===
Note: Tornadoes in this section are rated on both the Fujita scale and the Enhanced Fujita scale

| FU | F0 | F1 | F2 | F3 | F4 | F5 |
|---|---|---|---|---|---|---|
| 0 | 21 | 0 | 1 | 0 | 0 | 0 |

- April 18, 2000 – This F0 rated tornado approached a drilling site in Moab causing minor damage.
- May 24, 2000 – This brief F0 tornado near Gunnison kicked up debris after crossing a highway kicking mud into a person's eye.
- May 25, 2000 – A small tornado touched down in the Salt Lake City suburb of Holladay in the early evening hours. The F0 tornado ripped apart a sheet metal roof on the receiving dock of a supermarket. Several cars at the tire store had their windows blown out as well.
- September 8, 2000 – Two tornadoes touched down this day, the first was an F0 that traveled 2 mi (3.2 km) near Panguitch. The second tornado was another F0 that caused minor damage near Moab.
- July 25, 2001 – A small and brief F0 tornado was observed southwest of Price causing no damage.
- August 8, 2001 – A spotter observed an F0 tornado that lasted 10 minutes near Fairview causing minor damage.
- August 21, 2001 – Two tornadoes touched down this day, the first was an narrow F0 that lasted 7 minutes near Dutch John and was spotted by at least 25 people. The tornado picked up branches, and tree limbs along its path through the forested land. The second tornado was a brief F0 that caused no damage in the Salt Lake City metropolitan area.
- September 4, 2001 – A narrow but long lasting tornado traveled 5–16 mi (8.0–25.7 km) across rural country lasting 15 minutes before dissipating near Milford.
- September 8, 2002 – Two tornadoes touched down this day, the first was a brief F0 tornado near Centerfield. The second tornado was a high-end F2 tornado with winds of up to 157 mph (253 km/h) that went through the town of Manti. semi-trailer, loaded with insulation, was lifted and thrown onto its side approximately 35–40 ft (11–12 m) away. A large amount of debris, along with a 10X10 foot wooden shed, was thrown across U.S. Route 89 and over the hill some 200–300 ft (61–91 m) away. As the tornado exited the residential area, where some of the heaviest damage occurred, a 26 ft (7.9 m) camp trailer was lifted and thrown to the west-northwest some 150–200 ft (46–61 m) and disintegrated. The tornado continued across open farmland another 0.5 mi (0.80 km) or so before dissipating near the mountains. The tornado caused $2,100,000 in damages.
- September 12, 2002 – Two tornadoes touched down this day, the first was a brief F0 tornado near Ephraim that lasted for a few seconds over rural land. The second tornado was another brief F0 tornado near Hanksville, debris from the ground was observed rising before the funnel dissipated.
- June 9, 2003 – A brief F0 tornado touched down in the town of Payson damaging about 100 ft (30 m) of vinyl fence and lifted a small aluminum boat off of its trailer.
- August 22, 2003 – A brief F0 tornado picked up rocks and shrubs before dissipating near Levan, the tornado lasted just one minute.
- May 30, 2005 – A brief F0 traveled along the Utah Lake shore in Lehi photographed by a spotter.
- June 23, 2005 – A brief and small F0 tornado was reported by law enforcement in Duchesne along Highway 49.
- June 25, 2005 – A brief and small F0 tornado flipped over a motor home and blew the roof off a shed near Mount Pleasant.
- August 2, 2005 – An F0 tornado touched down on Antelope island near Bountiful being photographed by a resident, the tornado lasted 15 minutes.
- June 8, 2006 – A small F0 tornado was observed by an NWS employee west of Green River, the tornado caused no damage.
- September 22, 2006 – A brief F0 tornado traveled across open country and ripped branches off of juniper and pinyon pine trees.
- | EFU | EF0 | EF1 | EF2 | EF3 | EF4 | EF5 |
  |---|---|---|---|---|---|---|
  | 0 | 5 | 0 | 0 | 0 | 0 | 0 |
  July 25, 2007 – A brief EF0 tornado was reported along I-15 in Plymouth, the tornado moved through a field and caused no damage.
- May 3, 2009 – An EF0 tornado caused damage in Willard uprooting several trees, snapping a couple more trees, and tossed an empty snowmobile trailer.
- May 24, 2009 – A brief EF0 tornado was observed west of Milford causing no damage.
- August 6, 2009 – Two tornadoes touched down this day, the first was an EF0 that crossed Pelican Lake southeast of Randlett. The tornado tore up some trees and flipped over a trailer used for living quarters at a man camp, the tornado traveled 2.18 mi (3.51 km) in total. The second tornado was an EF0 that tore through Vernal. A number of trees had large limbs broken off and some minor damage occurred to sheds.

=== 2010–2019 ===
| EFU | EF0 | EF1 | EF2 | EF3 | EF4 | EF5 |
|---|---|---|---|---|---|---|
| 2 | 10 | 2 | 0 | 0 | 0 | 0 |

- July 26, 2010 – A few large trees and a trailer were damaged by a brief EF0 tornado south of Wellington.
- October 6, 2010 – About 30 juniper trees were snapped or uprooted in a remote forested area by an EF0 tornado near the Canyonlands National Park.
- August 24, 2011 – A trained spotter observed an EF0 tornado west of Apple Valley. The weak tornado was short-lived and caused no damage.
- August 21, 2012 – Sheriff reported a brief touchdown along the Utah/Nevada border WSW of Newhouse that caused no known damage and was rated EF0.
- September 7, 2013 – Very small and brief EF0 tornado removed the metal roof from a barn, damaged a few outbuildings, and downed a few trees ENE of American Fork.
- June 6, 2015 – Numerous members of the public observed an EF0 tornado that tracked across open country SE of Mexican Hat to SE of Montezuma Creek lasting approximately 15 minutes and tracking 28.7 mi (46.2 km).
- June 16, 2015 – Members of the public reported an EF0 tornado over open country SSE of Dutch John.
- August 26, 2016 – Members of the public photographed a brief EF0 tornado southeast of Panguitch.
- September 22, 2016 – Two EF1 tornadoes touched down this day. The first event was a high-end EF1 that produced damage to trees, homes, and other structures along an intermittent path from Washington Terrace to South Ogden across a 2.85 mi (4.59 km) path and being on the ground for 15 minutes. Approximately 12 homes in Washington Terrace were so damaged that they were deemed uninhabitable until repaired. The tornado injured 5 people and caused $2,000,000 in damages. The second event was an EF1 tornado that produced EF0 damage to homes and trees and EF1 damage to a business along an intermittent path in Panguitch.
- July 8, 2017 – A member of the public photographed a brief EFU tornado SSW of Hurricane.
- July 10, 2017 – A member of the public photographed a brief EFU tornado WNW of Hatch.
- May 28, 2018 – Two tornadoes occurred this day, the first event being a highly visible EF0 tornado that passed over the Strawberry Reservoir, the tornado was caught on video and photographed by many people. The second event being a brief EF0 tornado that was observed by the public in Snowville causing minimal damage.

=== 2020–present ===
| EFU | EF0 | EF1 | EF2 | EF3 | EF4 | EF5 |
|---|---|---|---|---|---|---|
| 22 | 1 | 2 | 3 | 0 | 0 | 0 |

- July 13, 2021 – A rain shower produced a brief EFU rated landspout in Mona, which was caught on video.
- July 14, 2021 – A widely visible EFU rated landspout touched down 1 mi (1.6 km) north of Huntington.
- July 28, 2021 – A weak but well-formed EFU rated landspout was widely observed in northern Ogden.
- September 2, 2021 – An EF1 tornado that touched down northwest of North Salt Lake and crossed into Woods Cross damaged Several homes and businesses sustained minor to moderate damage along the path. A power pole was found leaning, while trees were uprooted and tree limbs were snapped.
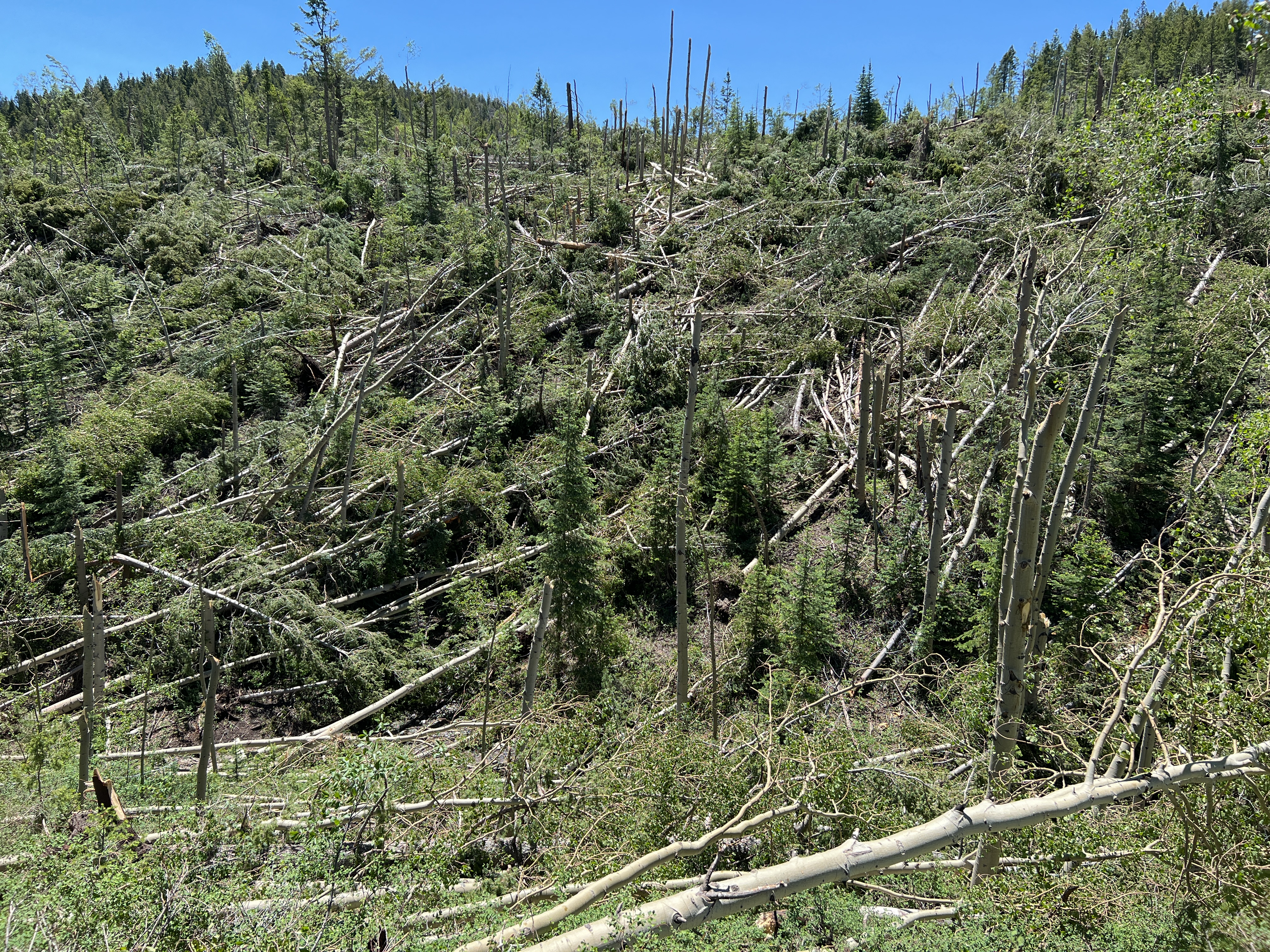
- EF2 damage to trees in Indian Canyon.
  June 19, 2022 – A large 0.5 mi (0.80 km) wide, strong EF2 rated tornado developed near US-191 in remote southwestern Duchesne County north of the ghost town, Castle Gate. Almost all trees along a large hillside were mowed down, and additional extensive tree damage was noted immediately north of US-191 where numerous trees were snapped or uprooted. This was the first Utah F/EF2 tornado in 20 years.
- July 13, 2022 – An EFU rated landspout tornado touched down in a field southwest of Grantsville in Tooele County and caused no visible damage.
- August 5, 2022 – An EFU rated landspout was observed on the northwest side of West Valley City.
- August 11, 2022 – An EFU rated landspout was videoed southwest of St. George and posted to social media.
- August 27, 2023 – Multiple photos of an EFU landspout northwest of Howell were shared via social media.
- September 10, 2023 – Broadcast media shared a video of an EFU rated landspout tornado in an open field northwest of Clarkston.
- September 13, 2023 – An EFU rated landspout tornado was photographed NNW of Roosevelt.
- March 26, 2024 – An EFU rated tornado was photographed making brief contact with the ground NNW of Aurora.
- April 25, 2024 – An EFU rated landspout had numerous photos and videos taken of it in northern Herriman.
- June 21, 2024 – Multiple photos and videos showed an EFU rated landspout occurring in open land northwest of La Sal.
- June 22, 2024 – An EFU rated tornado was photographed south of Garland.
- June 23, 2024 – Two tornadoes occurred this day, A small but well-defined tornado in southern St. George. And a tornado that was photographed along U.S. Route 191 south of Blanding. Both tornadoes were rated EFU.
- June 26, 2024 – This EFU rated tornado had a picture taken of it northeast of Koosharem and posted on social media.
- July 20, 2024 – A trained spotter observed an EFU rated landspout south of Monticello.
- September 2, 2024 – An EFU rated tornado occurred in an open field in Western West Jordan.
- April 18, 2025 – A brief EF0 rated landspout occurred just north of Cedar City. No injuries or fatalities were confirmed with this event.
- May 29, 2025 – Two tornadoes occurred this day, A well-defined landspout was recorded and posted onto social media in Northern Herriman. And a landspout that was photographed in Logan. Both tornadoes were rated EFU.
- June 5, 2025 – An EFU rated landspout occurred over Flat Iron Mesa, remaining over open country south of Moab.
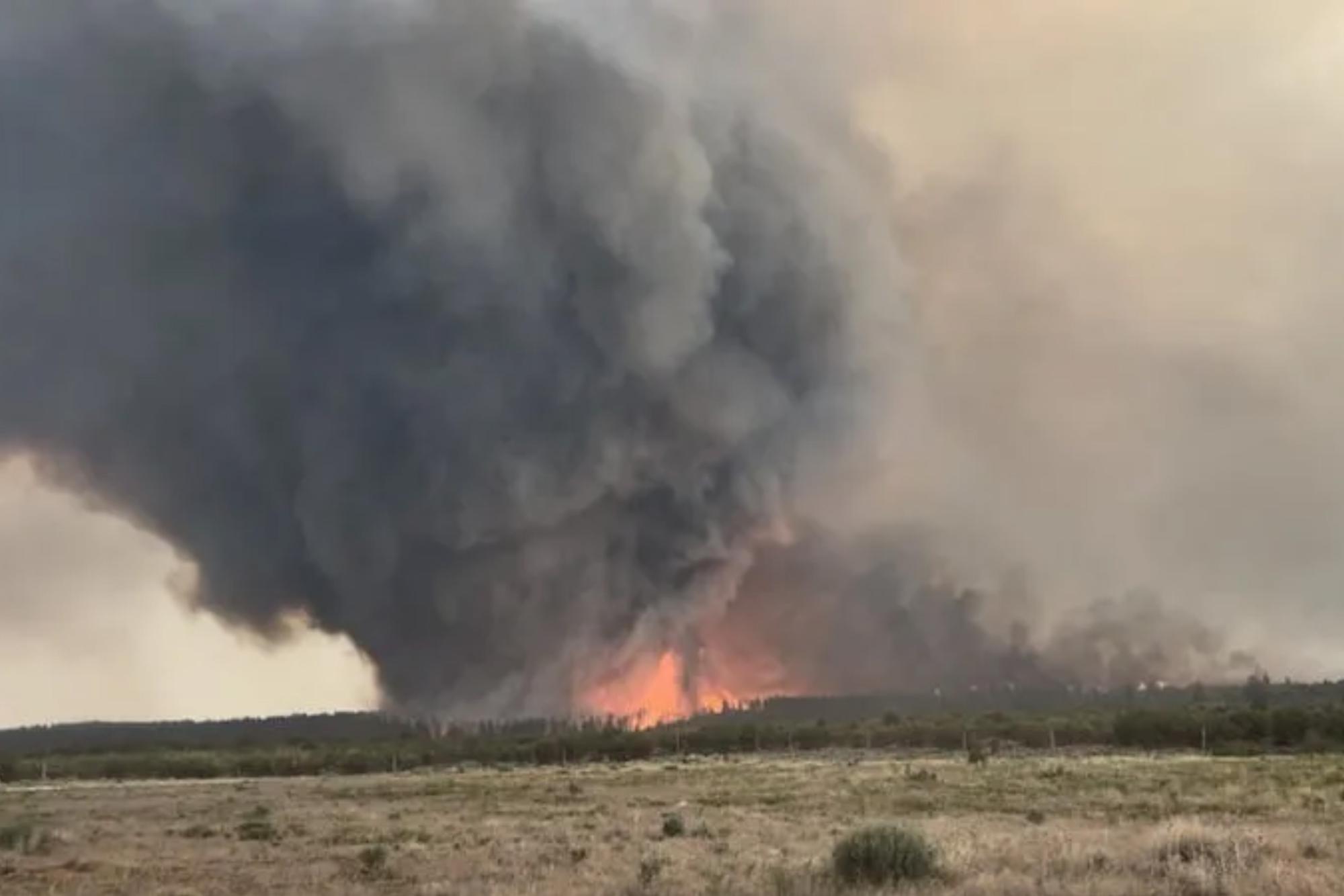
- The La Sal EF2 'firenado' from a distance
  July 12, 2025 – A nearly stationary, rare EF2 rated firenado was spawned by the Deer Creek wildfire northeast of La Sal. The roof of a home and several outbuildings sustained extensive wind and fire damage; many of the affected structures were later burned by the aforementioned fire.
- September 13, 2025 – Two tornadoes occurred this day, A short-lived EFU rated tornado remained over open country north of Montezuma Creek. And a rare EF2 tornado, this strong tornado occurred in the Navajo Nation northeast of Montezuma Creek and destroyed two homes along with a sheep corral and barn. Two 800-gallon water barrels were swept away and two horse trailers were also damaged. Additional damage to a cow corral and three vehicles was noted.
- April 11, 2026 – A brief EF1 tornado snapped or uprooted numerous trees near Garden City.
- August 13, 2026 – An EF1 tornado touched down near Dugway in Tooele County. It caused damage to a house, where the windows were broken and shingles were removed. Trees were uprooted and snapped, before it moved into a farm field, tossing irrigation equipment and damaging fences.
- September 18, 2026 - A strong EF2 tornado with a width of 1.1 miles (1.8 km) impacted Fruit Heights, becoming the widest tornado on record for the state of Utah. This is the first officially documented tornado in Morgan County since reliable records began in 1950.

== Tornadoes by county ==
More information will be added soon, in addition to the inclusion of all counties.

Tornadoes in Utah, by County
| County | Number of tornadoes | Area (mi^{2}) | Max F/EF# | Most recent (max F/EF#) |
|---|---|---|---|---|
| Salt Lake | 18 | 807 | F2 | 1999 |
| Davis | 13 | 634 | F2 | 2026 |
| Box Elder | 11 | 6,729 | EF0 | 2018 |
| Sanpete | 10 | 1,603 | F2 | 2002 |
| Utah | 10 | 2,144 | F1 | 1970 |
| Uintah | 9 | 4,501 | F1 | 2026 |
| Weber | 8 | 659 | F2 | 1968 |
| Cache | 8 | 1,173 | EF1 | 2026 |
| San Juan | 8 | 7,933 | EF2 | 2025 (twice) |
| Washington | 7 | 2,430 | F1 | 1986 |
| Emery | 7 | 4,472 | F2 | 1967 |
| Beaver | 7 | 2,592 | EF0 | 2012 |
| Tooele | 7 | 7,286 | EF1 | 2026 |
| Wayne | 6 | 2,466 | F1 | 1993 |
| Duchesne | 6 | 3,256 | F3 | 1993 |
| Grand | 4 | 3,684 | F2 | 1970 |
| Garfield | 4 | 5,208 | EF1 | 2016 |
| Sevier | 3 | 1,918 | F1 | 1970 |
| Iron | 2 | 3,301 | EF0 | 2025 |
| Rich | 2 | 1,086 | EF1 | 2026* |
| Millard | 2 | 6,828 | F0 | 1989 |
| Daggett | 2 | 721 | F0 | 1999 |
| Carbon | 2 | 1,485 | EF0 | 2010 |
| Juab | 2 | 3,406 | EFU | 2021 |
| Wasatch | 1 | 1,206 | EF0 | 2018 |

- The EF1 in 2026 traveled through both Cache and Rich counties.

== Tornadoes by month ==
Tornadoes in Utah, by month (1941–present)
| | January | February | March | April | May | June | July | August | September | October | November | December |
|---|---|---|---|---|---|---|---|---|---|---|---|---|
| No. of tornadoes | 1 | 1 | 4 | 9 | 31 | 26 | 21 | 31 | 29 | 1 | 2 | 2 |
| Max F/EF# | F1 | F2 | F1 | EF1 | F2 | EF2 | EF2 | F3 | EF2 | EF0 | F2 | F1 |

== See also ==
- 1999 Salt Lake City tornado - An F2 rated tornado that struck Downtown Salt Lake City on August 11, 1999
