= Radisson Hotel Salt Lake City Downtown =

Hotel in Salt Lake City, Utah, U.S.

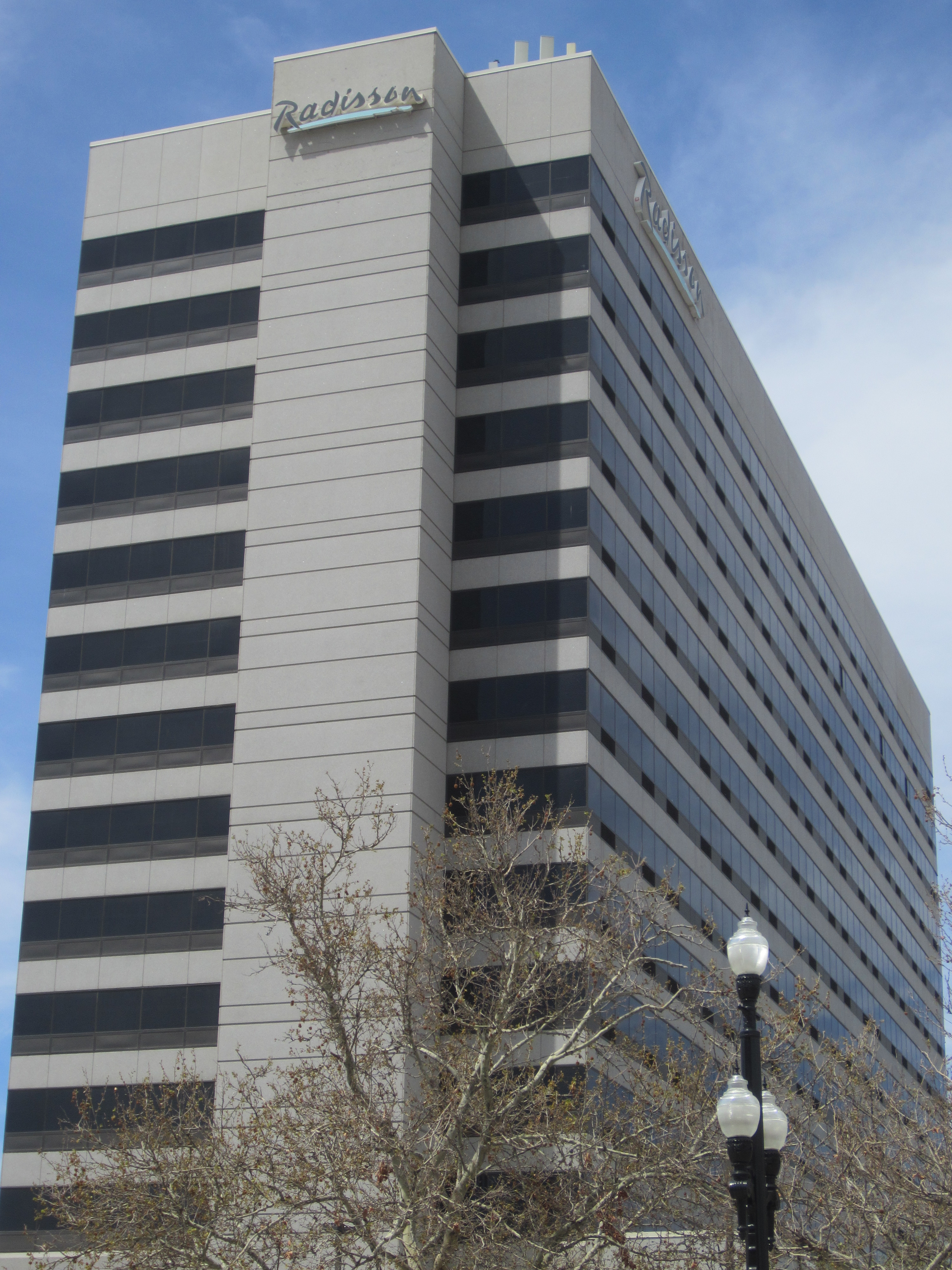
- The hotel's exterior in 2021
- Interactive map of the Radisson Hotel Salt Lake City Downtown area

General information
- Location: 215 W S Temple, Salt Lake City, Utah, United States
- Coordinates: 40°46′8.5″N 111°53′52″W

The Radisson Hotel Salt Lake City Downtown is a hotel in Salt Lake City, Utah, United States.

== Description and history ==
The 381-room hotel in Downtown Salt Lake City was completed in 1985. It was a Doubletree Hotel.

On August 11, 1999, a F2 tornado cut a path through downtown Salt Lake City. The hotel, then known as the Wyndham Hotel was severely damaged, and was closed for several days for repairs.

The hotel underwent a $5 million renovation in 2006, followed by an approximately $7 million renovation in 2012. The 15-story building was also renovated in 2019. It has 15,000 square feet of meeting space.

The hotel was renovated in the 2020s. Hale Collective was the design firm.
