= 1999 Salt Lake City tornado =

F2 tornado in Utah, US

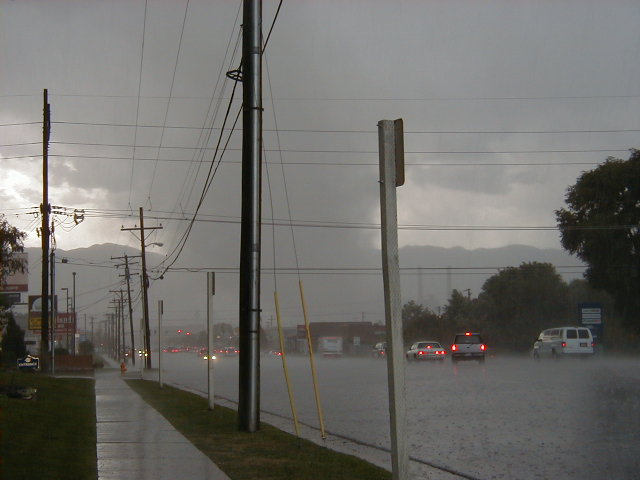
- The tornado seen from North Temple Street.

Meteorological history
- Formed: 12:41 p.m. MDT; August 11, 1999
- Dissipated: 12:55 p.m. MDT; August 11, 1999
- Duration: 14 minutes

F2 tornado
- on the Fujita scale
- Max width: 150 yards (0.085 mi; 0.14 km)
- Path length: 4.3 miles (6.9 km)
- Highest winds: >115 mph (185 km/h)

Overall effects
- Fatalities: 1
- Injuries: 80+
- Damage: US$172 million
- Areas affected: Downtown Salt Lake City
- Part of the Tornadoes of 1999

On August 11, 1999, a rare and strong F2 tornado struck Downtown Salt Lake City, Utah, United States. It was among the most notable tornadoes to hit west of the Great Plains in the 20th century and the only recorded Utah tornado that resulted in a fatality since 1878. This was the sixth significant tornado in Utah since June 1963, the second widest in the state's history, and one of only two F2 tornadoes to have hit Salt Lake County since 1950 (the other occurring on February 9, 1965, in Magna).

The tornado touched down on Concord Street, moving northeast as it destroyed homes and businesses across much of downtown Salt Lake City. The tornado would cause one fatality when a man was killed by debris near the Delta Center. The tornado caused minor damage to the Capitol Building as well as uprooting hundreds of trees in the Memory Grove before moving into The Avenues where it would cause significant damage to homes, dissipating soon after. The tornado injured over 80 people, killed 1 person, and caused over $172 million in damages to the city.

== Meteorological synopsis ==
Throughout the days before August 11th, a strong upper-level trough had developed across much of Northern Utah, coming in from Nevada. Additionally, a convergence zone had formed in the region enhancing severe weather potential. In the morning of August 11th, breezes from the Great Salt Lake began to interact with the southerly winds of the valley, which combined with a strong shear across Northern Utah and a jet stream in the region to further enhance instability. By noon thunderstorms began to form near the Great Salt Lake, one of which began to rapidly intensify and expand before dropping the Salt Lake City tornado at 12:41 p.m.

== Tornado summary ==
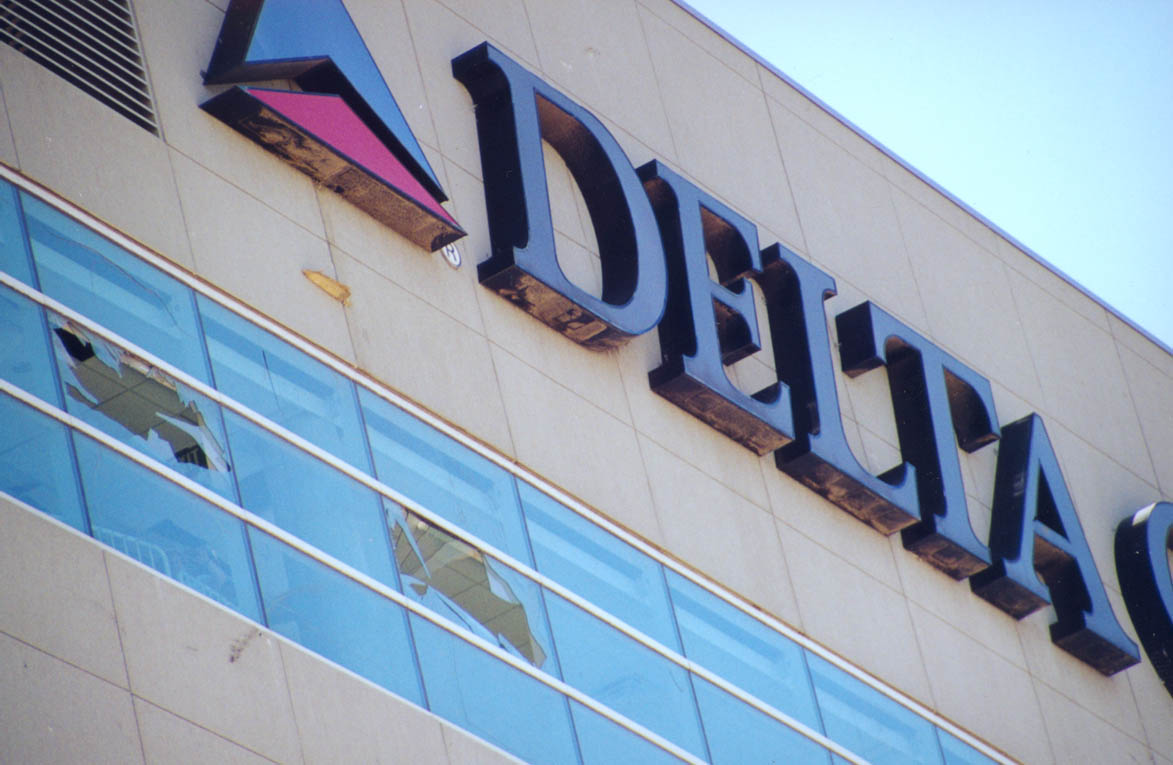
Windows blown out at the Delta Center.

The tornado touched down on Concord Street, moving northeast as it rapidly intensified to F2 strength as the Sun Tavern suffered significant damage, including the destruction of its roof and an exterior brick wall. The tornado continued to move northeast, briefly weakening and re-intensifying as it struck the Club Axis, which suffered major damage to its roof as well. The tornado re-intensified as it struck numerous businesses throughout downtown Salt Lake City, including the Delta Center, which had many of its windows blown out and part of its roof torn off, and the nearby Wyndham Hotel, which also suffered significant window damage. The nearby Outdoors Retailers Convention, where over 300 companies had set up, was struck with multiple large tents shredded and a metal beam thrown up to 1/8 of a mile. Most of the injuries occurred here, as well as the only fatality, Allen A. Crandy, who was killed by flying debris.

The tornado struck the Church of Jesus Christ of Latter Day Saints' Conference Center, which was under construction, though almost finished at the time, causing significant damage to its roof, blowing out its windows and crumpling a nearby crane and briefly weakening before intensifying once more and reaching F2 intensity for a fourth time as multiple buildings suffered significant damage to their exteriors. The nearby Capitol Building was nearly missed, with decorative trees outside of the building being uprooted and downed and nearby historic buildings being damaged. The tornado then moved through Memory Grove at F1 intensity, uprooting hundreds of trees, before entering The Avenues at F2 strength as many homes suffered major damage to their roofs and exterior walls. Many cars were damaged or totaled, and a porch in this area was picked up in once piece and thrown into a nearby yard as well. The tornado would then begin to rapidly weaken as it left The Avenues before dissipating near the outer limits of Salt Lake City. The tornado was on the ground for 14 minutes with a peak width of nearly 200 yards. Over 80 injuries, 15 to 20 of which were serious, and only one death were reported. The tornado caused over $172 million in damages along its over 3-mile path.

== Aftermath ==
The tornado damaged or destroyed approximately 800–1,000 trees. In The Avenues, over 154 homes were severely damaged, about 120 of which had roofs blown off. In total, 300 buildings were damaged or destroyed. The tornado damaged many powerlines and telephone poles causing power outages for much of Salt Lake City and blocking calls to people out of state, most of which came from retailers that had been setting up at the Outdoors Retailers Convention. In addition to the one fatality at the Outdoors Retailers Convention, over 80 injuries occurred, about a dozen of which were critical.

Trees being cleaned up in the Memory Grove.

In the immediate aftermath of the tornado, many organizations like the Salvation Army and The Church of Jesus Christ of Latter-Day Saints arrived to aid in the reconstruction efforts, with the Latter-Day Saints using a 50-page disaster booklet and "military-style plan". The LDS Hospital continued to operate using backup generators, helping 18 patients, 6 of which were trauma patients, throughout the days following the tornado. Over 500 police and emergency crews arrived to the scene to aid in cleanup as well as to prevent looting. President Bill Clinton declared Salt Lake City a disaster zone and Governor Mike Leavitt issued a state of emergency for Salt Lake City. Mayor Deedee Corradini issued an evacuation order for the city as well, forcing businesses and malls to close down by 5 p.m. As a result of the damage, the Wyndham Hotel was forced to close down for several days. The Outdoors Retailers Convention was moved to the Salt Palace, with some businesses sharing booths with competitors.

In the weeks and months following the tornado many citizens of Salt Lake City began funding for replacement lights and trees in the Memory Grove. Many of the old trees were replaced with new, drought-resistant ones. Members of the Memory Grove Foundation sent funding for a new monument as well. A new desk, known as the "New Millennium Desk", was created for Governor Mike Leavitt, using trees that had been downed by the tornado, including those from memory grove. The book "The Tornado Desk: A Symbol of Utah's Spirit and Determination", written by Utah first lady Jacalyn Leavitt, was based on her family's experiences during the tornado, and told the story behind the desk's creation.

This was the first major tornado to occur in a large urban area's downtown district and strike buildings of nearly 500 ft (150 m) tall, according to Bill Alder of the National Weather Service. It happened in an area of the U.S. where tornadoes of this strength are relatively rare.

== See also ==
- 2008 Atlanta tornado - Another EF2/F2 intensity tornado that struck a downtown area
- List of North American tornadoes and tornado outbreaks
- List of tornadoes striking downtown areas of large cities
- List of Utah tornadoes
