= Warwick, North Dakota =

- City
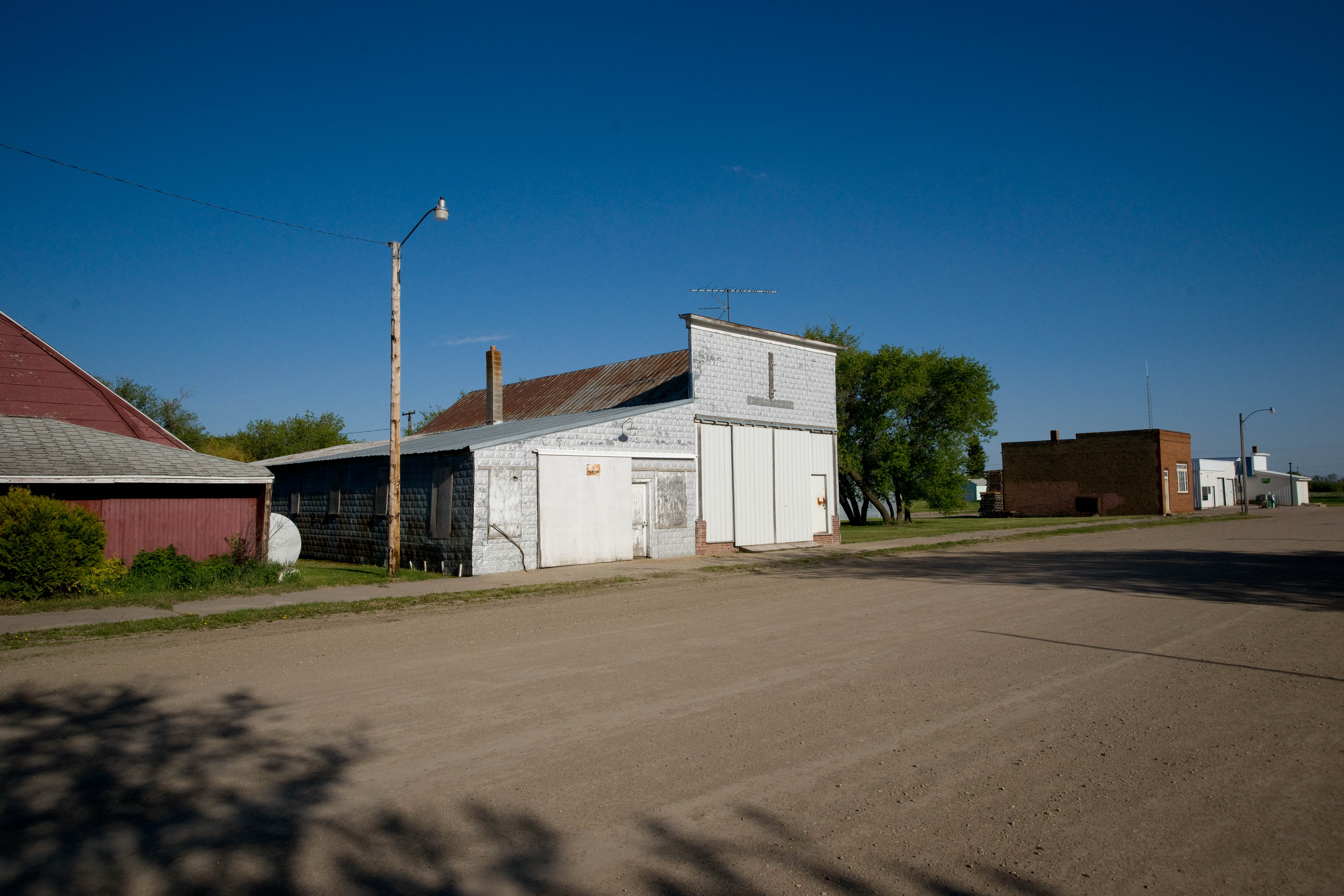
- Warwick, North Dakota

- Location of Warwick, North Dakota
- Coordinates: 47°51′17″N 98°42′20″W
- Country: United States
- State: North Dakota
- County: Benson
- Founded: 1907

Area
  - Total: 1.00 sq mi (2.60 km^{2})
  - Land: 0.65 sq mi (1.68 km^{2})
  - Water: 0.35 sq mi (0.91 km^{2})
- Elevation: 1,467 ft (447 m)

Population (2020)
  - Total: 55
  - Density: 84.6/sq mi (32.67/km^{2})
- Time zone: UTC-6 (CST)
  - Summer (DST): UTC-5 (CDT)
- ZIP code: 58381
- Area code: 701
- FIPS code: 38-83580
- GNIS feature ID: 1036315

Warwick is a city in Benson County, North Dakota, United States. The population was 55 at the 2020 census. Warwick was founded in 1907.

== Geography ==
According to the United States Census Bureau, the city has a total area of 1.00 square mile (2.59 km^{2}), of which 0.65 square miles (1.68 km^{2}) is land and 0.35 square miles (0.91 km^{2}) is water.

== Demographics ==
Historical population
Census	Pop.	Note	%±
1920	290		—
1930	249		−14.1%
1940	224		−10.0%
1950	155		−30.8%
1960	204		31.6%
1970	168		−17.6%
1980	108		−35.7%
1990	80		−25.9%
2000	75		−6.2%
2010	65		−13.3%
2020	55		−15.4%
2021 (est.)	51		−7.3%
U.S. Decennial Census; 2020 Census

=== 2010 census ===
As of the census of 2010, there were 65 people, 25 households, and 18 families living in the city. The population density was 100.0 inhabitants per square mile (38.6/km^{2}). There were 32 housing units at an average density of 49.2 per square mile (19.0/km^{2}). The racial makeup of the city was 56.9% White, 40.0% Native American, 1.5% from other races, and 1.5% from two or more races. Hispanic or Latino of any race were 3.1% of the population.

There were 25 households, of which 44.0% had children under the age of 18 living with them, 52.0% were married couples living together, 8.0% had a female householder with no husband present, 12.0% had a male householder with no wife present, and 28.0% were non-families. 28.0% of all households were made up of individuals. The average household size was 2.60 and the average family size was 3.06.

The median age in the city was 36.3 years. 29.2% of residents were under the age of 18; 9.2% were between the ages of 18 and 24; 21.5% were from 25 to 44; 26.2% were from 45 to 64; and 13.8% were 65 years of age or older. The gender makeup of the city was 60.0% male and 40.0% female.

=== 2000 census ===
As of the census of 2000, there were 75 people, 34 households, and 21 families living in the city. The population density was 113.2 inhabitants per square mile (43.7/km^{2}). There were 47 housing units at an average density of 71.0 per square mile (27.4/km^{2}). The racial makeup of the city was 57.33% White and 42.67% Native American.

There were 34 households, out of which 20.6% had children under the age of 18 living with them, 44.1% were married couples living together, 14.7% had a female householder with no husband present, and 35.3% were non-families. 35.3% of all households were made up of individuals, and 14.7% had someone living alone who was 65 years of age or older. The average household size was 2.21 and the average family size was 2.68.

In the city, the population was spread out, with 26.7% under the age of 18, 2.7% from 18 to 24, 22.7% from 25 to 44, 32.0% from 45 to 64, and 16.0% who were 65 years of age or older. The median age was 41 years. For every 100 females, there were 92.3 males. For every 100 females age 18 and over, there were 96.4 males.

The median income for a household in the city was $10,625, and the median income for a family was $29,167. Males had a median income of $26,563 versus $23,750 for females. The per capita income for the city was $10,783. There were 41.7% of families and 44.0% of the population living below the poverty line, including 50.0% of under eighteens and 50.0% of those over 64.

== Climate ==
This climatic region is typified by large seasonal temperature differences, with warm to hot (and often humid) summers and cold (sometimes severely cold) winters. According to the Köppen Climate Classification system, Warwick has a humid continental climate, abbreviated "Dfb" on climate maps.

== Education ==
Warwick Public Schools is the local school district.
