= East Smithfield, Pennsylvania =

Unincorporated community in Pennsylvania, US

- Unincorporated community
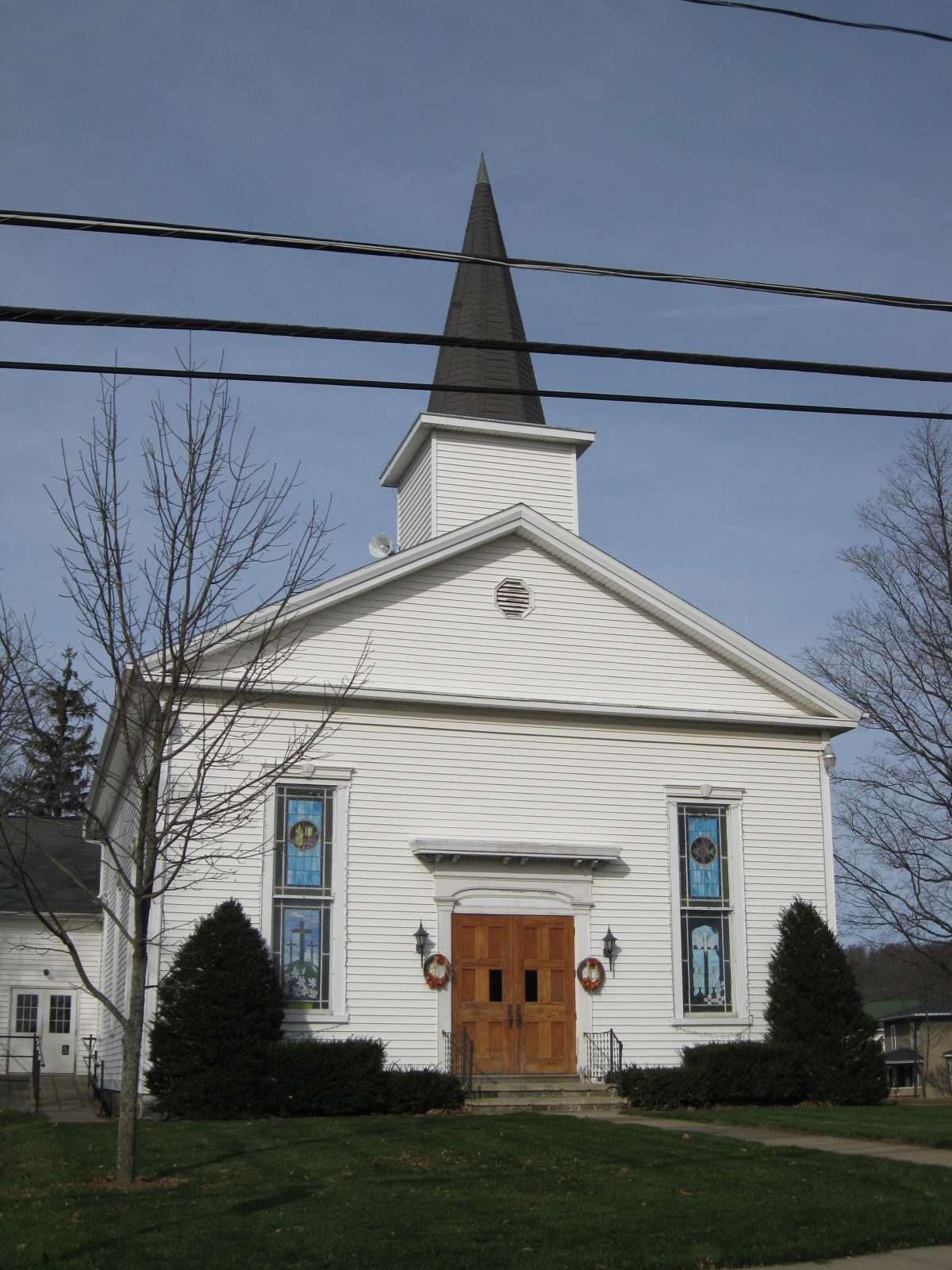
- Church in East Smithfield

- Location within Pennsylvania
- Coordinates: 41°51′52″N 76°37′32″W
- Country: United States
- State: Pennsylvania
- County: Bradford
- Elevation: 1,299 ft (396 m)
- Time zone: UTC-5 (Eastern (EST))
  - Summer (DST): UTC-4 (EDT)
- ZIP code: 18817
- Area codes: 272 & 570
- GNIS feature ID: 1173875

East Smithfield is an unincorporated community in Bradford County, Pennsylvania, United States. The community is 8.5 miles (13.7 km) southwest of Athens. East Smithfield has a post office with ZIP code 18817.

== Demographics ==
Historical population
Census	Pop.	Note	%±

The United States Census Bureau first defined East Smithfield as a census designated place in 2023.
