= List of hillside letters =

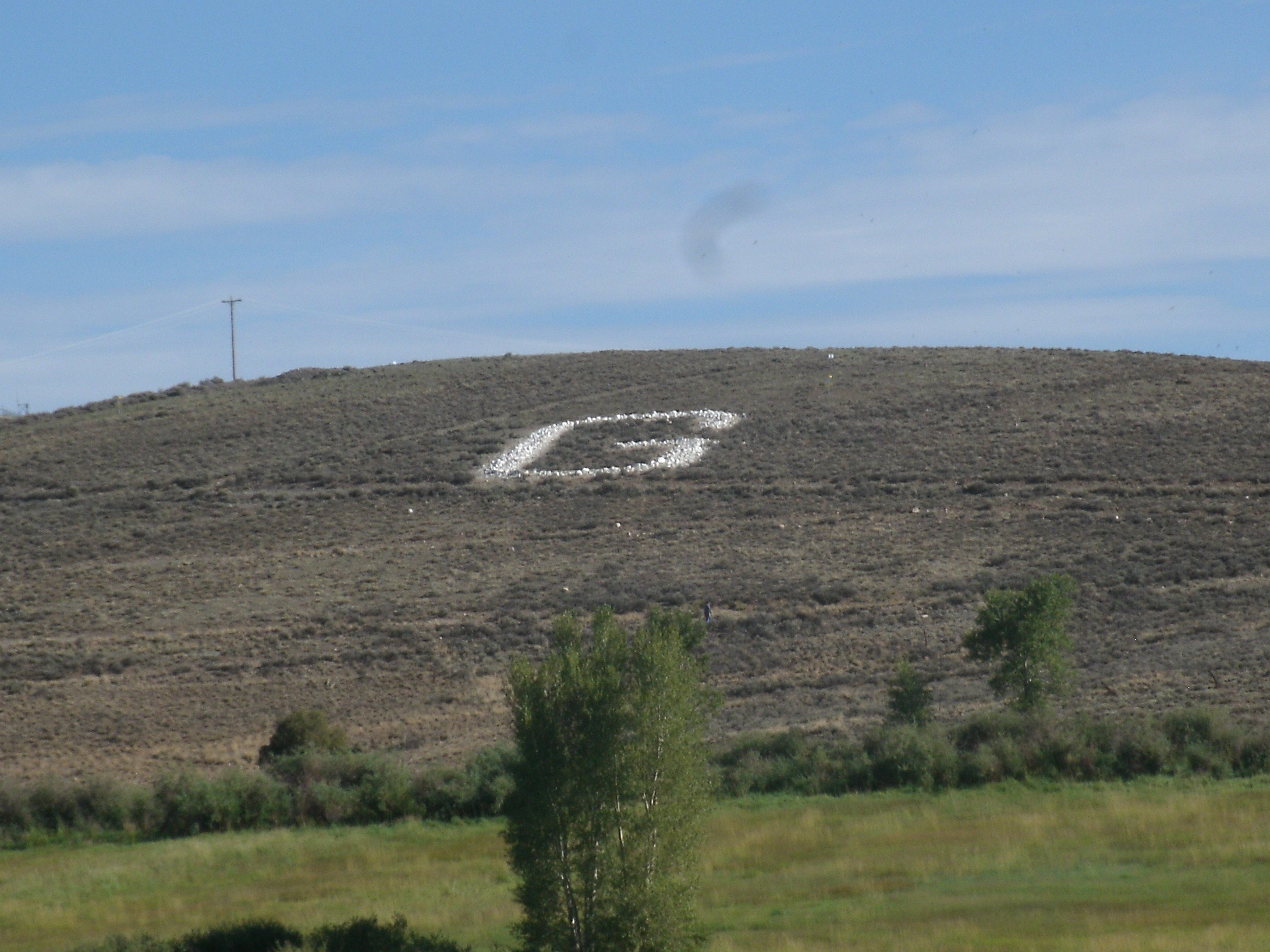
Hillside monogram on Signal Hill in Gunnison, Colorado, as seen from U.S. Hwy 50 entering the town

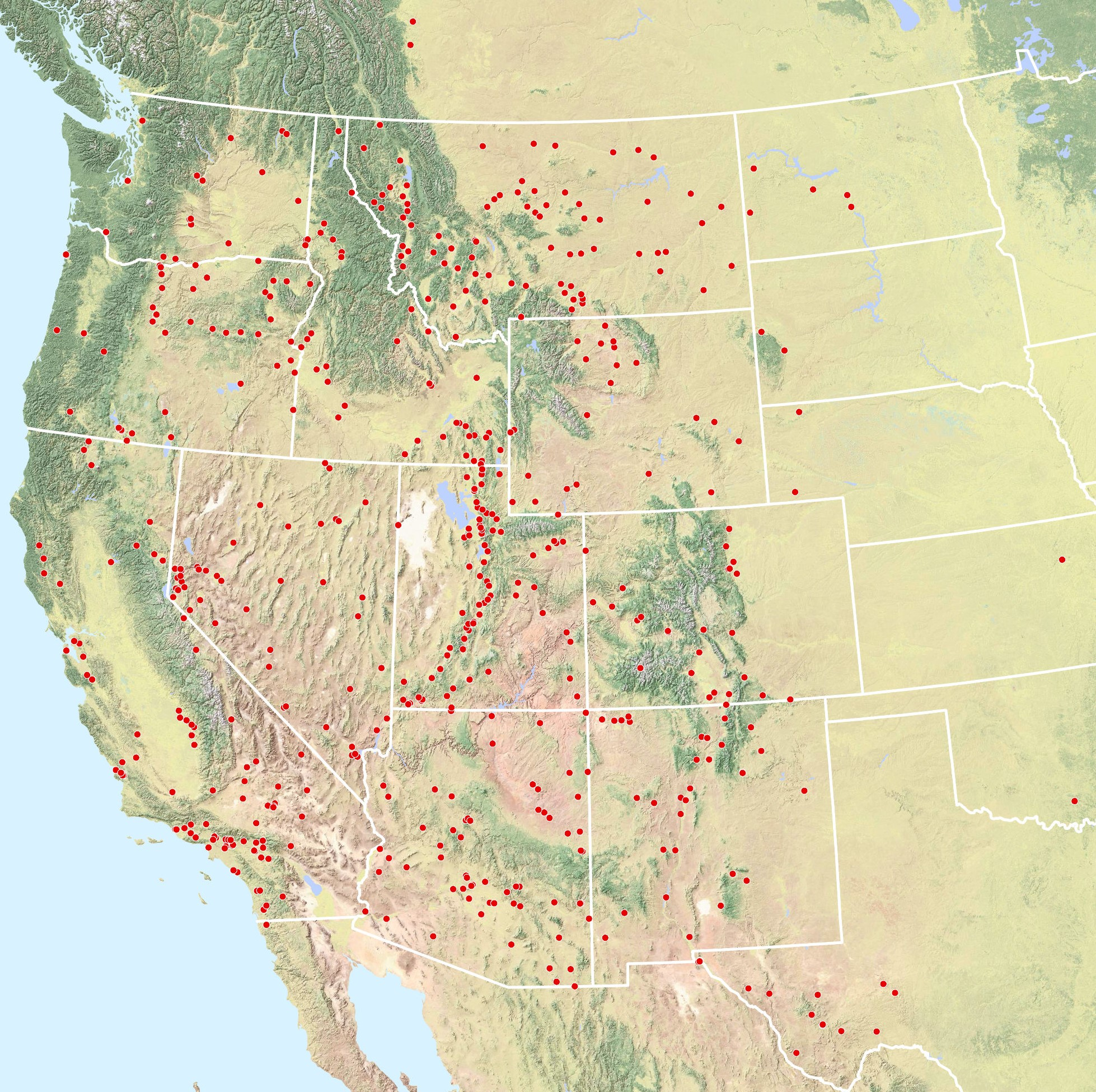
Distribution of hillside letters in the Western United States

This is a list of hillside letters (also known as mountain monograms), large geoglyphs found primarily in the Western United States. There are about 600 in total, but the status of many of these symbols are uncertain, due to vagueness in sources.

The states with the most hillside letters are:

- Montana: 130 monograms
- California: 83 monograms
- Utah: 94 monograms
- Arizona: 63 monograms
- Nevada: 47 monograms
- Oregon: 39 monograms
- Idaho: 36 monograms

== United States ==
=== Colorado ===
At least 31 monograms, possibly 33.

Monogram	Town	Description	Coordinates
A	Fort Collins	Colorado State University (formerly the Aggies)	40.561°N 105.151°W
B	Branson		37.0092°N 103.8815°W
C	Cañon City		38.443°N 105.25°W
D	De Beque		39.3377°N 108.20614°W
D	Del Norte		37.6719°N 106.3588°W
D	Dinosaur		40.2463°N 109.0064°W
F	Fruita	Fruita Monument High School	39.1334524°N 108.7336039°W
G	Golden		39.7521°N 105.2066°W
GV	Parachute	Grand Valley High School	39.461°N 108.0542°W
GM	Lakewood	Green Mountain High School	39.6964°N 105.1444°W
G	Gunnison		38.551°N 106.9144°W
H	Hotchkiss		38.7923°N 107.7008°W
LV	La Veta		37.5224°N 105.007°W
LHS	Sopris	Lincoln High School	37.1308°N 104.5724°W
L	Loma		39.1894°N 108.843°W
L	Lyons		40.2095°N 105.2656°W
M	Golden	Colorado School of Mines	39.7453°N 105.24°W
M	Manassa		37.1564°N 105.9323°W
M	Montrose		38.4642°N 107.8818°W
P (uncertain existence)	Pagosa Springs		37.2677°N 107.01°W (uncertain location)
P	Palisade		39.0914°N 108.3474°W
P	Paonia		38.8596°N 107.5976°W
P	Weston	Primero High School	37.1241°N 104.7936°W
R	Rangely	Rangely High School	40.0841°N 108.7999°W
R (uncertain existence)	Rifle		39.5301°N 107.7832°W (uncertain location)
S	Saguache		38.0837°N 106.1287°W
S	Salida		38.541°N 105.9876°W
SAN LUIS OLDEST TOWN IN COLO.	San Luis		37.2004°N 105.4281°W
S	Sanford		37.2487°N 105.8°W
SANTA MARIA	Santa Maria		39.4524°N 105.6307°W
SHS	Sheridan	Sheridan High School	39.639°N 105.0287°W
S	Silverton		37.8177°N 107.6644°W
SL	Westminster	Standley Lake High School	39.8844°N 105.0971°W
W	Gunnison	Western Colorado University	38.5274°N 106.9084°W

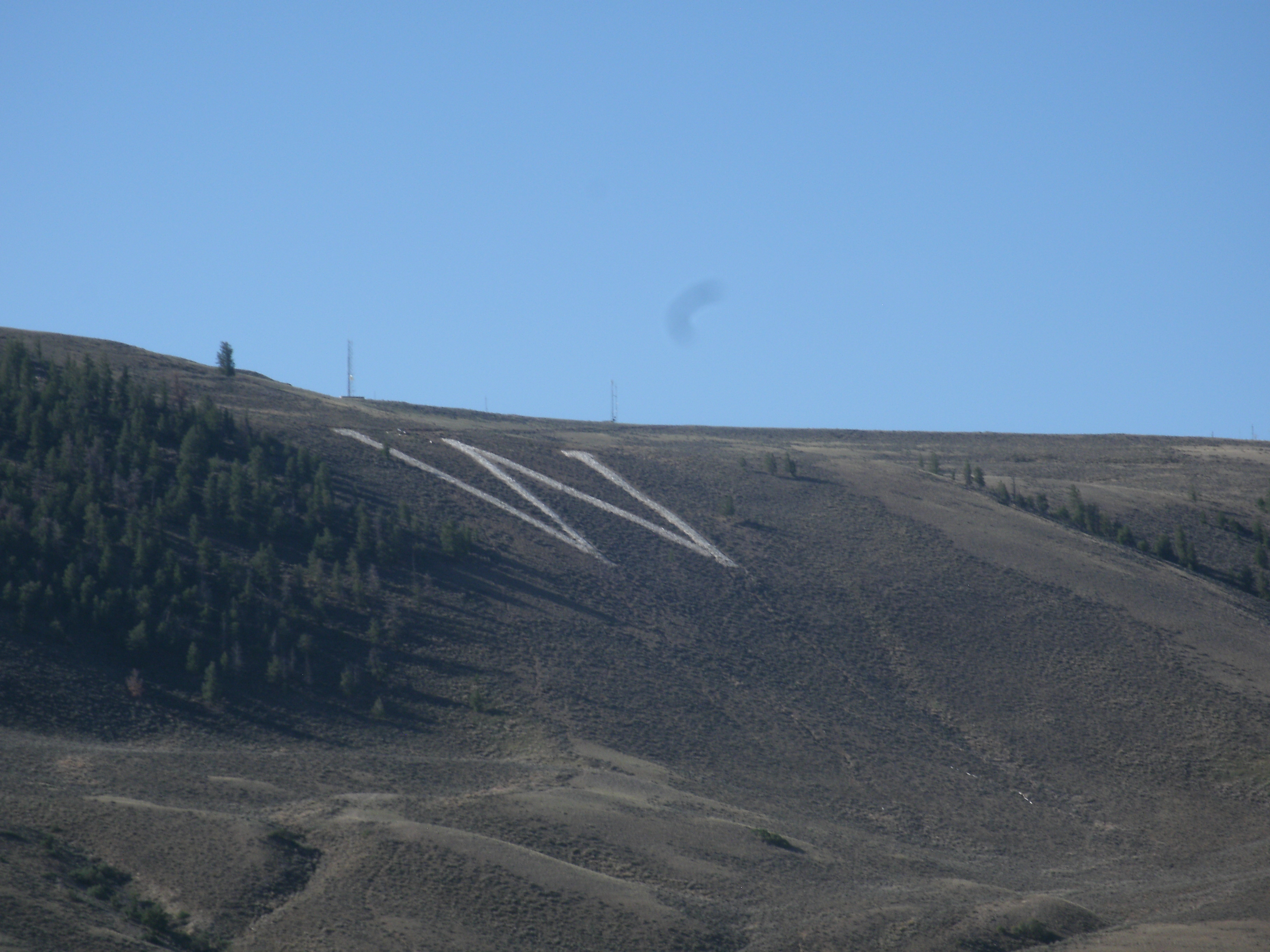
Western Colorado University's W Mountain

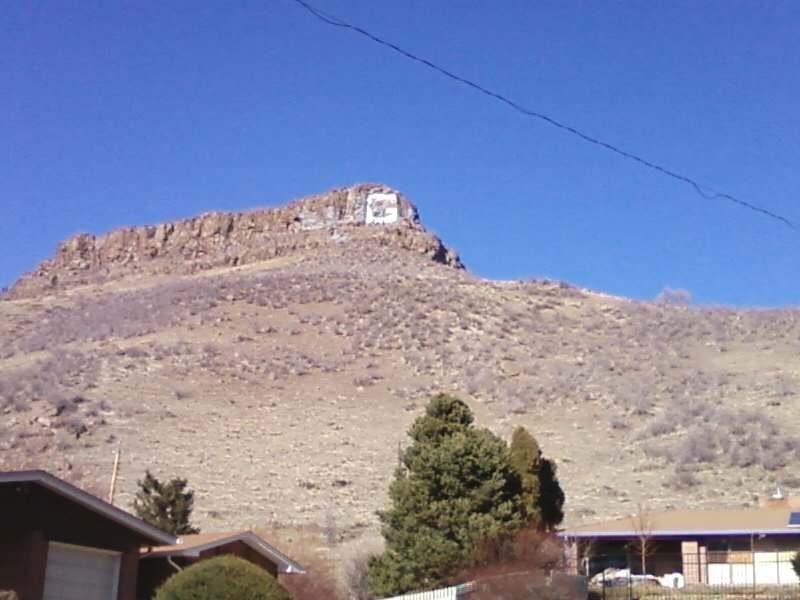
South Table Mountain Golden, Colorado

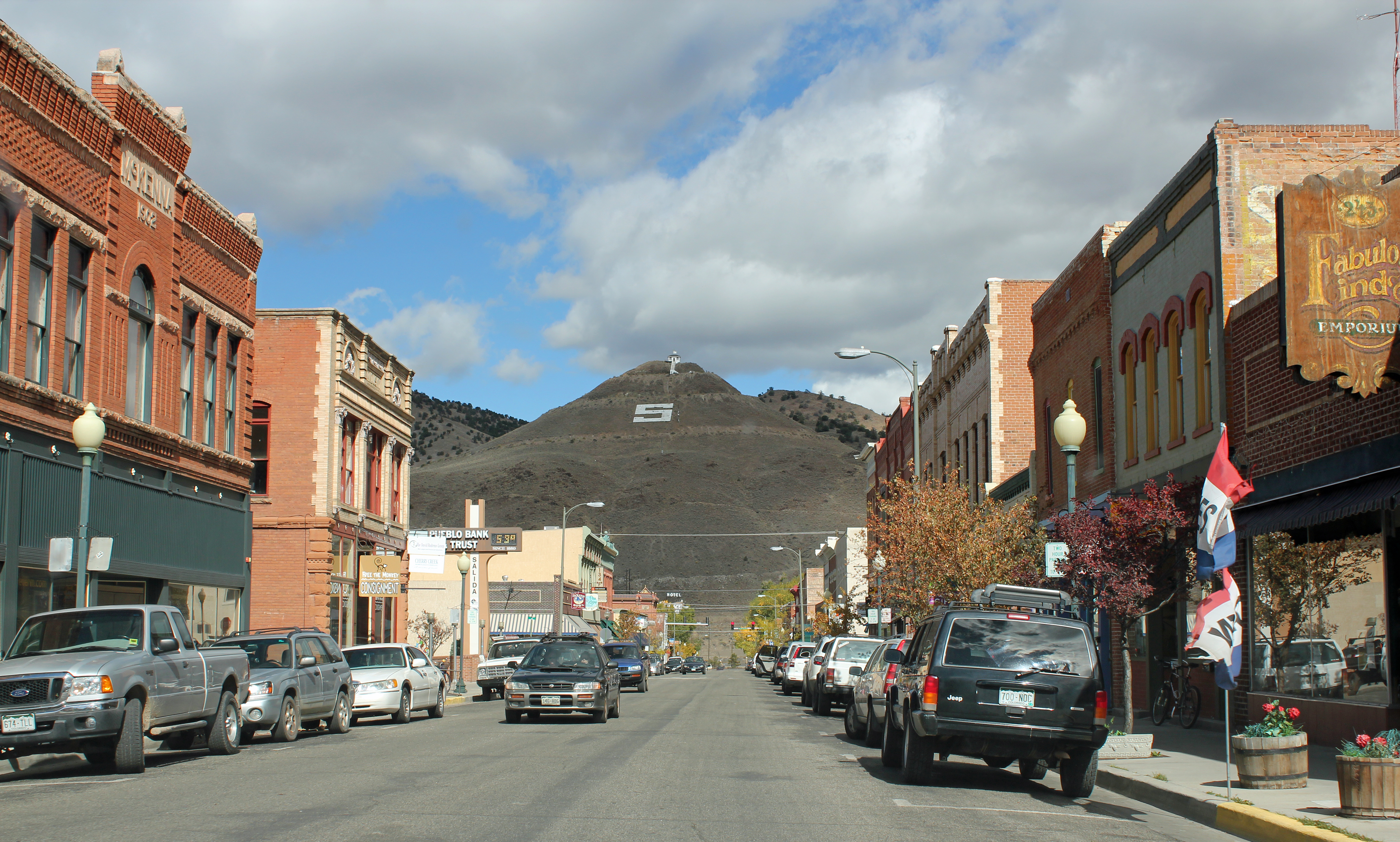
Salida Downtown Historic District in Salida, Colorado

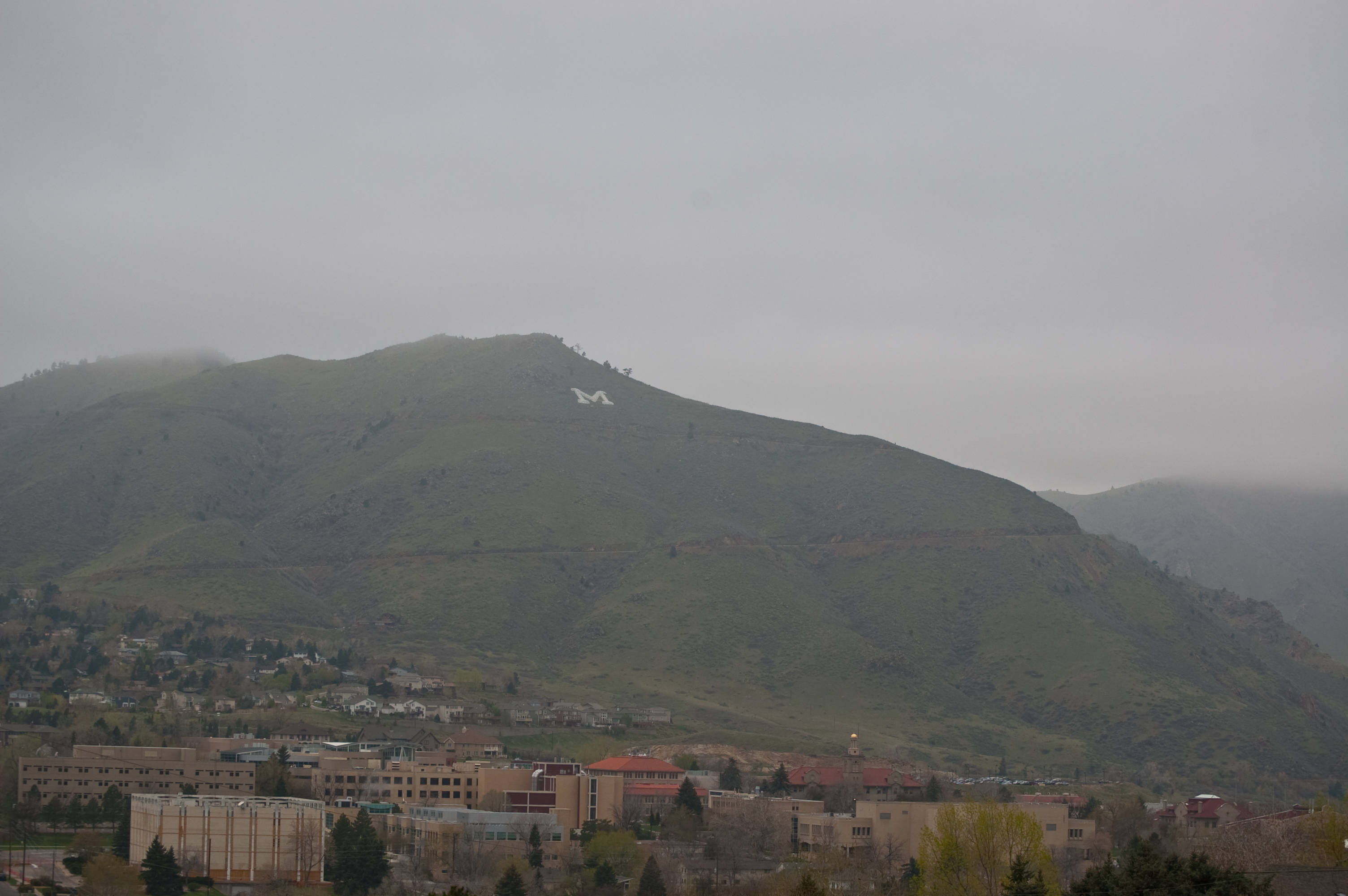
Mount Zion Mountain west of Golden, Colorado

=== Maryland ===
Monogram	Town	Description	Coordinates
MVGC (no longer exists)	Montgomery Village	Initialism of "Montgomery Village Golf Club"	39.1817904°N 77.1995232°W

=== New Mexico ===
At least 30 monograms, possibly 37

Monogram	Town	Description	Coordinates
A	Alamogordo		32.9002°N 105.911°W
A	Aztec		36.8357°N 108.0091°W
A	Aggies		32.292978°N 106.697936°W
B	Bernalillo		35.3209°N 106.5295°W
B	Bloomfield		36.7263°N 107.9799°W
C	Capitan		33.5373°N 105.584°W
C	Cimarron		36.4992°N 104.9222°W
C	Costilla		36.9888°N 105.5132°W
E	El Rito		36.36°N 106.1801°W
E (uncertain existence)	Espanola		35.9905°N 106.08°W (uncertain location)
F	Farmington		36.7637°N 108.1909°W
G	Grants		35.1685°N 107.864°W (uncertain location)
H	Las Vegas	New Mexico Highlands University	35.5905°N 105.2059°W
H	Hondo		33.3833°N 105.2537°W
KS	Kirtland	Kirtland Street High School	36.7591°N 108.3729°W
LA	Laguna	Laguna-Acoma	35.0537°N 107.4387°W
L	Lordsburg		32.3287°N 108.7268°W
LA	Los Alamos		35.9°N 106.3329°W
LA	Los Alamos		35.9°N 106.3329°W
LCC	Las Vegas	Luna Community College	
LL	Los Lunas		34.807°N 106.7914°W
L (uncertain existence)	Lyden		36.1463°N 106.0056°W (uncertain location)
M	Magdalena		34.0949°N 107.2512°W
MV	Ojo Caliente	Mesa Vista High School	36.3315°N 106.0391°W
M (uncertain existence)	Mora		35.974°N 105.3287°W (uncertain location)
A	Las Cruces	New Mexico State University Aggies	32.2926°N 106.699°W
M	Socorro	New Mexico Tech Miners	34.0723°N 106.9594°W
N	Newcomb	Newcomb Elementary School	36.282207°N 108.711151°W
NHS	Newcomb	Newcomb High School	36.278943°N 108.712849°W
P	Penasco		36.1765°N 105.6845°W
P	Pojoaque		35.892°N 106.021°W
Q	Questa		36.7099°N 105.5693°W
R	Las Vegas	Robertson High School	35.5805°N 105.2025°W
X (uncertain existence)	Santa Fe		35.6813°N 105.9467°W (uncertain location)
S (uncertain existence)	Shiprock		36.7907°N 108.6828°W (uncertain location)
J	Albuquerque	St. Joseph's College (closed)	35.1414°N 106.7714°W
T	Truth or Consequences		33.1191°N 107.2275°W
T	Tohatchi	Tohatchi High School	35.855677°N 108.747394°W
T	Tucumcari		35.1345°N 103.7°W
U (no longer exists)	Albuquerque	University of New Mexico	35.0812°N 106.4816°W
WM	Wagon Mound		36.0051°N 104.7019°W
D	Las Vegas	West Las Vegas High School Dons	35.5893°N 105.2047°W
W	Silver City	Western New Mexico University	32.8272°N 108.2489°W

=== Texas ===
Texas' 16 or more monograms are all in the westernmost mountainous, part of the state. There are six (in various states of repair) in El Paso alone, the most in any single city in the United States.

Monogram	Town	Description	Coordinates
A	Alpine		30.3527°N 103.6564°W
A	El Paso	Austin High School	31.7998°N 106.474°W
B	Balmorhea		30.9757°N 103.7199°W
B/E	El Paso	Bowie High School	31.7861°N 106.4796°W
C (removed?)	El Paso	Cathedral High School	31.7928°N 106.4813°W
E/B	El Paso	El Paso High School	31.7867°N 106.4803°W
FD	Fort Davis	2002? Letter F added	30.5784°N 103.893°W
I	El Paso	Irvin High School	31.8687°N 106.4630°W
J	El Paso	Jefferson High School	31.7865°N 106.4783°W
M	Marathon		30.2080°N 103.2222°W
M (uncertain existence)	Marfa		30.3088°N 104.0207°W (uncertain location)
M	McCamey		31.0998°N 102.1555°W
P (uncertain existence)	Presidio		29.5644°N 104.3689°W (uncertain location)
S	Sanderson		30.1467°N 102.4004°W
S	Shafter		29.8219°N 104.3041°W
SB	Sierra Blanca		31.1878°N 105.3495°W
SR	Alpine	Sul Ross State University	30.3662°N 103.6474°W
SAFETY FIRST!	Iraan		30°53′58″N 101°53′44″W
M	El Paso	UTEP Miners	31.7767°N 106.5088°W
V	Van Horn		31.0585°N 104.8606°W

=== Washington ===
Most of Washington's 18 to 19 monograms are in the arid Eastern part of the state.

Monogram	Town	Description	Coordinates
#7	Ephrata		47.3204°N 119.5714°W
A	Asotin		46.3407°N 117.0594°W
B	Burlington		48.4827°N 122.325°W
C	Cashmere		47.5294°N 120.4678°W
C	Clarkston		46.45°N 117.047°W
C	Colville		48.5631°N 117.9009°W
C	Creston		47.7449°N 118.5289°W
E	East Wenatchee		47.4428°N 120.2824°W
FOSS	Tacoma	Foss High School	47.236°N 122.4937°W
G	Goldendale		45.8016°N 120.7957°W
K	Kelso		46.1475°N 122.8962°W
KF	Kettle Falls		48.6164°N 118.04°W
K	Klickitat		45.8143°N 121.1493°W
LYLE	Lyle		45.69335°N 121.27352°W
L	Union Gap	La Salle High School	46.5317°N 120.4639°W
OK	Okanogan		48.3658°N 119.5876°W
R	Richland		46.2364°N 119.3126°W
R	Rosalia		47.228168°N 117.375771°W
S	Selah		46.631846°N 120.529443°W
T	Touchet		46.02528°N 118.67048°W

=== Wyoming ===
Between 24 and 25 monograms

Monogram	Town	Description	Coordinates
B	Burlington		44.466°N 108.4315°W
C	Cody		44.5262°N 109.101°W
D	Douglas		42.7524°N 105.3615°W
E	Evanston		41.2583°N 110.9559°W
F	Fairview		42.6807°N 111.0112°W
FORT WASHAKIE	Fort Washakie		43.0132°N 108.8805°W
G	Glenrock		42.8585°N 105.8511°W
GR	Green River		41.5147°N 109.4796°W
G	Greybull		44.5°N 108.0742°W
G	Guernsey		42.2644°N 104.7335°W
H (uncertain existence)	Hartville		42.3272°N 104.7272°W (uncertain location)
WORLDS LARGEST MINERAL HOT SPRING	Thermopolis	Hot Springs State Park	43.6562°N 108.1929°W
K	Kemmerer	This is an old location see below	41.7929°N 110.5265°W
K	Kemmerer	The new location.	41.788611°N 110.529444°W
L	Lovell		44.825629°N 108.297097°W
M	Meeteetse		44.1526°N 108.8703°W
M	Meeteetse		44.1526°N 108.8703°W
MV	Mountain View		41.2620°N 110.3408°W
R	Basin	Riverside High School	44.3797°N 108.0575°W
RS	Rock Springs		41.6°N 109.2136°W
*	Afton	Star Valley	42.7302°N 110.9118°W
S	Sunrise		42.3307°N 104.7149°W
T	Ten Sleep		44.0448°N 107.4467°W
T	Thermopolis		43.655°N 108.2064°W
W	Laramie	University of Wyoming	41.3287°N 105.5721°W
W	Worland		44.0109°N 108.0055°W
WBS	McNutt	Wyoming Boys' School	43.96658°N 108.03395°W

=== Other states ===
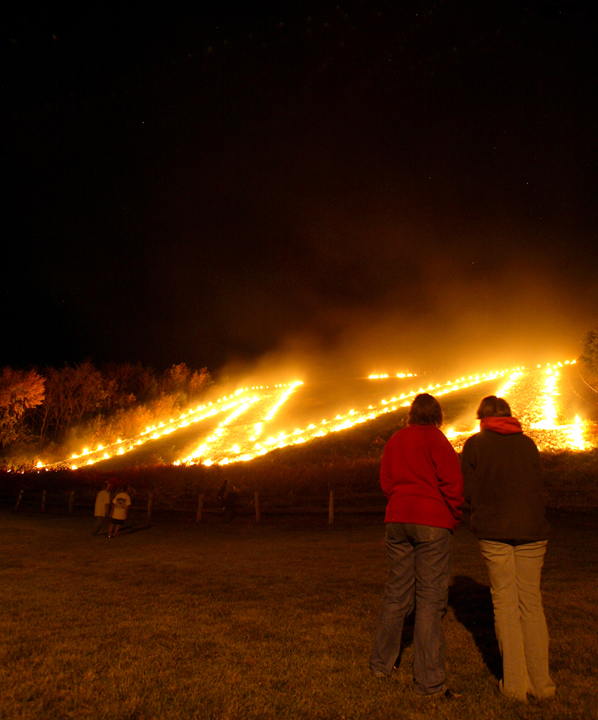
The "M" in Platteville, Wisconsin, lit by lanterns during the annual "M" Ball

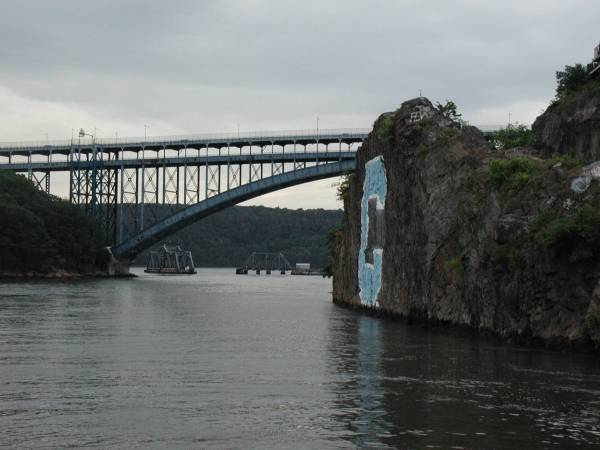
"C" Rock on the Harlem River, symbol of the Columbia University rowing team

Monogram	Town	State	Description	Coordinates
DAYTONA BEACH LPGA BLVD	Daytona Beach	Florida		29.2195°N 81.1035°W
PALM BAY	Palm Bay	Florida		28.0356°N 80.6574°W
L	Lahaina	Hawaii		20.8876°N 156.6415°W
KS	Manhattan	Kansas	Kansas State University (K built in 1921)	39.172°N 96.5522°W
MANHATTAN	Manhattan	Kansas	Manhattan (built in 1927)	39.19245°N 96.56281°W
OP	Ocean Pines	Maryland		38.3851°N 75.1782°W
NB	New Bedford	Massachusetts	(Built 2010's)	41.6383°N 70.9247°W
C	Chadron	Nebraska		42.8152°N 103.0028°W
POTTER	Potter	Nebraska		41.2041°N 103.3128°W
VALENTINE	Valentine	Nebraska		42.855412°N 100.541937°W
C	New York City (Manhattan)	New York	Columbia University	40.8761°N 73.919°W
HOWE CAVERNS	Cobleskill	New York	Howe Caverns	42.6956°N 74.3989°W
M (uncertain existence)	Poughkeepsie	New York	Marist University	41.7212°N 73.9477°W (uncertain location)
A	Alexander	North Dakota		47.8295°N 103.6376°W
HOME ON THE RANGE	Beach	North Dakota	Home on the Range Ranch	46.9435°N 103.8693°W
K (uncertain existence)	Kenmare	North Dakota		48.6764°N 102.0814°W (uncertain location)
MANDAN	Mandan	North Dakota		46.8336°N 100.8712°W
PRICE	Price	North Dakota		47.0818°N 100.9432°W
Z	Zap	North Dakota		47.2793°N 101.9328°W
AKRON	Akron	Ohio		41.0403°N 81.4572°W
HOBAN	Akron	Ohio	Archbishop Hoban High School	41.0622°N 81.498°W
LAZY S RANCH	Springer	Oklahoma	Lazy S Ranch	34.349°N 97.1424°W
WELCOME TO HERSHEY	Hershey	Pennsylvania	Hersheypark	40.2941°N 76.6623°W
H	Spearfish	South Dakota	Black Hills State University	44.5073°N 103.851°W
SMD	Rapid City	South Dakota	South Dakota School of Mines and Technology (M-Hill)	44.0883°N 103.2494°W
Σ Φ	Rapid City	South Dakota	South Dakota School of Mines and Technology Fraternal Organizations (Smelter Hill)	44.070798°N 103.201329°W
LU	Lynchburg	Virginia	Liberty University	37.3595°N 79.1597°W
St. Marys Springs	Fond du Lac	Wisconsin	St. Mary's Springs High School	43.7847°N 88.3847°W
M	Platteville	Wisconsin	University of Wisconsin-Platteville (formerly the Miners)	42.7636°N 90.4066°W

== More countries ==
Monogram	Town	Country	Description	Coordinates
LONGVIEW	Longview	Canada		50.5437°N 114.2189°W
PENTICTON	Penticton	Canada		49.51578024674693°N 119.57395238696091°W
113 51 137 151	Calgary	Canada	Military memorials in Battalion Park	51.021°N 114.173°W
MOUNT PANORAMA	Bathurst	Australia	Mount Panorama Circuit (and surrounding neighbourhood)	33.455°S 149.552°E
NZ	Bulford	United Kingdom	Writing beneath the Bulford Kiwi	51°11′38.84″N 001°42′54.20″W
Z (covered)	Wythenshawe	United Kingdom	Two "Z"s on the A5103 roundabout	53°23'57.21"N 2°16'06.23"W
주체 조선의 태양 김정은 장군 만세!	Ryanggang Province	North Korea	"Long Live General Kim Jong-un the Shining Sun!"	41.3084°N 128.1575°E
JESUCRISTO ES EL SEÑOR	Tijuana	Mexico		32.4753°N 116.9°W
CDJUAREZ LA BIBLIA ES LA VERDAD LEELA	Ciudad Juárez	Mexico	"CIUDAD JUAREZ THE BIBLE IS THE TRUTH READ IT"	31.7047°N 106.5189°W
B	Mexico City	Mexico	El Centro Escolar Benemérito de las Américas	19.539°N 99.1602°W
TU TOLEDO(no longer exists)"Google Earth".	Lima	Peru	Ate District, above the Estadio Monumental	12.052°S 76.9346°W
BEVENIDOS ATE(no longer exists)	Lima	Peru	Juventud Torre Blanca football club?	12.0014°S 76.9927°W
GB	Cape Town	South Africa		34.168362°S 18.861338°E
SUYO MT. TAPAO	Suyo, Ilocos Sur	Philippines		16.98982°N 120.48583°E
КЫРГЫЗСТАН	Boom Gorge	Kyrgyzstan		42.460286°N 76.014286°E
NE MULTU TÜRKÜM DIYENE - ATATURK	Kyrenia Mountains	Northern Cyprus		35.282281°N 33.371669°E

Messages are common on the bare mountains surrounding Lima, Peru; most of them are personal graffiti, not community symbols.

== See also ==
- Gozan no Okuribi, Japanese festival involving giant hillside bonfires in the shape of characters
