= List of hillside letters in Utah =

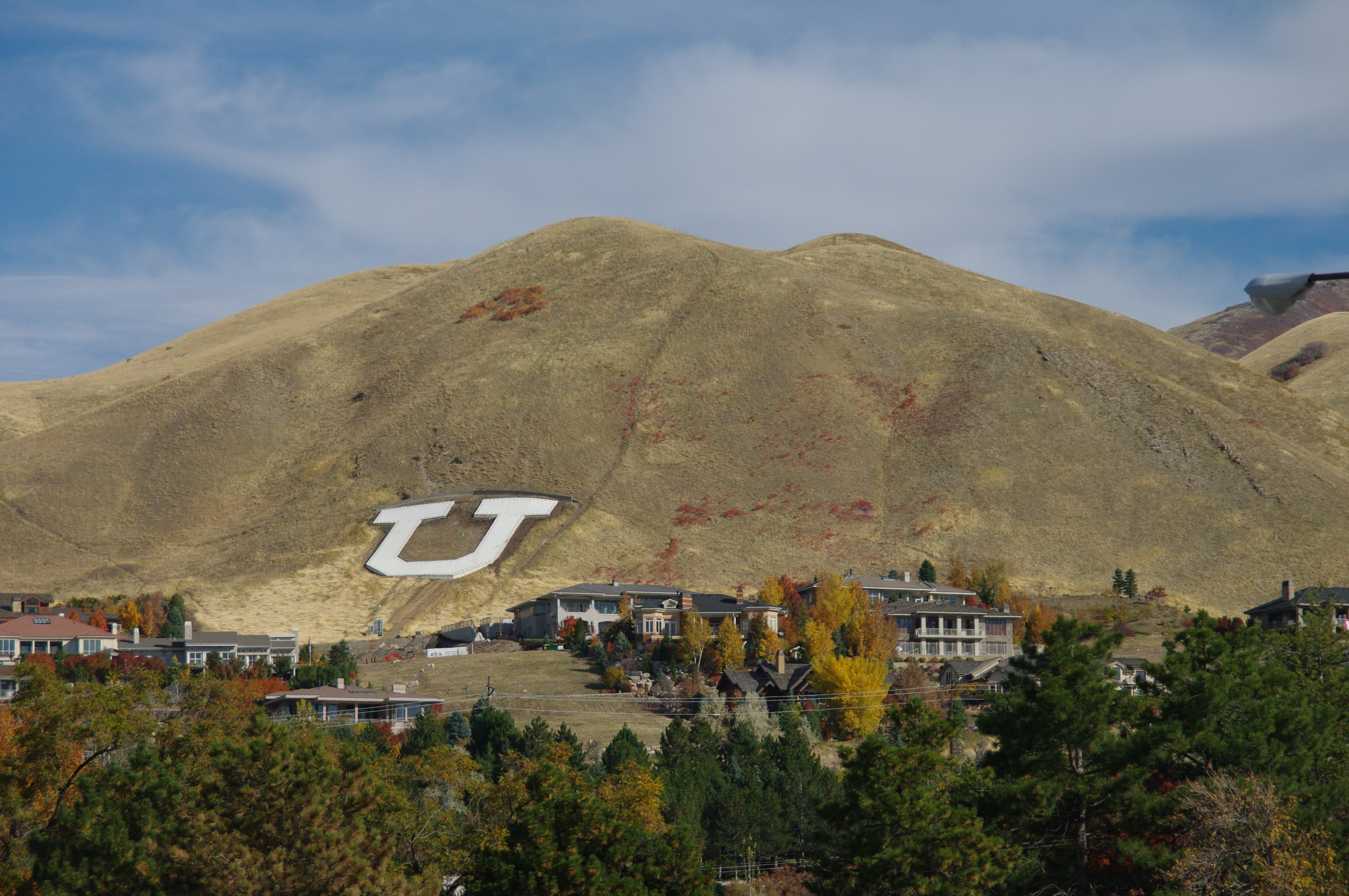
The Block U in Salt Lake City, trademark of the University of Utah

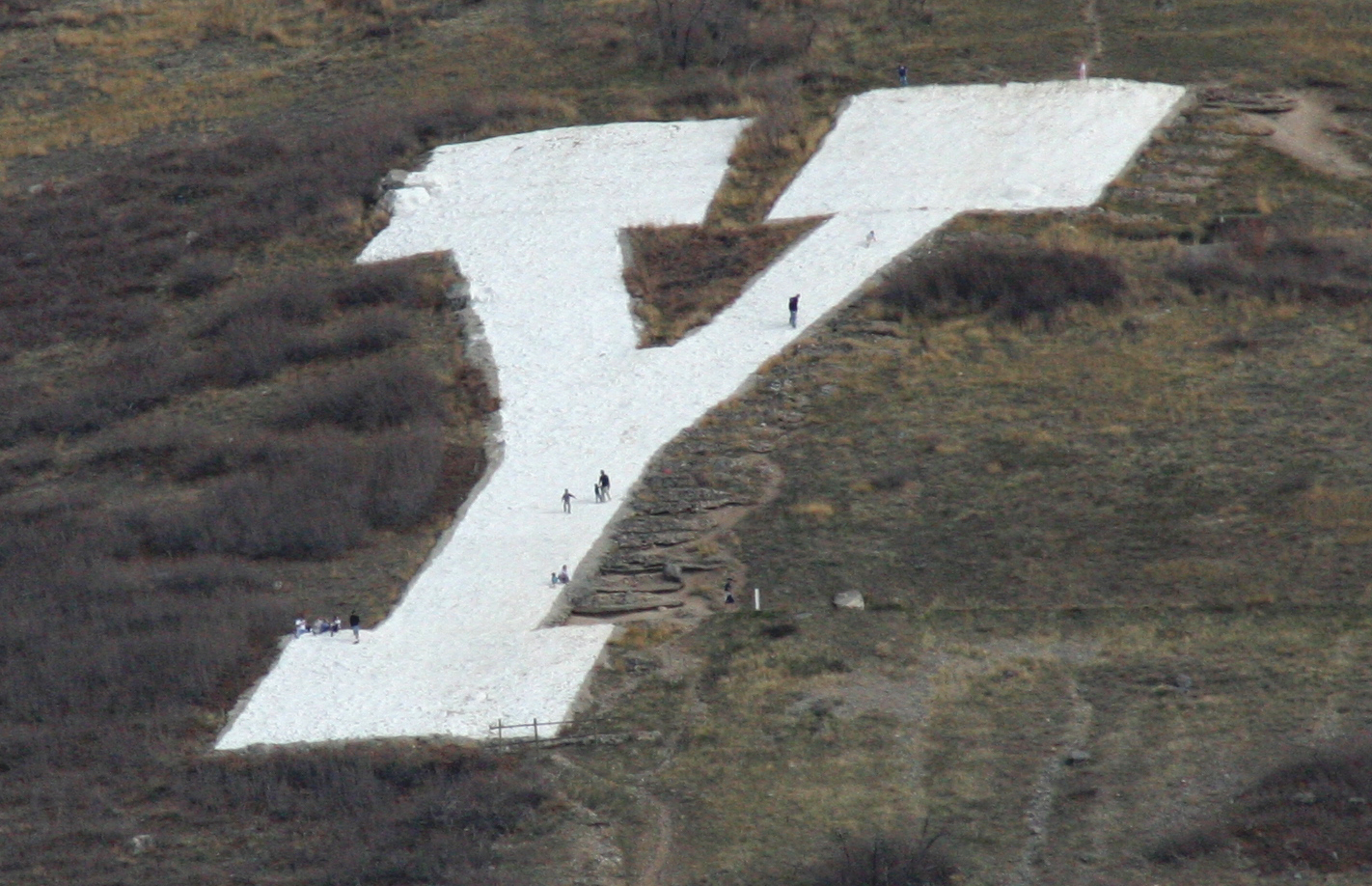
Hikers on Brigham Young University's Block Y in Provo

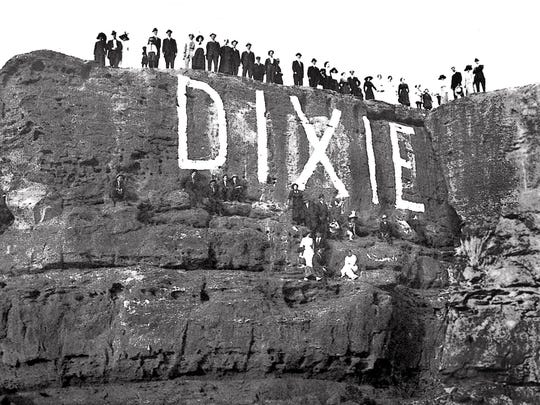
Repainted often, Dixie's full name as a hillside letter in St. George, Utah is somewhat more unique in that regard. Seen here in 1915†.

This is a list of hillside letters (also known as mountain monograms) in the U.S. state of Utah. Monograms in Utah include two of the oldest, at Brigham Young University (1906) and the University of Utah (1907). These symbols are so much a part of the culture that locals typically refer to the universities themselves as "The Y" and "The U", respectively. Across the state, there are at least 94 hillside letters, acronyms, and messages.

Monogram	Town	County	Construction year	Description	Location
A	Alton	Kane			37.4355°N 112.4960°W
ANETH	Aneth	San Juan			37.200893°N 109.150081°W
BR	Tremonton	Box Elder		Bear River High School	41.7593°N 112.2021°W
B	Beaver	Beaver		Beaver High School	38.2657°N 112.5825°W
BL	Ogden	Weber		Ben Lomond High School	41.2506°N 111.9308°W
B	South Jordan	Salt Lake		Bingham High School	40.5686°N 112.1165°W
B	Bountiful	Davis		Bountiful High School	40.8975°N 111.8463°W
B	Brigham City	Box Elder		Box Elder High School	41.52°N 111.9906°W
Y	Provo	Utah	1906	Brigham Young University	40.2483°N 111.6206°W
B	Cottonwood Heights	Salt Lake		Brighton High School	40.6096°N 111.7859°W
BV	Tropic	Garfield		Bryce Valley High School	37.6245°N 112.0629°W
CV	Cedar City	Iron		Canyon View High School	37.708299°N 113.055591°W
C	Price	Carbon		Carbon High School	39.6086°N 110.8125°W
C	Cedar City	Iron		Cedar High School	37.6426°N 113.0351°W
C	Cleveland	Emery			39.3482°N 110.8661°W
C	East Carbon	Carbon		For the former town of Columbia	39.5142°N 110.3854°W
C	Magna	Salt Lake		Cyprus High School	40.708°N 112.1322°W
DIXIE	St. George	Washington	1914†	Dixie High School	37.1159°N 113.5792°W
D	St. George	Washington		Historically named Dixie State University, now known as Utah Tech University	37.1081°N 113.5977°W
D	Duchesne	Duchesne			40.1658°N 110.4094°W
D	Dugway	Tooele			40.229409°N 112.7568354°W
EC	East Carbon	Carbon		East Carbon High School	39.559221°N 110.394149°W
E	Elsinore	Sevier			38.6849°N 112.1607°W
E	Emery	Emery			38.9286°N 111.2666°W
E	Enterprise	Washington			37.5525°N 113.7484°W
E	Escalante	Garfield			37.7884°N 111.582°W
FREMONT COUNTRY	Beaver County	Beaver		Rough painted rocks mostly hidden among the sagebrush on a shallow south-facing hill adjacent to I-15	38.1123°N 112.6479°W
FG	Fountain Green	Sanpete			39.6357°N 111.6326°W
G	Glenwood	Sevier			38.7738°N 111.9824°W
G	Moab	Grand		Grand County High School	38.5898°N 109.5509°W
G	Green River	Emery			38.9853°N 110.1682°W
G	Gunnison	Sanpete			39.1557°N 111.8357°W
G	Pleasant Grove	Utah	1920	Short for "Grovarian", or "Grove" – the original mascot and old school nickname, respectively.	40.3735°N 111.7013°W
GREEN VALLEY	St. George	Washington		neighborhood	37.096°N 113.6228°W
H	Henefer	Summit			41.0094°N 111.5028°W
H	Salt Lake City	Salt Lake		Highland High School	40.7306°N 111.8114°W
HOLE N' THE ROCK		San Juan		Hole N" The Rock (roadside attraction)	38.3911°N 109.4544°W
H	Hurricane	Washington			37.1742°N 113.2815°W
I	Provo	Utah		Independence High School	40.2456°N 111.6856°W
I	Brigham City	Box Elder		Intermountain Indian School (closed)	41.4829°N 111.9993°W
J	Nephi	Juab		Juab High School	39.7415°N 111.8182°W
K	Kanab	Kane			37.0482°N 112.5175°W
K	Kingston	Piute			38.2054°N 112.1819°W
L	Lapoint	Uintah			40.410375°N 109.788275°W
L	La Verkin	Washington			37.2008°N 113.2632°W
L	Leeds	Washington			37.2424°N 113.361°W
M	Mammoth	Juab			39.9317°N 112.1052°W
M	Manila	Daggett			40.9937°N 109.7294°W
M	Manti	Sanpete			39.2624°N 111.6101°W
M	Marysvale	Piute			38.4566°N 112.2143°W
S	Milford	Beaver			38.3986°N 113.0098°W (uncertain location)
M	Fillmore	Millard		Millard High School	38.9848°N 112.272°W
M	Minersville	Beaver			38.22036°N 112.9237°W
M	Morgan	Morgan			41.0283°N 111.659°W
M	Moroni	Sanpete			39.5434°N 111.5782°W
MC	Hyrum	Cache		Mountain Crest High School	41.6178°N 111.801°W
M	Mountain Home	Duchesne	2019?		40.38329°N 110.39112°W
NC	Richmond	Cache		North Cache Junior High School	41.9243°N 111.7867°W
NR	Laketown	Rich		North Rich Junior High School	41.8255°N 111.3127°W
NS	Salina	Sevier		North Sevier High School	38.9557°N 111.8219°W
NS	Coalville	Summit		North Summit High School	40.9083°N 111.3855°W
PC	Park City	Summit		Park City High School	40.6738°N 111.487°W
P	Parowan	Iron			37.8312°N 112.821°W
P	Payson	Utah		Payson High School	40.0249°N 111.7163°W
P	Alpine	Utah		Pack family	40.475°N 111.7695°W
P	Peterson	Morgan			41.1012°N 111.7678°W
P	Junction	Piute		Piute High School	38.2427°N 112.245°W
R	Richfield	Sevier			38.7614°N 112.1119°W
R	Roosevelt	Duchesne			40.311773°N 109.999249°W
SJ	Blanding	San Juan		San Juan High School	37.6414°N 109.4835°W
S	Shivwits	Washington			37.1836°N 113.7534°W
S	Holladay	Salt Lake		Skyline High School (Utah)	40.693°N 111.7842°W
SV	Smithfield	Cache		Sky View High School	41.821°N 111.7992°W
S	Ephraim	Sanpete		Snow College	39.3441°N 111.5391°W
SS	Monroe	Sevier		South Sevier High School	38.6316°N 112.1007°W
SS	Kamas	Summit		South Summit High School	40.6475°N 111.2689°W
S	Sterling	Sanpete			39.1945°N 111.6993°W
T	Tabiona	Duchesne			40.354956°N 110.698427°W
T	Eureka	Juab		Tintic High School	39.9509°N 112.1071°W
T	Tooele	Tooele		Tooele High School	40.5249°N 112.2482°W
T	Trenton	Cache			41.8993°N 111.9578°W
T	Tropic	Garfield			37.621°N 112.0819°W
TRIDELL	Tridell	Uintah			40.454203°N 109.845327°W
U	Uintah	Weber			41.1429°N 111.8995°W
U	Vernal	Uintah		Uintah High School	40.4386°N 109.6057°W
U	Salt Lake City	Salt Lake	1907	University of Utah	40.7794°N 111.8399°W
V	Orderville	Kane		Valley High School	37.2813°N 112.6371°W
V	Venice	Sevier			38.8029°N 111.9724°W
V	Centerville	Davis		Viewmont High School	40.9094°N 111.8557°W
W	Bicknell	Wayne		Wayne High School	38.347981°N 111.533718°W
W	Ogden	Weber	2024	Weber State University	41.19494°N 111.9308°W
W	Wendover	Tooele			40.7454°N 114.0297°W
WD	Partoun	Juab		West Desert High School	39.6459°N 113.9071°W
W	Montezuma Creek	San Juan		Whitehorse High School	37.2713°N 109.3059°W

†Originally painted as "1914 D", as a class "gift." The original plan was to paint over each year, but the next year the decision was made to paint and maintain "DIXIE"
