= The Big C =

The Big C may refer to:

- The Big C (TV series), a Showtime original series starring Laura Linney
- The Big "C", a concrete "C" overlooking the University of California, Berkeley

== See also ==
- Cancer
