= Hillside letters =

Type of geoglyph common in the Western United States

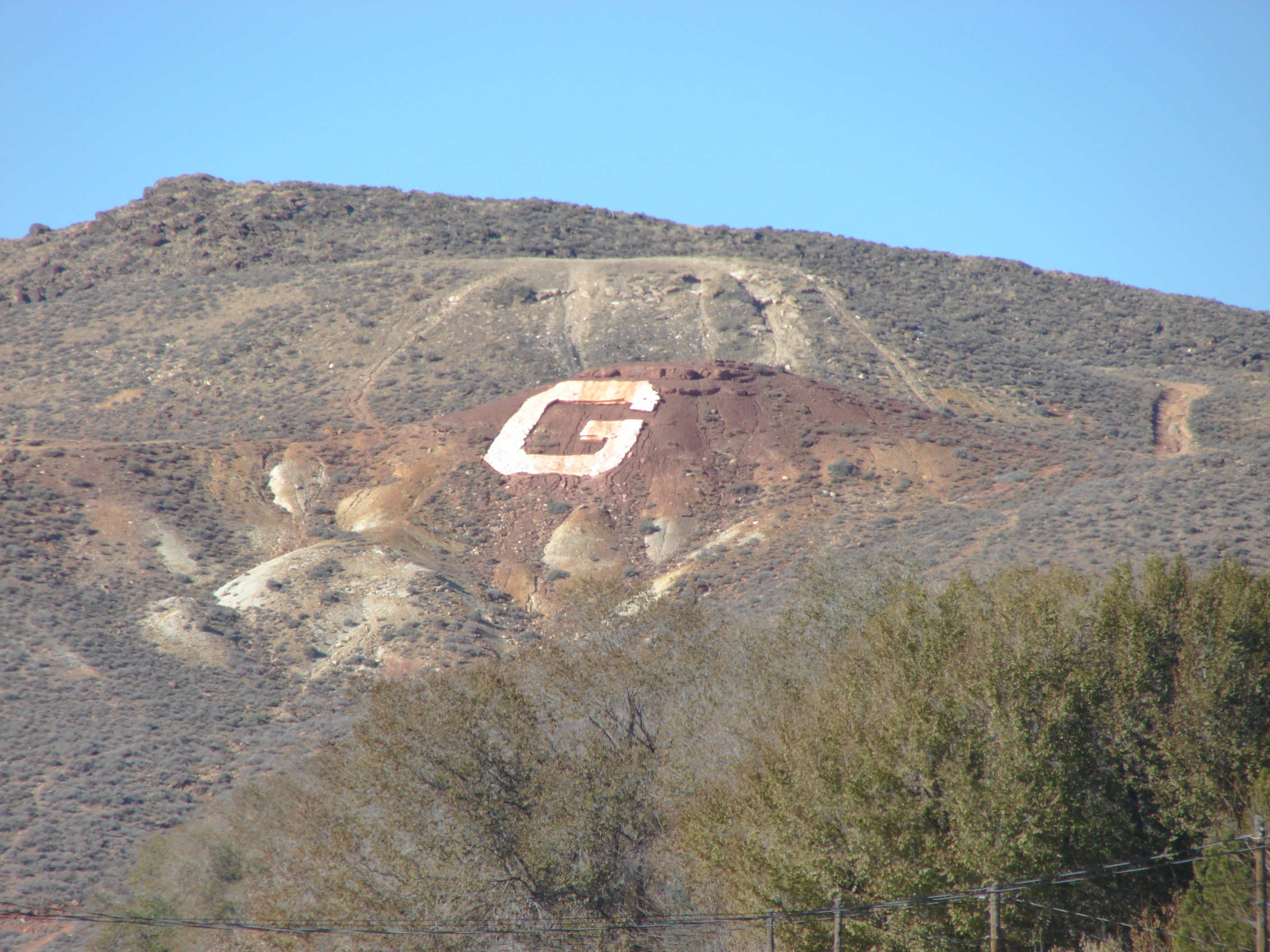
The letter G on Rocky Point, west of Gunnison, Utah

Hillside letters or mountain monograms are a form of hill figures common in the Western United States, consisting of large single letters, abbreviations, or messages displayed on hillsides, typically created and maintained by schools or towns. There are approximately 500 of these geoglyphs, ranging in size from a few feet to hundreds of feet tall. Hillside letters form an important part of the western cultural landscape, as they function as symbols of school pride and civic identity.

== History ==
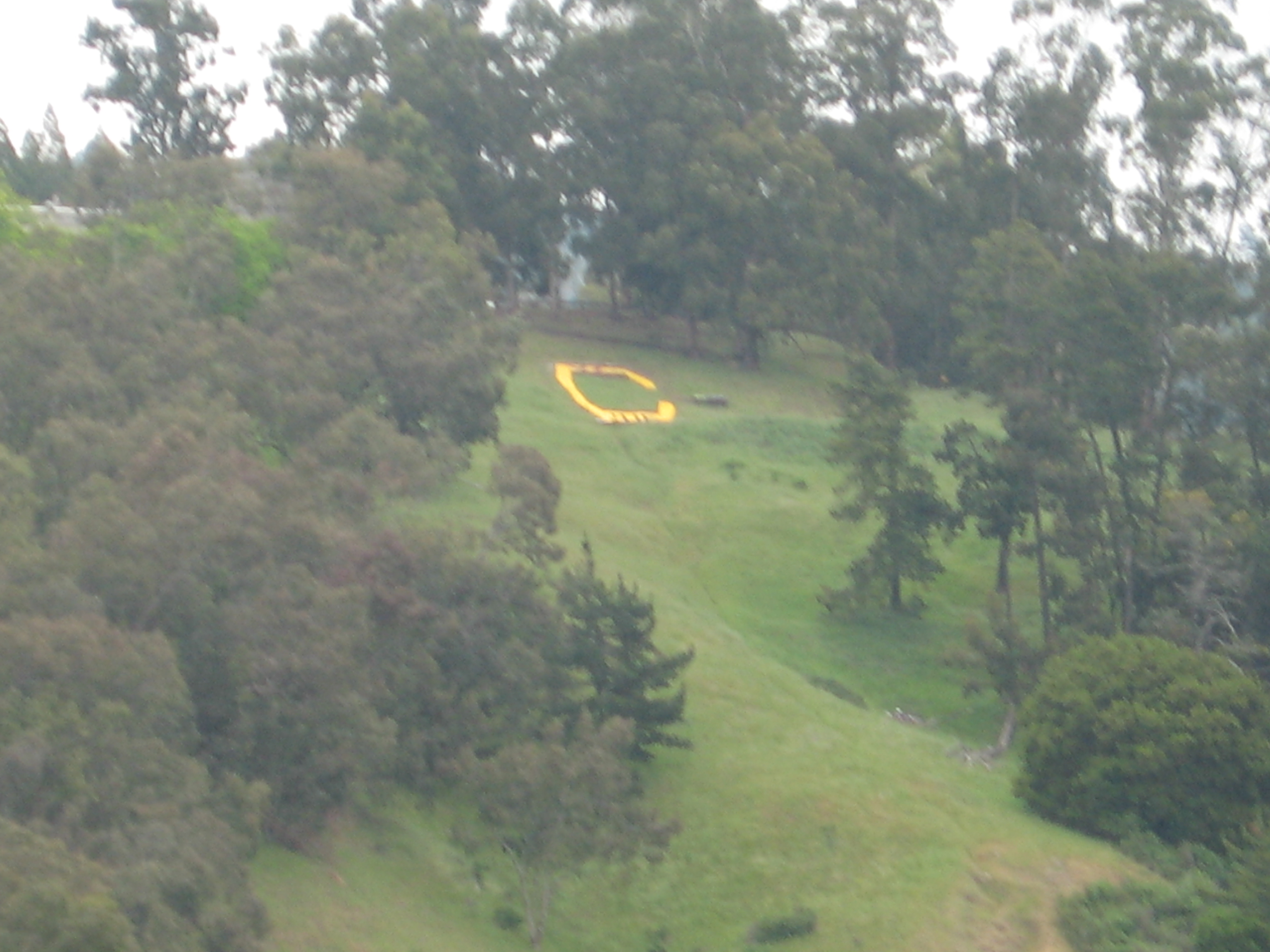
The Big C at the University of California, Berkeley

A myth that hillside letters were built to identify communities from the air for early pilots who air-dropped mail is untrue. The first three mountain monograms built were constructed to end rivalries between different graduating classes at universities. Letters have also been erected to celebrate winning teams, to commemorate the building of high schools, in memory of local community members, and as Boy Scout projects.

What may have been the first hillside letter was built by University of California-Berkeley students in March 1905. The letter C was constructed out of concrete and placed on Charter Hill overlooking the UC Berkeley. The UC Berkeley classes of 1907 and 1908 proposed this project as a means of ending the rivalry and the unruly physical encounters that had become a part of their annual rush each spring. The UC Berkeley yearbook recorded that the two classes would go down in the history of the University as those who sacrificed their class spirit for love of their alma mater.

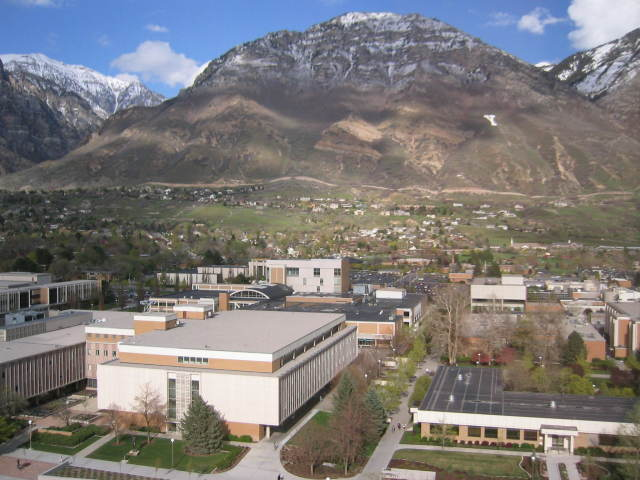
The Y overlooking the BYU campus in Provo, Utah

In 1906, Brigham Young University in Provo, Utah, proposed and surveyed the first three-lettered hillside emblem BYU, but reduced it to the single letter Y after realizing the amount of labor involved. The following year, the class rivalry of the sophomores and freshmen at the University of Utah in Salt Lake City produced a hillside U on Mount Van Cott overlooking Salt Lake City. The M of the Colorado School of Mines in Golden, Colorado, became the nation’s fourth hillside letter in 1908, and it has been illuminated every night since the early 1930s. A few years later, high schools began building hillside letters; the first one was a T for Tintic High School in Eureka, Utah, built in 1912.

By the 1920s and 1930s, letters were being rapidly constructed across the West. Although the pace has slowed since then, newly constructed letters continue to appear today. Meanwhile, many letters are fading due to lack of maintenance (especially in cases where the school that created the letter has closed), or have been removed outright due to environmental concerns or changing aesthetic preferences.

== Disputed first letter ==
Some sources state that the first hillside letter built is the "L" in 1904 representing Lahainaluna High School in Maui, Hawaii. However, according to local newspapers Lahaina News and Flux Hawaii, the L was built in 1929. Flux, in an editor's note, provides the correct date as 1929, stating that Lahainaluna High School has interviewed those who were students when it was built, and determined the date to be 1929. Lahaina News states that the “L” was created by a group of boarders who carved it into the Pu’u Pa’u Pa’u mountain. According to a different source, this 30 foot letter "L" at about the 2000 ft level on Mt Ball, part of the West Maui Mountains was created by students of Lahainaluna High School by clearing the plants and weeds and adding lime to prevent regrowth. The letter was restored in 2021.

== Distribution ==
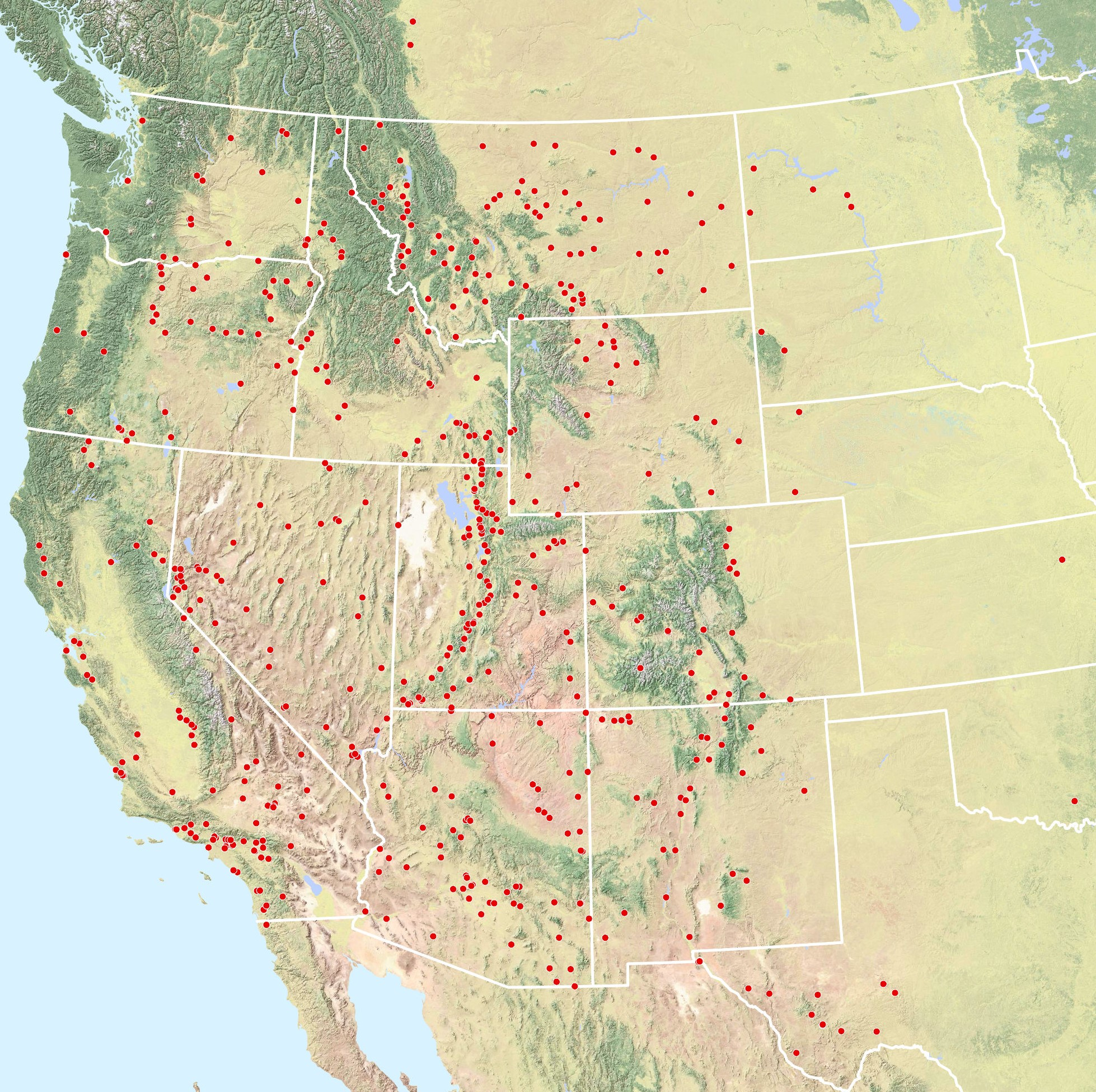
Distribution of Hillside Letters

More than 500 Hillside letters and messages can be found across the United States; the total is approximate because the various published lists do not completely coincide, and extensive travel would be needed to verify all rumored letters. The most prolific states are (numbers are approximate):

- Montana: 127 (detailed list)
- Utah: 94 (detailed list)
- California: 81 (detailed list)
- Arizona: 59 (detailed list)
- Nevada: 47 (detailed list)
- Oregon: 36 (detailed list)
- Idaho: 34 (detailed list)
- New Mexico: 32 (detailed list)
- Colorado: 24 (detailed list)
- Wyoming: 22 (detailed list)
- Washington: 20 (detailed list)
- Texas: 17 (detailed list)

The densest concentrations are in Utah and Idaho and surrounding the Los Angeles Basin. A few letters may be found east of these states, such as the Platte Mound M in Platteville, Wisconsin and a C (for Columbia University) along the Harlem River in New York City. The phenomenon has spread to Alberta, Canada; Hawaii; and Australia.

== Construction ==
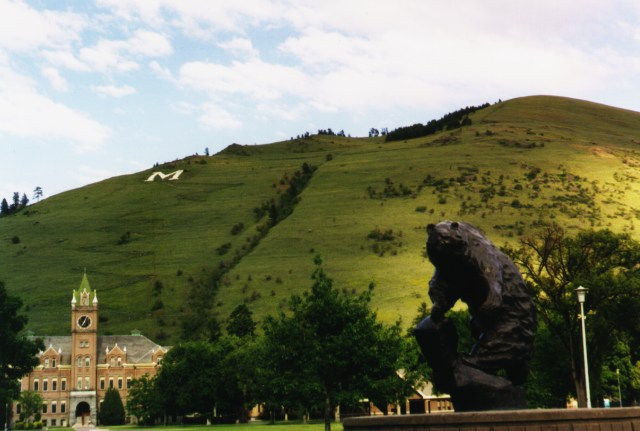
"The M" overlooks the University of Montana from Mount Sentinel in Missoula.

Hillside letters are typically built in three different manners:

- Built-up letters made from rocks and concrete are the most common. Other materials such as wood, old car tires, metal, and vinyl have also been used. The M in Missoula, Montana, for the University of Montana, is an example of a built-up letter.
- Painted letters are typically found on bare rock faces and cliffs, as is the G in The Gap, Arizona.
- Cutout letters, the least common, are formed by removing the vegetation to create a letter; the R for the University of Redlands in Redlands, California, is an example.

These emblems can range in size from 10 or 15 feet tall to hundreds of feet tall. The largest include the L for Lassen High School in Susanville, California (580 feet long), the R for University of Redlands in Redlands, California (430 feet long), the W for Western Colorado University in Gunnison, Colorado (420 feet long), and the Y for Brigham Young University in Provo, Utah (380 feet long). In addition to single letters and abbreviations, full messages have been placed on hillsides using similar methods, such as "SAN LUIS OLDEST TOWN IN COLO." in San Luis, Colorado, "WELCOME TO HERSHEY" in Hershey, Pennsylvania, and "MOUNT PANORAMA" (with "BATHURST" temporarily added on at least two occasions) in Bathurst, New South Wales, Australia. The famous HOLLYWOOD sign built in 1923 to advertise the Hollywoodland Real Estate Group is not technically a hillside letter, but rather a billboard.

Every letter of the alphabet is found as a single letter on a hillside except for X. Two X’s do appear within words on hillsides: DIXIE in St. George, Utah, and PHOENIX near Phoenix, Arizona. The letter M is the most common hillside letter.

== List of notable hillside letters ==
- Battalion Park, Calgary, Alberta, Canada
- The Big "C", Berkeley, California
- Block U, Salt Lake City, Utah
- C-Rock, New York City
- Canisteo Living Sign
- Groudle Glen railway station, Isle of Man – features "GROUDLE".
- Mount Sentinel, University of Montana, Missoula, Montana
- Mount Zion, Golden, Colorado
- Rock M, Columbia, Missouri
- Platte Mound M, Platteville, Wisconsin
- South San Francisco hillside sign, South San Francisco, CA
- Tempe Butte (Known locally as 'A Mountain'), Tempe, Arizona
- Y Mountain, Provo, UT

== See also ==
- Gozan no Okuribi
- Nazca lines
