= List of hillside letters in California =

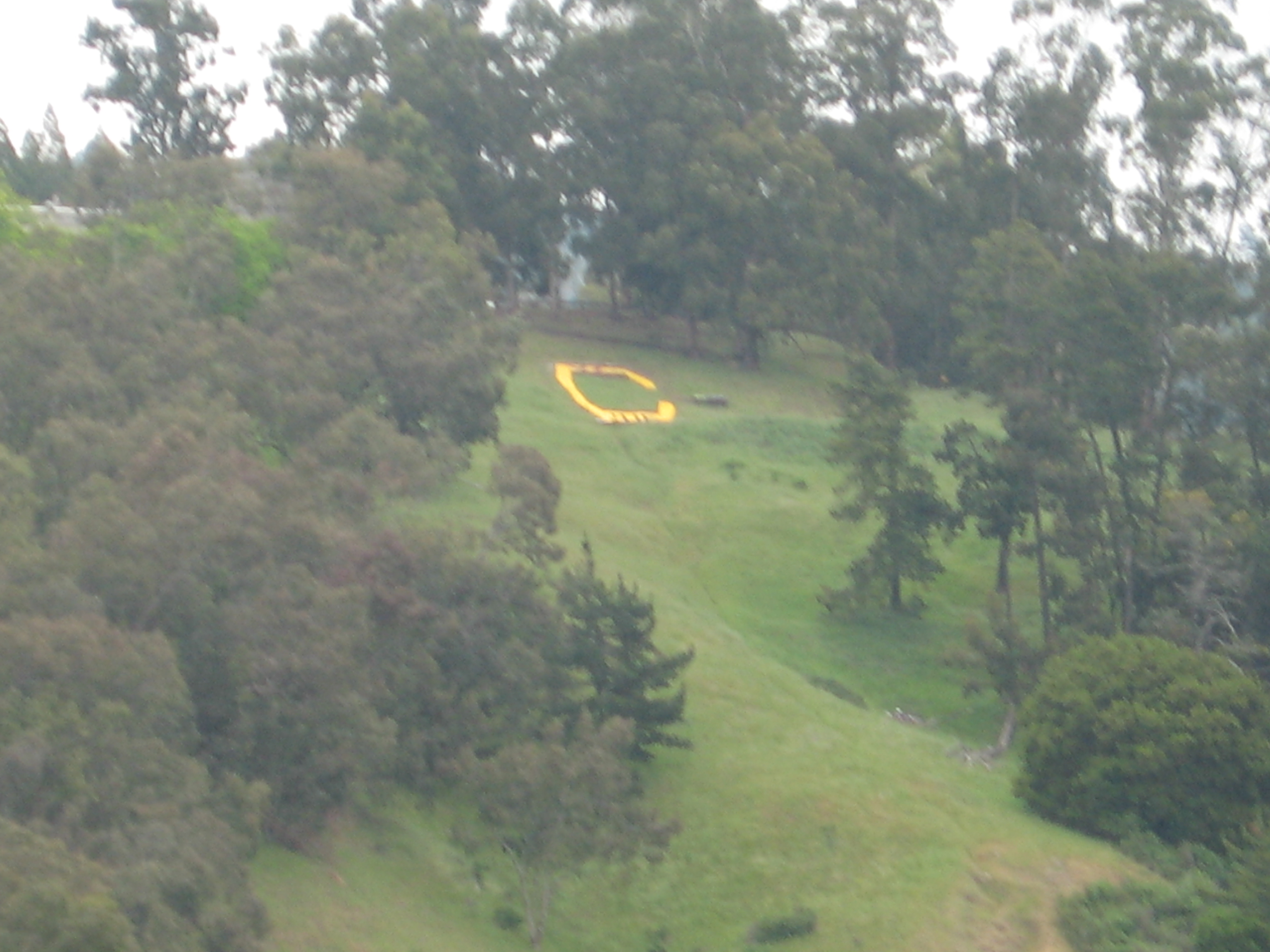
The Big C at the University of California at Berkeley

This is a list of hillside letters (also known as mountain monograms) in the U.S. state of California. There are at least 83 hillside letters, acronyms, and messages in the state, possibly as many as 90, although some have been removed in recent years. Among these are the oldest letter (the C in Berkeley, 1905) and the largest letter (the L in Susanville, almost 600 feet long).

Monogram	Town	Description	Location
A	Agoura Hills		34.1538°N 118.7499°W
A	Azusa		34.1551°N 117.8919°W
A (Planning)	Acton		34.4805556°N 118.1741667°W
B	Banner		33.0694°N 116.5441°W
B	Bard		32.8373°N 114.5287°W
B	Barstow		34.9008°N 117.0333°W
B	Boron		35.0145°N 117.6605°W
B	Burbank		34.2016°N 118.2959°W
B	Yucca Valley	Burnt Mountain	34.1054°N 116.4131°W
B	Ridgecrest	Burroughs High School	35.6554°N 117.6127°W
C	Daggett	Calico High School	34.8736°N 116.8949°W
C	San Juan Capistrano	Capistrano High School	33.5093°N 117.6762°W
C	Coalinga		36.1366°N 120.4073°W
C	Coleville		38.5726°N 119.515°W
C	Rancho Cucamonga	Chaffey College	34.174294°N 117.576846°W
C	Riverside	University of California, Riverside	33.9713°N 117.3022°W
C	Berkeley	University of California, Berkeley	37.8746°N 122.2496°W
C (Planning)	Chilcoot-Vinton		39.8082332°N 120.1194413°W
CALICO	Calico		34.955°N 116.8635°W
CLU	Thousand Oaks	California Lutheran University	34.2333°N 118.8797°W
CPP	Pomona	Cal Poly Pomona	34.0595°N 117.8269°W
CSD	Berkeley	above the now-UC Berkeley-owned Clark Kerr campus	37.86430°N 122.24414°W
DV	Shoshone	Death Valley	35.9809°N 116.276°W
D	Dinuba	Dinuba High School	36.5819°N 119.3465°W
d	Duarte		34.1546°N 117.95°W
E	Escondido		33.165°N 117.102°W
[Eagle]	San Luis Obispo	Camp San Luis Obispo (Nat. Guard Base)	35.3309°N 120.7208°W
EC	Lakeside	El Capitan High School	32.8678°N 116.9265°W
F	Fillmore		34.4091°N 118.893°W
G	El Cajon	Grossmont High School	32.78°N 116.9864°W
GOLDSTONE	Fort Irwin	Goldstone Observatory	35.3028°N 116.8062°W
H	Glendale	Hoover High School	34.1789°N 118.2562°W
H	Hornbrook		41.9111°N 122.5462°W
K	Kelseyville		38.9835°N 122.7958°W
L	Laguna Beach	Laguna Beach High School	33.5450°N 117.7744°W
L	Susanville	Lassen High School	40.4465°N 120.6528°W
L	Laytonville		39.6965°N 123.4656°W
L	Lemon Cove		36.3878°N 119.0094°W
L	Lindsay		36.2173°N 119.0516°W
L	Loyalton		39.6936°N 120.2056°W
L	Ludlow		34.7186°N 116.1747°W
LA	Hacienda Heights	Los Altos High School	34.0184°N 117.9962°W
L^{24}P	Lone Pine		36.6027°N 118.0875°W
LMU	Los Angeles, California	Loyola Marymount University	33.9725°N 118.4182°W
LV	Lee Vining		37.9553°N 119.1259°W
M	Maricopa		35.0361°N 119.412°W
M	San Luis Obispo	Mission Preparatory Academy	35.2824°N 120.6747°W
M	Monrovia		34.1582°N 118.0145°W
M	Moreno Valley		33.9597°N 117.2789°W
M	Banning	Morongo Valley	33.957778°N 116.834722°W
MB	Morro Bay		35.3772°N 120.8502°W
MSAC	Walnut	Mount San Antonio College	34.0413°N 117.8423°W
NILES	Fremont	neighborhood	37.5828°N 121.9732°W
O	Oroville		39.5472°N 121.5509°W
P	San Bernardino	Pacific High School	34.1334°N 117.2652°W
P	San Luis Obispo	California Polytechnic State University	35.3028°N 120.6518°W
P	San Marcos	Palomar College	33.1557°N 117.173°W
P [now over grown]	Claremont	Pomona College	34.13305°N 117.72527°W
P	Porterville		36.0285°N 118.9649°W
P	Portola		39.805°N 120.4453°W
Q	Quincy		39.9386°N 120.9335°W
R	Randsburg		35.3689°N 117.6476°W
R	Redlands	University of Redlands	34.1834°N 117.105°W
R	Reedley		36.6913°N 119.4249°W
ROCKAWAY BEACH	Pacifica		37.612778°N 122.49694°W
S (removed about 2010)	Morgan Hill	Ann Sobrato High School	37.1457°N 121.6814°W
S	San Jacinto		33.8204°N 116.9397°W
S	Sanger		36.6945°N 119.426°W
S	Santa Clarita	Saugus High School	34.4416°N 118.5209°W
S	Seville		36.5137°N 119.2121°W
S	Shandon		35.6661°N 120.3826°W
S	Jamestown	Sonora High School	37.880369°N 120.503952°W
SL	San Luis Obispo	San Luis Obispo High School	35.2834°N 120.6463°W
SP	Santa Paula		34.326°N 119.0423°W
SOUTH SAN FRANCISCO THE INDUSTRIAL CITY	South San Francisco		37.6634°N 122.4181°W
SMC	Moraga	St. Mary's College	37.8375°N 122.1102°W
SV	Yermo	Silver Valley High School	34.8959°N 116.8945°W
T	Tehachapi		35.1348°N 118.4179°W
T	Templeton		35.5462°N 120.7132°W
T	Trona		35.7847°N 117.3953°W
U	Ukiah		39.1519°N 123.2390°W
V	Ventura		34.2864°N 119.2672°W
V	Victorville		34.5316°N 117.2935°W
VC	Ventura	Ventura College	34.2861°N 119.2357°W
W	Weed		41.4433°N 122.3864°W
W	Whittier		33.978°N 118.0238°W
W	Willits		39.4453°N 123.3028°W
W	Woodlake		36.4321°N 119.0758°W
Y (fade)	Yucaipa	Yucaipa High School	34.0412°N 117.0882°W
