= Platte Mound M =

Public artwork of whitewashed stones in Wisconsin, United States

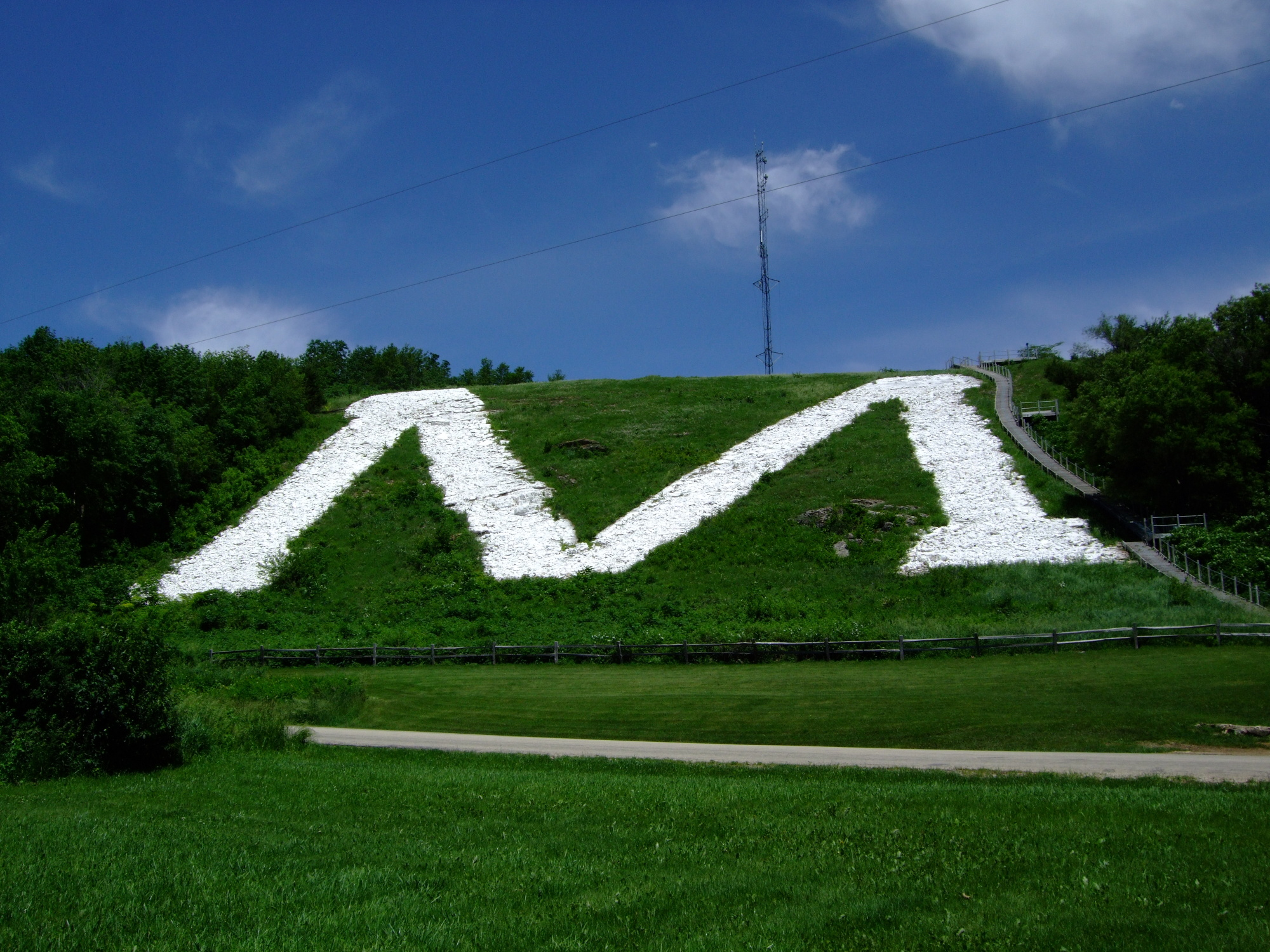
- A close view of the Platte Mound M.
- Artist: Students of the Wisconsin Mining Trade School
- Year: 1937
- Medium: Whitewashed limestone
- Subject: The letter M
- Dimensions: 73 m × 65 m (241 ft × 214 ft)
- Location: Near Platteville, Wisconsin; 42.763713°N 90.406666°W
- Website: uwplatt.edu/mound-or-m

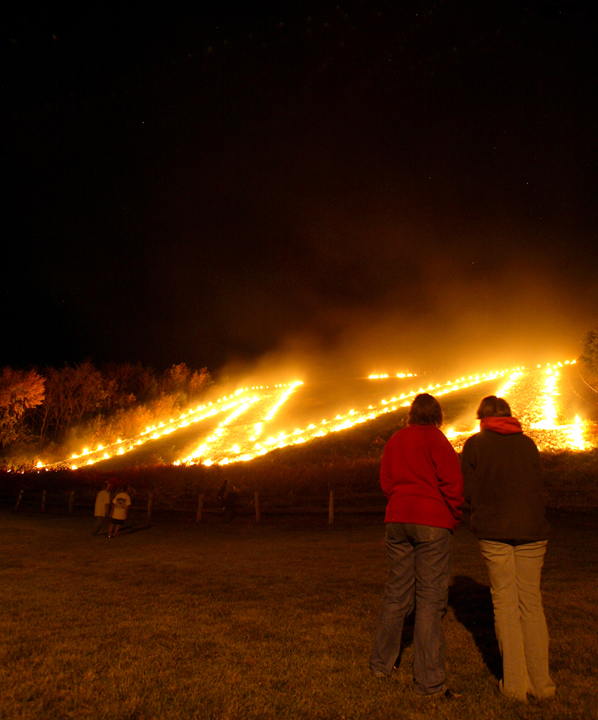
The "M" lit by lanterns during the annual "M" Ball.

The Platte Mound M is the letter "M" written using whitewashed stones on Platte Mound about four miles east of Platteville, Wisconsin, United States. It is the largest hillside letter "M" in the world. The letter is 241 feet (73 m) high, 214 feet (65 m) wide, with legs 25 feet (7.6 m) wide.

== History ==
University of Wisconsin-Platteville students Raymond Medley and Alvin Knoerr worked at a Colorado mine in the summer of 1936, where they saw a large letter "M" on the side of Mount Zion in Golden, Colorado that stood for the Colorado School of Mines. They believed that a larger "M" should be written on the Platte Mound to represent Platteville miners. They created the first letter on the mound that winter. They wrote the letter "M" in deep snow, and it was visible for several weeks when a cold spell hit the area. The letter "M" was selected for the School of Mines at the university. Several students who went hiking in the same spot after the snow melted used large rocks to build one leg of a letter "M" while resting.

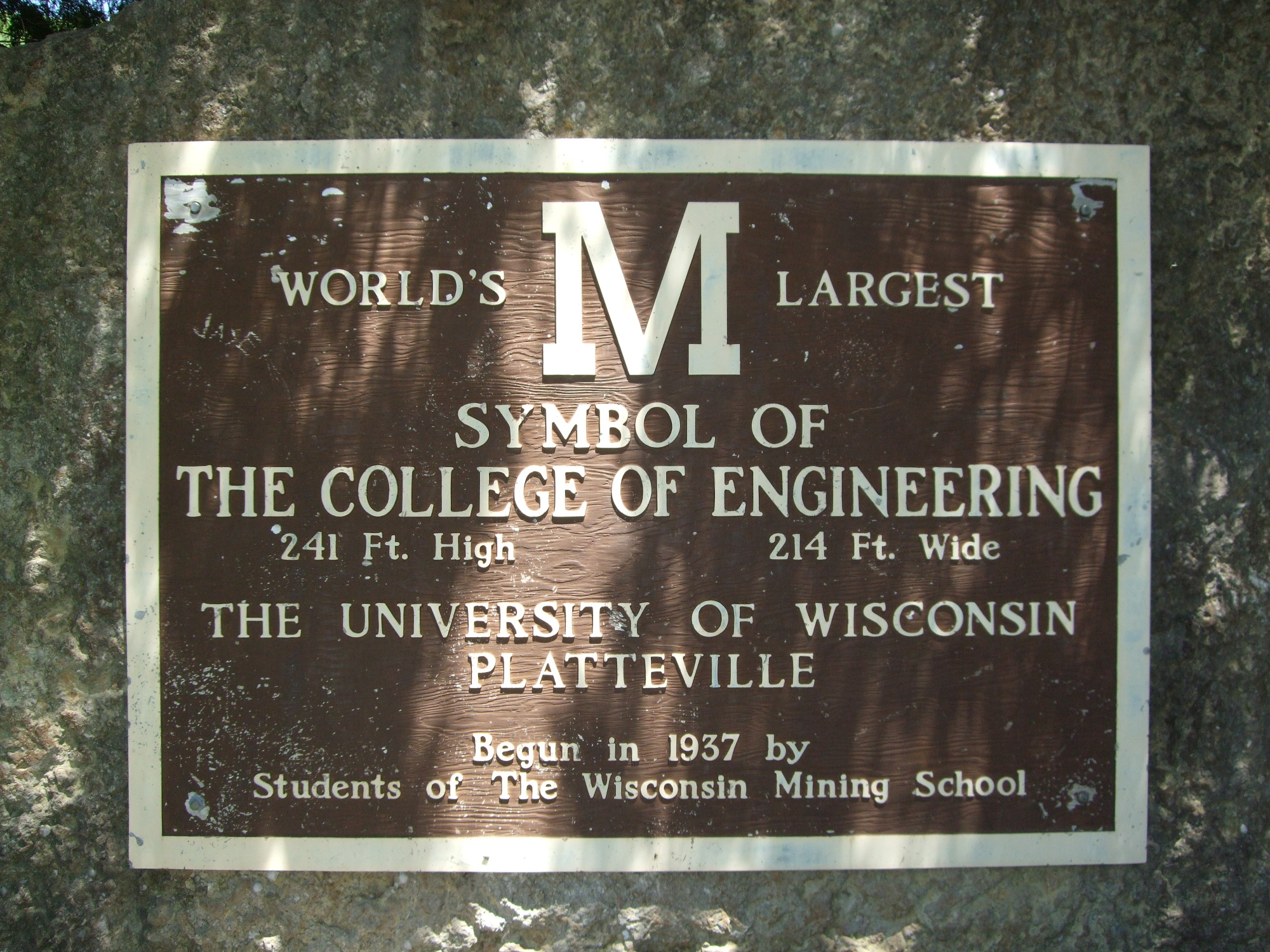
Mound M plaque

The unfinished letter was so pronounced that engineering department head, H. B. Morrow, declared a field day for the department personnel and engineering students to complete the "M". Seniors surveyed the letter to make sure that it was larger than the "M" in Colorado. Underclassmen constructed the letter using borrowed picks, crowbars, and wheelbarrows from a local CCC camp. The letter was constructed from limestone found on the mound. Morrow and other professors drove several miles away to inspect the work from a distance, and they recommended changes to counteract distortion from the slope of the mound. Work was completed about six months later and the letter was celebrated at that year's homecoming on October 16, 1937. It was lit from a torch that was relayed 4.5 miles (7.2 km) from the school's Tech building. The illuminated letter was visible from 28 miles away.

Before 1940, the letter was lit only for homecoming. After World War II, the tradition changed to include lighting the letter on the evening of the spring Miner's Ball. The letter was neglected during World War II when few men were available. Female students noticed the general disrepair of the letter, which led to a custom of cleaning the letter in the fall and whitewashing it in April on the Thursday before the Miner's Ball. Life magazine reporter Francis Miller attended the April 29, 1949 lighting, where he witnessed 250 quart cans with corncobs lit around the outline of the letters. It took 23 minutes to relay the torch to the mound. His story appeared in Life on May 23, 1949.

Platte Mound is a one mile long and half mile wide mound that rises 450 feet (140 m) above its surroundings. The college had received permission to construct the letter from property owner William Snow. A Mr. Clausen from Racine, who later purchased the land, then donated it to the Board of State College Regents. The letter has been maintained by engineering students at the university since the mining engineering department closed in the 1990s. As of 2008, the Society of Automotive Engineers student organization at UW-Platteville performs all annual maintenance, including brush and tree removal in fall, lighting it for Homecoming in fall with fiberboard wicks in coffee cans of kerosene, and whitewashing it in spring.

== See also ==
- Hillside letters
