= Venice, Utah =

Unincorporated community in the state of Utah, United States

- Unincorporated community
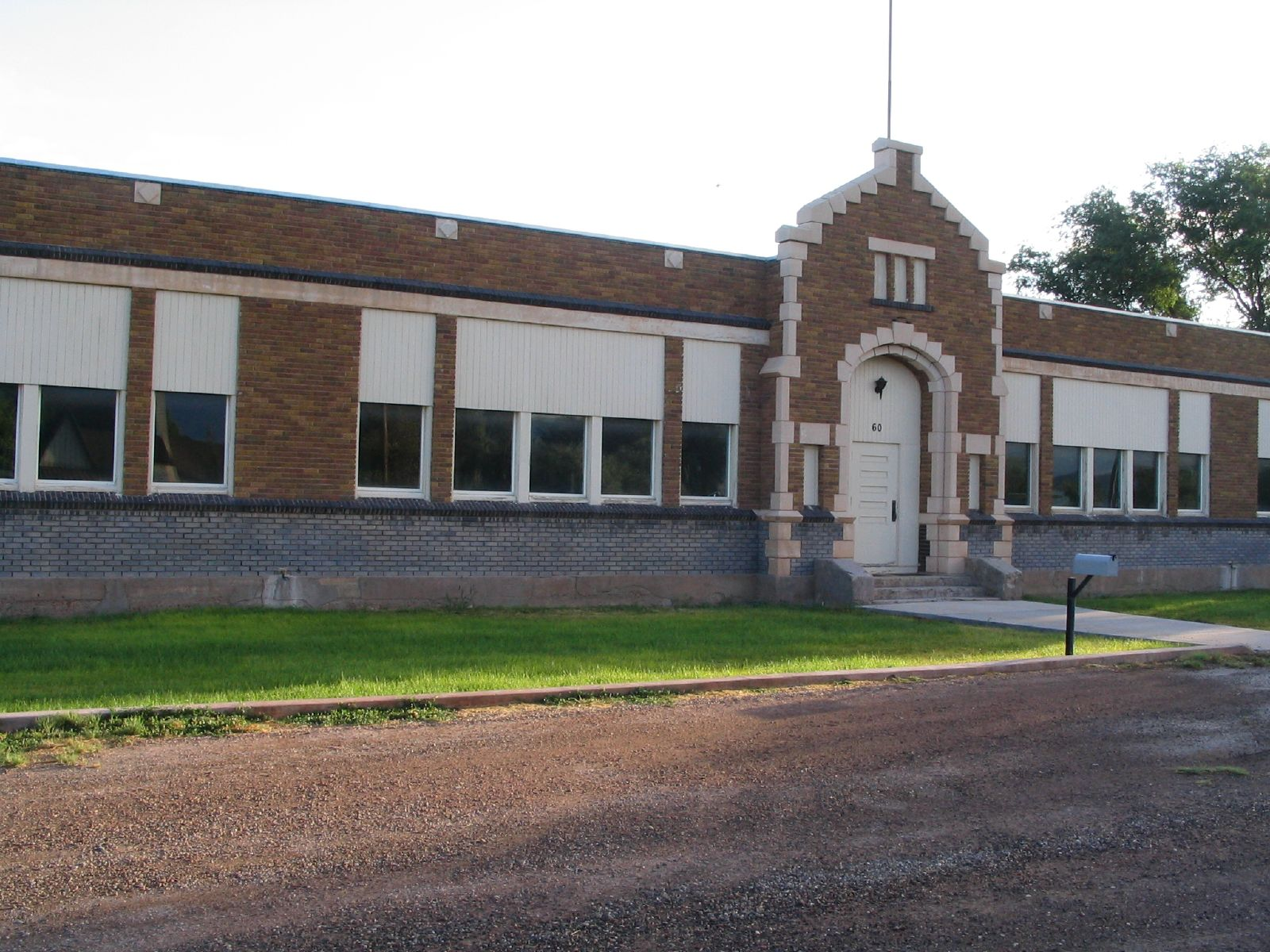
- The old Venice School

- Location within Utah Location within the United States
- Coordinates: 38°48′01″N 112°00′23″W
- Country: United States
- State: Utah
- County: Sevier
- Settled: 1875
- Founder: Francis G. Wall
- Elevation: 5,223 ft (1,592 m)
- Time zone: UTC-7 (Mountain (MST))
  - Summer (DST): UTC-6 (MDT)
- ZIP code: 84701
- Area code: 435
- GNIS feature ID: 1446921

Venice (/ˈvɛnɪs/ VEN-iss) is an unincorporated community in northwestern Sevier County, Utah, United States.

== Description ==
Venice is a small farming village approximately 5 miles (8.0 km) northeast of Richfield, the county seat. It lies just southeast of State Route 118 (formerly U.S. Route 89) and north of State Route 119. The town of Glenwood (of which Venice is an outgrowth) is some 3 miles (4.8 km) to the southeast, and Sigurd is about 4 miles (6.4 km) northeast. The area considered Venice is approximately bisected by the Sevier River, which runs roughly northeast through the community. To the east is a rocky hill on the edge of the Sevier Plateau known as the Black Knoll, marked with a hillside letter V (38°48′10″N 111°58′21″W).

The community was named after Venice, Italy.

== History ==
Historical population
Census	Pop.	Note	%±
1910	231		—
1920	275		19.0%
1930	307		11.6%
1940	301		−2.0%
1950	238		−20.9%
Source: U.S. Census Bureau

The first settler in the Venice area was Francis George Wall, an early resident of Glenwood. In 1875, Wall bought an 80-acre (32 ha) tract of land, then called the Cove River Ranch, on the south side of the Sevier River. He built a cabin and moved his family from Manti. As other settlers moved in, the settlement was named Wallsville.

One of the most important structures in town was the bridge across the Sevier River. The first such bridge was built as early as 1885. A log meetinghouse was built in Wallsville in 1887, and used for both school and church meetings. A post office was established in the local general store in 1894, and in 1900, a ward of the Church of Jesus Christ of Latter-day Saints was organized. Residents voted to rename their community "Venice".

In 1900, a white brick schoolhouse was built. This school operated until 1924, when the school district built a new building in Venice, and the old building was sold to the LDS Church. This building, with numerous additions over the years, served as the ward meetinghouse until it was torn down in 1984. The school was closed in 1950, but still stands as a Venice landmark.

The Marysvale Branch of the Denver and Rio Grande Western Railroad was formerly the most important transportation corridor in the area. It ran through the northwestern corner of Venice, transporting farm products as well as passengers. The railroad line was closed down after the 1983 landslide at Thistle.

== Economy ==
Farming has always been a way of life in Venice. Through the first half of the 20th century, during the heyday of the Utah-Idaho Sugar Company, sugar beets were a major cash crop. Early on, farmers shipped their beets to the sugar factory in nearby Elsinore. That plant closed in 1928, and the beets started going to the plant to the north in Centerfield. Each time a sugar factory was closed, Venice farmers had to send their crop further and further north, at greater shipping expense. Next came the factory in West Jordan, and finally Garland, in the extreme north of Utah. The last little sugar beet farmers in Venice exited the business in 1976.

Raising livestock is still very important to the community. Area farmers raise cattle, sheep, and poultry. In the 1960s, Venice farmers organized an agricultural cooperative called the Venice Feed & Cattle Company to process feed and market crops and livestock.

== Education ==
Students from Venice have always gone to high school in Richfield. Since the 1950 closure of the Venice School, younger students have attended Richfield schools as well.
