= List of hillside letters in Oregon =

This is a list of hillside letters (also known as mountain monograms) in the U.S. state of Oregon. There are at least 39 hillside letters, acronyms, and messages in the state, possibly more; primarily in small towns in the arid eastern half of the state.

Monogram	Town	Description	Location
A	Adrian		43.737°N 117.0934°W
A	Arlington		45.7216°N 120.1988°W
B	Baker		44.779°N 117.8896°W
B	Barview		45.572°N 123.9397°W
B	Bonanza	Bonanza Jr./Sr. High School	42.1851005°N 121.4056637°W
BR	Unity	Burnt River School	44.4567°N 118.2068°W
CHS (uncertain existence)	Condon	Condon High School	45.2374°N 120.1846°W (uncertain location)
C	Crane		43.4222°N 118.5749°W
C	Culver		44.4833°N 121.2234°W
CC	Prineville	Crook County High School	44.2928°N 120.8332°W
D (uncertain existence)	The Dalles	The Dalles High School	45.5957°N 121.1879°W (uncertain location)
D	Dayville		44.4758°N 119.5105°W
D	Dufur		45.458°N 121.1387°W
E	Elgin		45.5686°N 117.9057°W
E	Eugene	Eugene High School (Now South Eugene High School)	44.0578°N 123.09478°W
G	Garibaldi		45.5623°N 123.9201°W
H	Harper		43.8496°N 117.5974°W
H	Klamath Falls	Henley High School	42.21°N 121.697°W
HL	Hot Lake		45.2426°N 117.9597°W
H	Huntington		44.361°N 117.2631°W
I	Imnaha		45.5601°N 116.8377°W (uncertain location)
I	Ione		45.4973°N 119.8273°W
JV	Jordan Valley		42.9788°N 117.0577°W
K	Klamath Falls	Klamath Union High School	42.239°N 121.7695°W
L (no longer exists)	La Grande		45.3206°N 118.111°W
L	Lakeview		42.2008°N 120.3353°W
LR	Merrill	Lost River Jr./Sr. High School	42.025805°N 121.5213427°W
M	Madras		44.6325°N 121.1383°W
M	Mapleton		44.0374°N 123.8525°W
M	Klamath Falls	Mazama High School	42.2256°N 121.7046°W
M (uncertain existence)	Milton-Freewater		45.9398°N 118.3956°W (uncertain location)
M	Mitchell		44.5686°N 120.1528°W
M	Monument		44.8240°N 119.4181°W
MV	Mount Vernon		44.4244°N 119.1184°W
O	Oakridge		43.7506°N 122.4670°W
OT	Klamath Falls	Oregon Institute of Technology	42.2636°N 121.7832°W
P	Paisley		42.6922°N 120.5733°W
P (largely overgrown)	Portland	University of Portland	45.5703°N 122.7257°W
P	Prairie City		44.4656°N 118.7071°W
RR	Rogue River		42.4518°N 123.1571°W
SWC	Maupin	South Wasco County High School	45.1815°N 121.0755°W
O	Eugene	University of Oregon	44.0577°N 123.0927°W
V	Vale		43.9793°N 117.2266°W
W (uncertain existence)	The Dalles	Wahtonka High School	45.6249°N 121.2243°W (uncertain location)
W	Wallowa		45.5775°N 117.5221°W
WARM SPRINGS	Warm Springs		44.7685°N 121.2686°W
