= List of hillside letters in Idaho =

This is a list of hillside letters (also known as mountain monograms) located in the U.S. state of Idaho. There are between 36 and 42 hillside letters, acronyms, and messages across the state.

Monogram	Town	Description	Location
A	Arco		43.6451°N 113.2879°W
B	Boise		43.5987°N 116.1489°W
B	Bruneau		42.8838°N 115.7961°W
B (uncertain existence)	Butte City		43.6095°N 113.2442°W (uncertain location)
B	Arco	Butte County High School	43.6546°N 113.2945°W
C	Cambridge		44.5601°N 116.7064°W
CHALLIS	Challis		44.4958°N 114.2491°W
CV	Kooskia	Clearwater Valley High School	46.1521°N 115.9837°W
D (uncertain existence)	Deary		46.8093°N 116.5562°W (uncertain location)
D	Declo		42.4798°N 113.5775°W
E	Emmett		43.8332°N 116.4822°W
1860 F	Franklin	settled in 1860, the first town in Idaho	42.0279°N 111.824°W
G	Grace		42.5746°N 111.6844°W
H (uncertain existence)	Hagerman		42.8118°N 114.8969°W (uncertain location)
H (uncertain existence)	Hailey		43.5153°N 114.3058°W (uncertain location)
H	Horseshoe Bend		43.9084°N 116.2151°W
I	Pocatello	Idaho State University	42.8603°N 112.4303°W
I	Inkom		42.7998°N 112.2524°W
K	Kamiah		46.2516°N 115.9809°W
K	Kendrick		46.6161°N 116.6397°W
L	Lava Hot Springs		42.6151°N 112.008°W
L	Leadore		44.7157°N 113.3676°W
L	Lewiston		46.461°N 117.004°W
M	Malad City		42.1995°N 112.2279°W
M	Midvale		44.4374°N 116.8074°W
M	Montpelier		42.3198°N 111.2911°W
M	Mullan		47.475°N 115.795°W
MH	Mountain Home		43.130814°N 115.634689°W
MV	Arimo	Marsh Valley High School	42.5973°N 112.153°W
O	Oakley		42.1964°N 113.9157°W
O	Orofino		46.4964°N 116.2634°W
P	Pocatello		42.8662°N 112.5102°W
P (uncertain existence)	Cottonwood	Prairie High School	46.0559°N 116.3495°W (uncertain location)
P	Preston		42.12176°N 111.78682°W
R	Rexburg	Ricks College	43.7901°N 111.9671°W
R	Rockland		42.5967°N 112.8801°W
S	Salmon		45.1586°N 113.8738°W
S (uncertain existence)	Shoshone		42.9354°N 114.4068°W (uncertain location)
S	Soda Springs		42.6695°N 111.6061°W
SMHS	St. Maries		
W	Weiser		44.265°N 116.9591°W
WS	Dayton	West Side High School	42.0918°N 112.014°W
