= Y Mountain =

Mountain in the American state of Utah

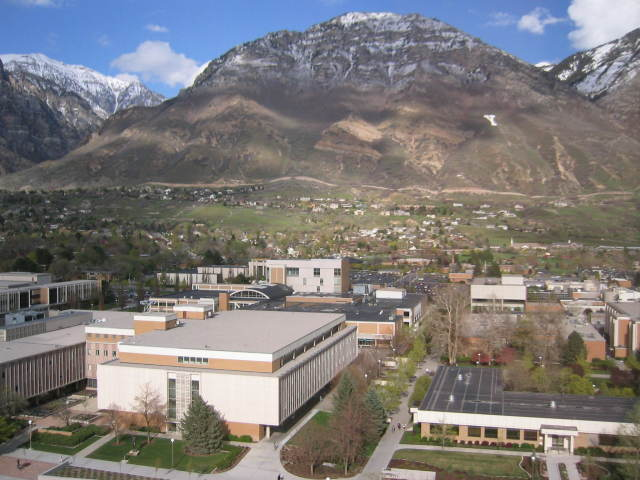

Highest point
- Elevation: 8,572 ft (2,613 m) NAVD 88
- Prominence: 788 ft (240 m)
- Coordinates: 40°15′24″N 111°36′25″W

Geography
- Location within Utah
- Location: Provo, Utah U.S.
- Parent range: Wasatch Front
- Topo map: USGS Bridal Veil Falls

Y Mountain is a mountain located directly east of Brigham Young University (BYU) in Provo, Utah, United States. The Slide Canyon, or Y Mountain Trail, leads to a large block Y located 1.06 miles (1.71 km) from a parking area at the mountain's base with an elevation gain of 1,074 feet (327 m). This hillside letter was built over a hundred years ago as the insignia for BYU. For years the trail to the Y has been one of the most hiked trails in Utah Valley and provides a scenic view of Provo and Orem, the rest of the many cities in Utah Valley and Utah Lake. The trail is also regularly used by hikers, bikers, paragliders and hunters to access the backcountry in the Slide Canyon area.

== Y sign ==
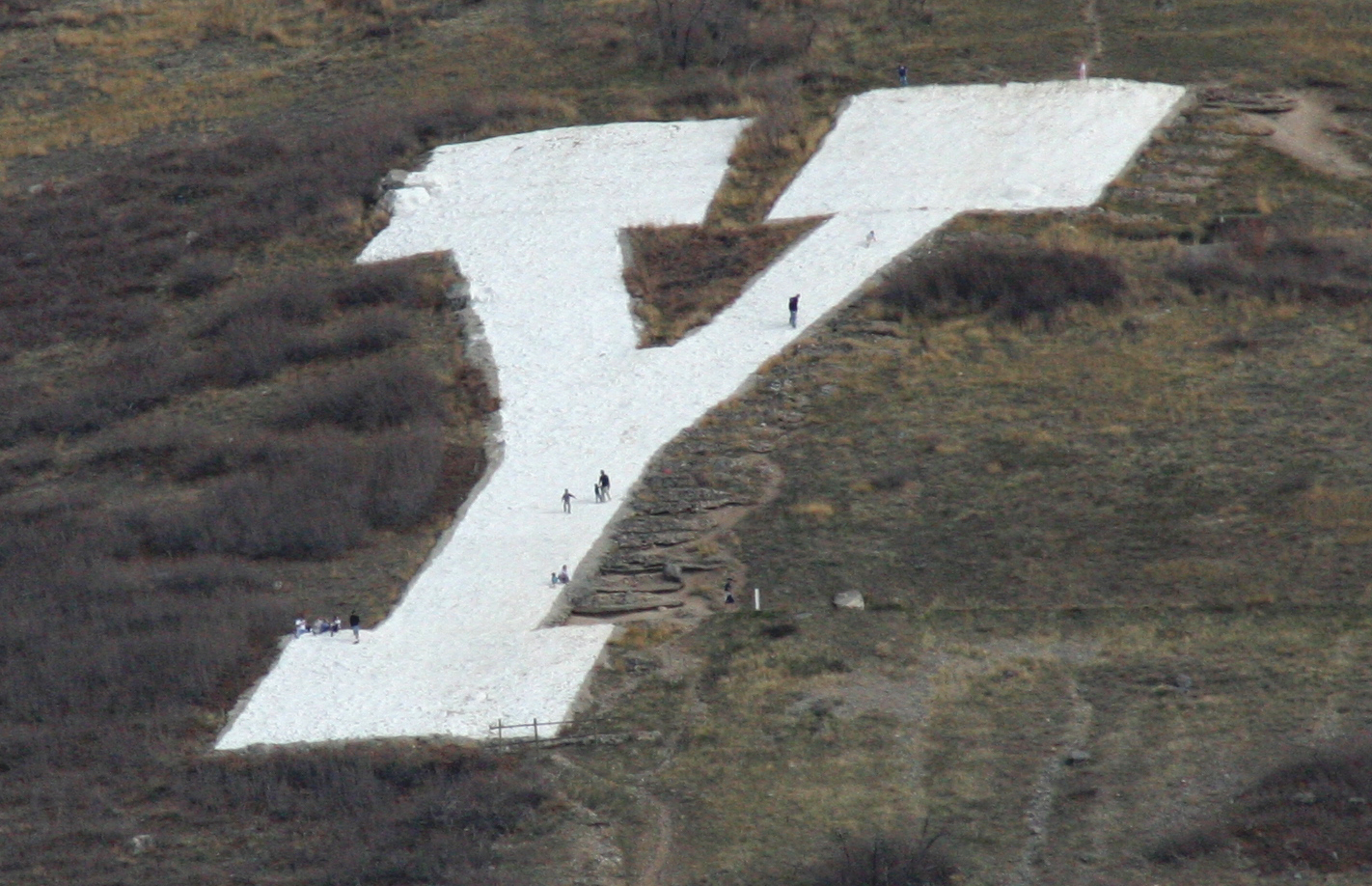
Hikers examining the Y

The large white Y on the side of the mountain has become the nationally recognized insignia for BYU and the reason why BYU is often called "the Y". It was first built in 1906 using rock and lime, and has since been made more permanent with the additions of concrete and paint. At 380 feet long and 130 feet wide (116 by 40 m), the Y is larger than the letters of the Hollywood Sign in Los Angeles.

There used to be 14 strands of lights placed around the perimeter of the Y, which were lit five times a year by the Intercollegiate Knights. When the Y was lit, club members were selected to guard the Y to ensure the generator kept the lights on until nearly midnight. The same volunteer guards assisted the university grounds employees with setting up the lights (and removing them several days later) and remained on duty to protect against vandalism as long as the lights were in place. In 2016, the incandescent lights were replaced with LED lights that can be turned on or off from the campus below. The Y is lit for Freshman Orientation, Homecoming, Y Days, and graduation in April and August.

== History ==
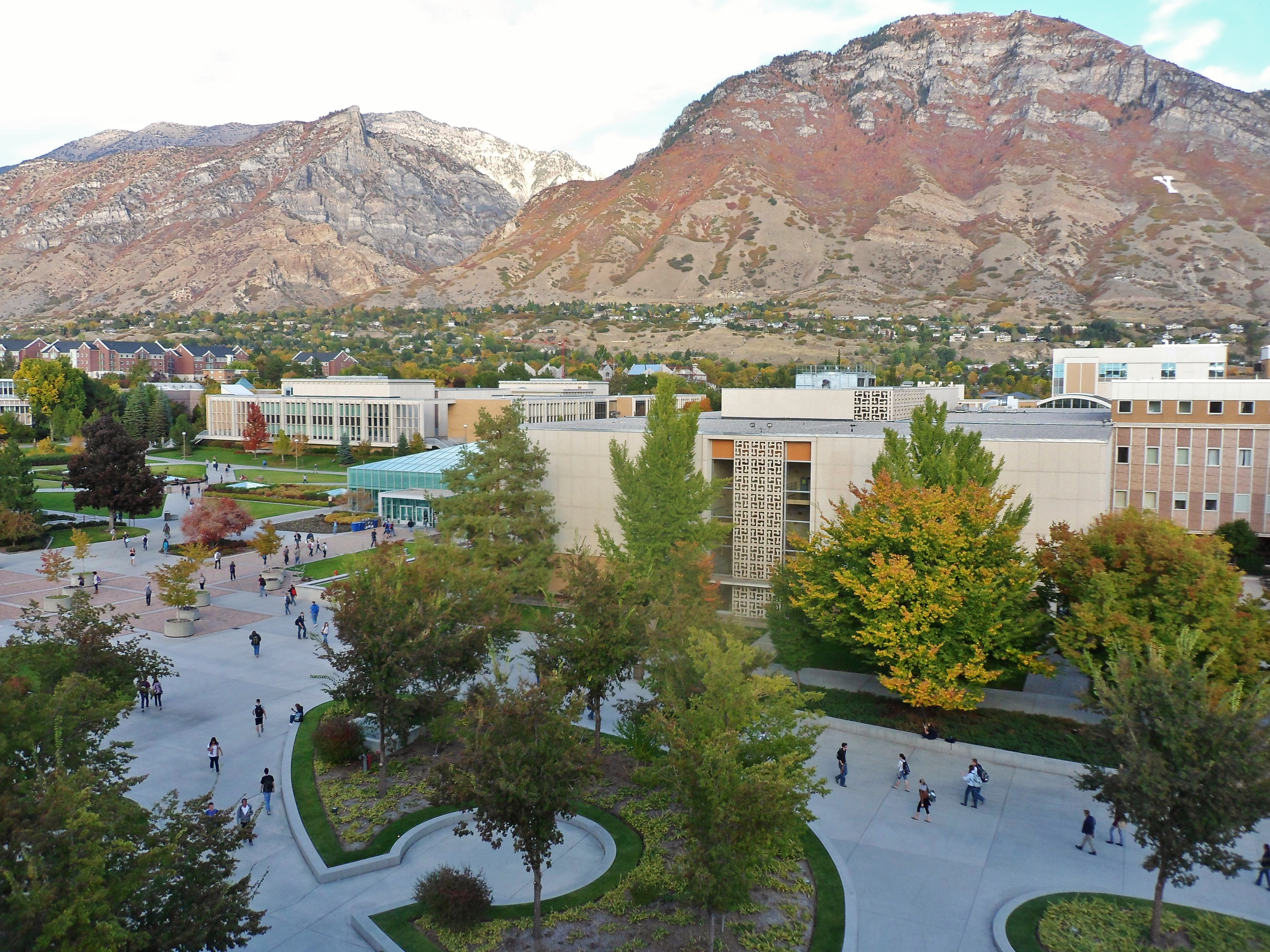
BYU campus with Y Mountain and Kyhv Peak in the background

In early 1906, when the junior class of Brigham Young High School (BYHS) wanted to paint '07 on the side of the mountain, the BYHS senior class became upset. To settle this conflict, BYU President George H. Brimhall and BYHS Principal Edwin S. Hinckley proposed that they paint the letters BYU on the mountain instead. In April, the plans to construct the BYU on the mountain were begun. Professor Ernest D. Partridge was assigned to conduct a survey and designed the emblem. When this was complete, a line of high school and university students, and some faculty, passed buckets of lime, sand, and rocks up the mountain in order to fill up the letters. After six hours of hard labor, only the Y had been completed, so the filling in of the remaining two letters was postponed and later abandoned.

The BYU Y Day tradition began in 1907. This consisted of thousands of students hauling, by bucket brigade, gallons of whitewash up the mountain to paint the giant Y. This tradition lasted until 1973, when it was abandoned due to the mountain eroding.

A 3-foot-high (0.91 m) wall was erected around the letter in 1908 to keep it together. This required an additional 20,000 pounds of concrete. In 1911, serifs were added to the top and bottom of the Y, giving it its current look.

The tradition of "lighting the Y" began in 1924. Each year during special evenings (such as homecoming), mattress batting was placed in buckets and soaked in kerosene. The buckets were then set around the edges of the Y and lit with torches. Eventually, this process evolved into using mattress batting soaked in used vehicle oil which was carried up the mountainside. Once at the Y the mixture was formed into "gook" balls (a little bigger than softballs) with a thumb size hole poked into the top. These were placed around the Y and just before lighting a bit of gasoline was poured into the holes to allow the torches to quickly light the entire Y. Using this method the Y would remain lit for about 20 minutes.

In 1975, BYU began to use a helicopter to carry thousands of pounds of whitewash to repaint the Y. Repainting of the Y is accomplished about every 5 years.

As the previous method of lighting the Y was long considered hazardous (due to the potential wildland fire risk) and because of the brief amount of time the Y would actually remain lit, it was discontinued after the lighting in the spring of 1985. A generator and strands of lights were purchased for exclusive use on the Y, with up to 14 strands of the 25-watt lights bulbs being needed to outline the Y. These lights (first used for homecoming in the fall of 1985) provide several hours of much brighter light and allow the Y to be lit for several consecutive nights in celebration of each event rather than just a short while on a single evening. Initially, the lights and generator were dropped off and picked up by helicopter before and after each event, but after several years an old military ammunition bunker was installed on the mountainside near the Y to securely store the equipment when not in use.

The 100th anniversary of the Y was celebrated on May 20, 2006. Many people hiked the Y that day to commemorate the occasion.

In 2014, the US Congress passed a bill allowing BYU to purchase the 80 acres surrounding the Y from the US Forest Service. The sale required BYU to maintain public access to the trail and the land. In 2016, BYU officials announce the finalization of the purchase of 81 surrounding acres, renovation of erosion damage, installation of permanent lights and trail enhancements.

== Vandalism ==
Like many college symbols, the Y has been the target of various pranks, many of them involving red paint, the principal color of BYU's archrival, the University of Utah. It was most recently painted red by members of the Utah baseball team in 2004. The cost of repair was reported to be over $6,000, and therefore, in accordance with laws of the state of Utah, the perpetrators were initially charged with second degree felonies.

It has also been painted many other times, such as an incident in 2002, when vandals dumped several cans of paint down the Y, giving it a multicolored visage until it was painted white again the next day. This incident was called the worst act of vandalism against the Y in the past decade.

On March 4, 2021, a group of about 40 students unofficially lit the Y in rainbow colors for an hour on Rainbow Day—a year after changes were made to the Honor Code regarding homosexual behavior among students.

== Hiking the Y ==
Hiking to the Y is a popular activity for BYU students and locals going for a walk or jog, or exercising their pets. Most BYU students end up hiking the 'Y' at least once during their time in school, either on a date or for one of the university's "Light the Y" events. The peak is 1.1 miles from the Y Mountain trailhead accessed from eastern Provo via road E 820 N.

== Cave incident ==
In 2005, two women and two men dove into a water-filled cave on the mountain and left behind another man at the cave's entrance. When the four individuals did not return, the lone man called for help which started a search and rescue operation. The rescue crew, who were not aware of the cave's existence, decided to pump the water out of the cave. During this process they had discovered that the four individuals had drowned. As a response to the tragedy, the city sealed the entrance of the cave.

== See also ==
- Block U
- Sentinel Peak (Arizona)
