= Block U =

Hillside letter on Mount Van Cott in Salt Lake City, Utah

Coordinates: 40°46′45.72″N 111°50′23.58″W

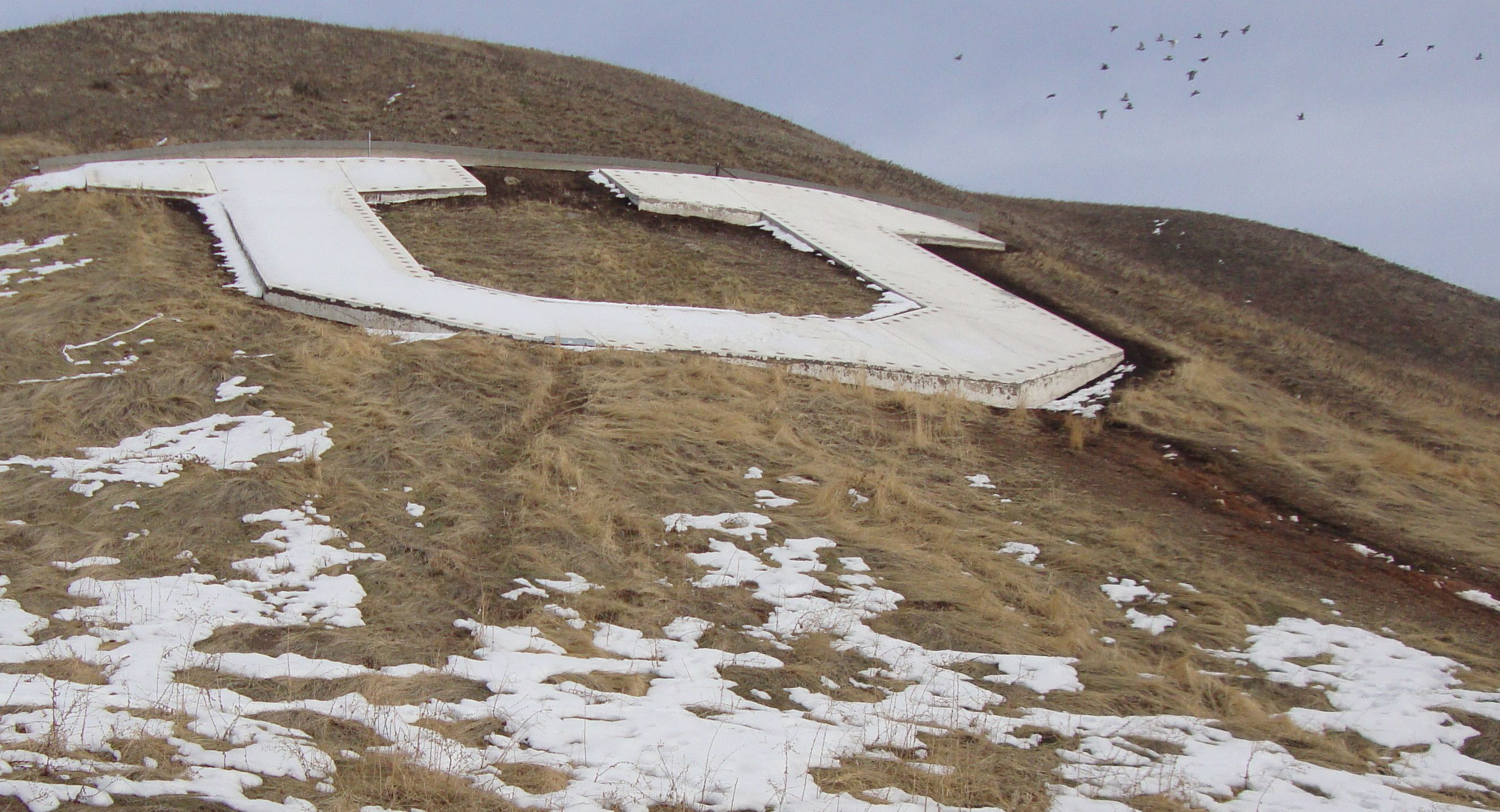
An upward look at the Block U

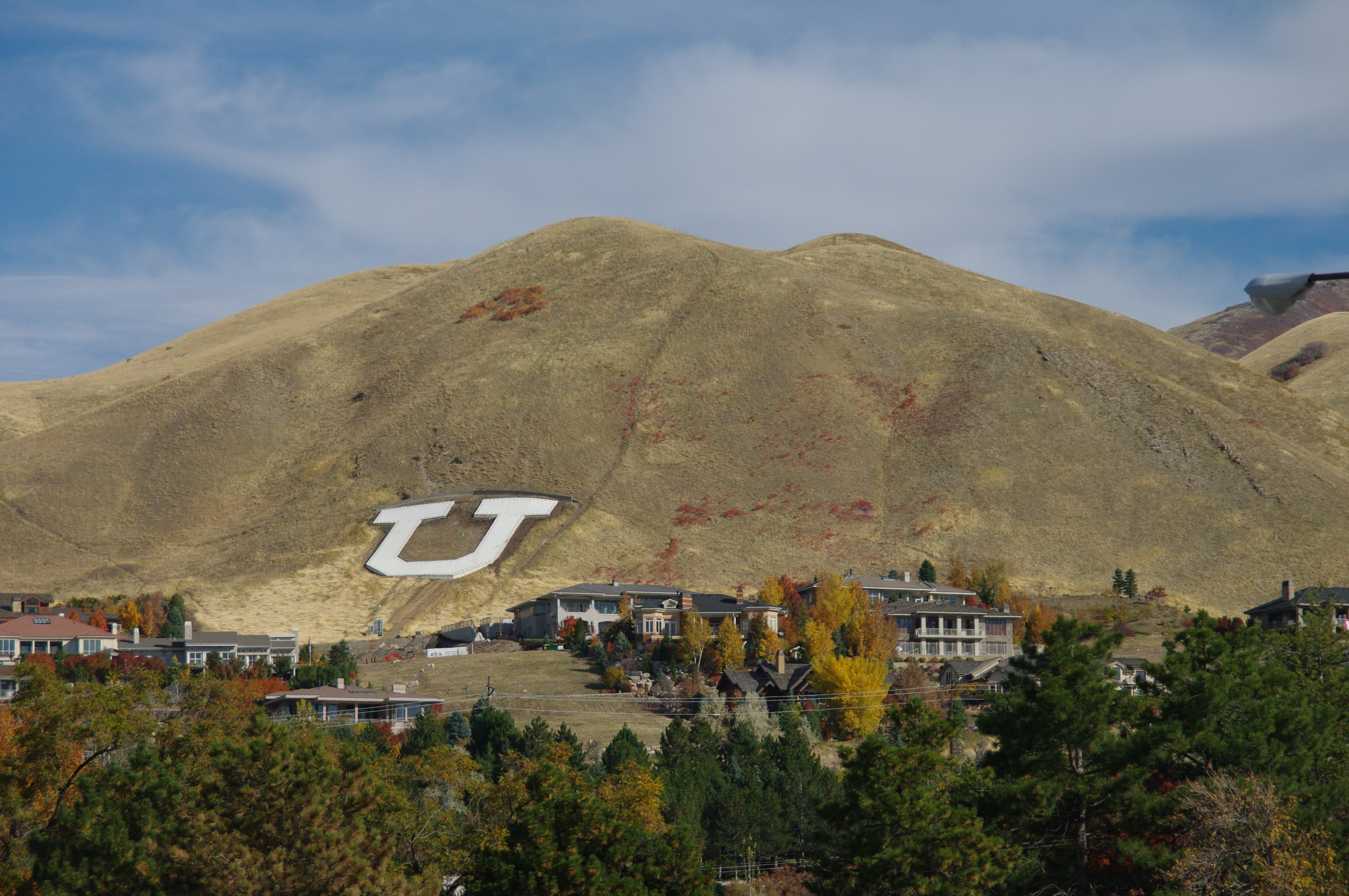
View from below

The Block U is a large concrete hillside letter on Mount Van Cott in Salt Lake City, Utah. The stylized "U" is a logo of the University of Utah and is located just north of the university’s campus. It is one of the earliest hillside letters. It sits at 1,600 metres (5,200 ft) above sea level. Lights outlining the Block U flash when the Utah Utes athletic teams win and burn steady when they are defeated.

The official name is the “Block U” and is a registered trademark of the University of Utah.

== History ==
The history of the Block U begins at the turn of the twentieth century. Each year, as an unofficial activity, students of the University of Utah would climb “The Hill” (Mount Van Cott) and paint their class year on the mountainside. The administration felt that something more permanent was needed. In 1907 the block U was built with limestone. The U is over 30 meters (100 feet) tall and has a surface area of over 455 square meters (5,000 square feet). It can be seen from many different areas of the Salt Lake Valley. It was later modified in 1967 to include 124 lights. By 2001 the Block U had fallen into a constant state of disrepair. Despite several attempted maintenance by students it was not sustainable without a more thorough renovation.

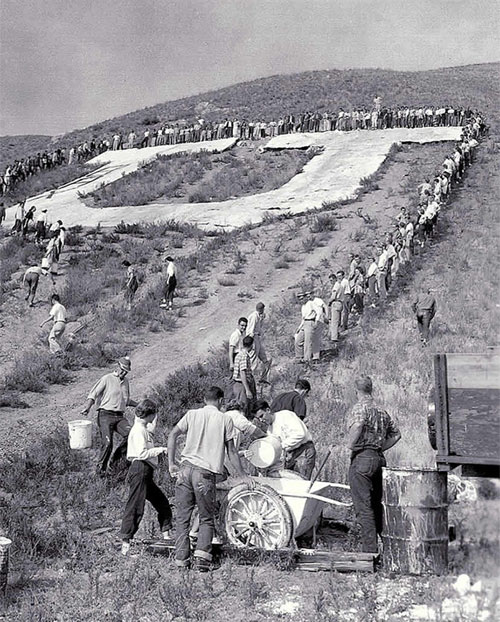
Students repainting the Block U

=== Renovation ===
In 2006, the University of Utah completed a $400,000 restoration project known as "Renew the U". Sue Christensen, a University of Utah alumnus, initiated the restoration project. These improvements include:

- New lights that are now controlled through a Wireless link. The controls are located in the Merrill Engineering building.
- Two hundred and forty flush-mounted light fixtures that will alternate red and white.
- A dimmer feature that allows lights to flash at higher or lower intensities.
- A diversion barrier above the structure and a drainage system to aide runoff and stop erosion.

After the renovation, an official lighting ceremony was held on October 5, 2006 during halftime of the football game between Utah and TCU at Rice-Eccles Stadium.

== Visiting the Block U ==
The Block U has a physical address of 1635 New Bedford Dr, Salt Lake City, Utah 84103. The official trailhead is located at the end of Tomahawk Dr, Salt Lake City, Utah 84103.

== See also ==
- Y Mountain
