= The Big "C" =

Coordinates: 37.8746°N 122.2496°W

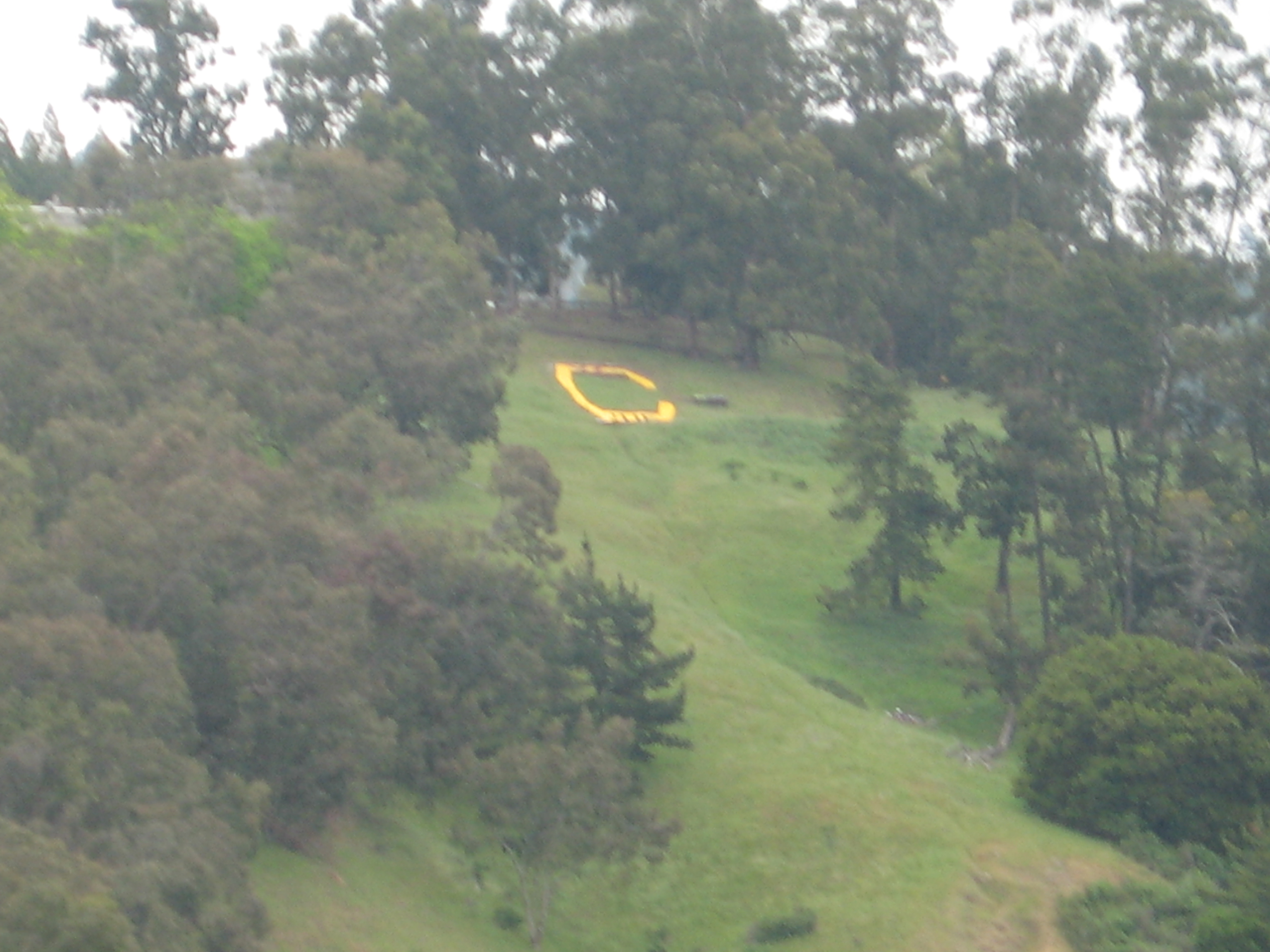
The Big "C" in 2007

The Big "C" is a large concrete letter "C" built into Charter Hill in the Berkeley Hills overlooking the University of California, Berkeley. It was constructed on March 23, 1905, and is considered a campus landmark.

== History ==
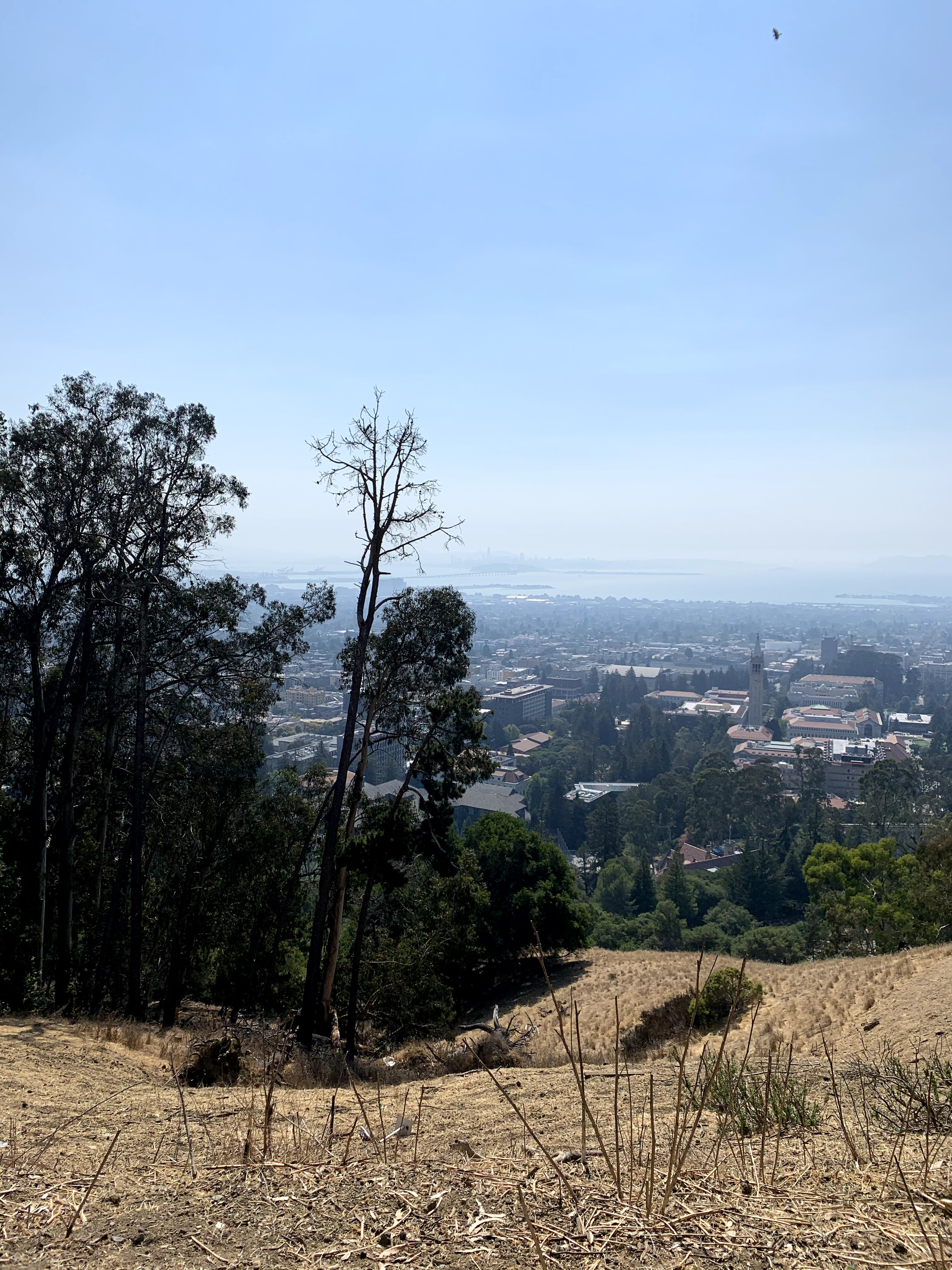
View from The Big "C" towards San Francisco

=== Class rush and construction ===
Soon after the University of California's founding in 1868, a tradition known as class rush was founded. During the event, freshmen would run up the hills above the campus and mark their class numerals in the hillside for all to see, but the sophomore class would attempt to protect the hill by rolling the freshmen back down the hill. The University, however, recognized the tradition as dangerous and banned it. As a result, the men of the freshmen and sophomore classes jointly constructed the Big "C" upon the hills above the Greek Theatre and California Memorial Stadium. A plaque was emplaced with the words "In memory of the Rush, buried Charter Day 1905 by the classes of 1907 and 1908. Requiescat in pace." Once the concrete dried, the freshman class, still trying to preserve the ideals of class rush, painted the Big "C" gold, one of the University's colors.

The construction of the symbol is commemorated in the fight song "Big C".

=== Post-construction history ===
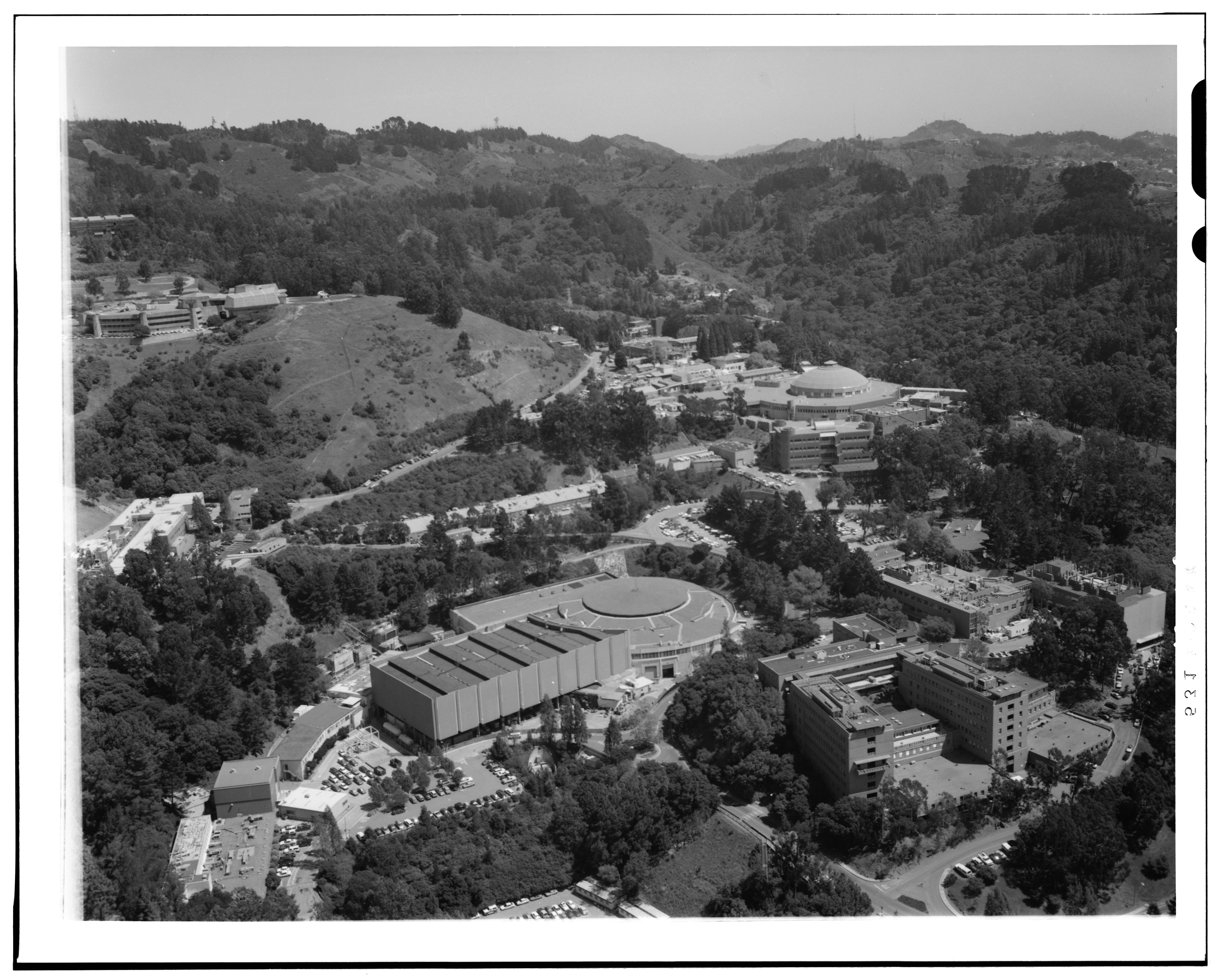
Aerial view of LBNL in 1994 showing the Bevatron (center), Lawrence Hall of Science (upper left), and 184-in cyclotron (upper right); the Big C is to the right of the cyclotron

After construction, the job of keeping the Big "C" painted yellow became the responsibility of the sophomore class as other classes, fraternities, and organizations would paint over the Big "C" in a display of their class or organization pride. The process continued as the Big "C" accumulated inches of paint layers over its original concrete base. In 1961, a group of Stanford University engineering students used jackhammers to assault the Big "C" and rearrange the concrete to a block "S," but the problem was quickly corrected. Soon, the Rally Committee was made guardian of the Big "C" and is currently responsible for its upkeep and protection.

In the 1940s, a 184-inch cyclotron was constructed above the Big "C" at what was to become the Lawrence Berkeley National Laboratory.

== Other Cs ==
Several other University of California Branches (Riverside, most prominently), have since constructed their own "C"s. The "C" located on the Box Spring Mountains at UC Riverside is the largest and topographically the highest "C" in the UC system. The "C" is a hallmark at all UC campuses, but at UCR, the "C" continues to be student-inspired. Students campaigned to have a "C" on the side of the Box Springs Mountains that would be bigger than that of any other campus. Early in the 1954-55 school year, a group of UCR students assembled on the roof of Weber Hall while another group gathered at the selected spot on the Box Springs Mountain to mark off the site. In 2017, the most direct trail to the C was fenced off due to the creation of the Perris Valley rail line. The trail is still accessible from a trailhead to the north, though hikers are discouraged from crossing onto the railroad right-of-way.
