= Mount Zion (Colorado) =

Mountain in Colorado, United States

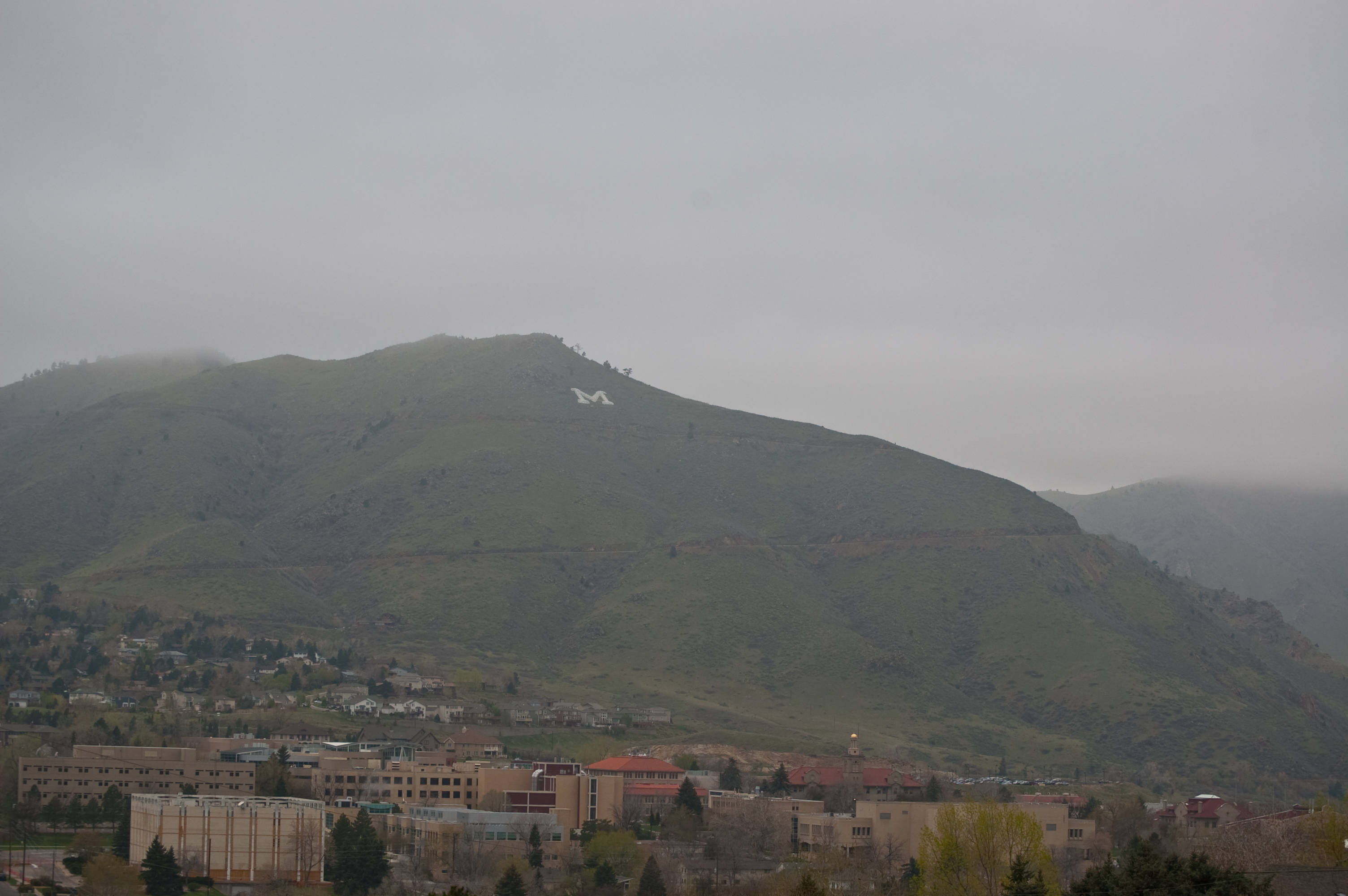
- View of Mount Zion from South Table Mountain in the rain.

Highest point
- Elevation: 7,062 ft (2,152 m)
- Isolation: 0.29 mi (0.47 km)
- Coordinates: 39°44′37″N 105°14′31″W

Geography
- Location within Colorado
- Location: Jefferson County, Colorado, U.S.
- Parent range: Front Range
- Topo map(s): USGS 7.5' topographic map Morrison, Colorado

Climbing
- Easiest route: walk from Lookout Mountain Road (Lariat Loop Road)

Mount Zion is a foothill on the eastern flank of the Front Range of the Rocky Mountains of North America. The 7,062-foot (2,152 m) peak is located in Windy Saddle Park, 1.7 miles (2.7 km) west (bearing 273°) of downtown Golden, Colorado, United States.

== Tradition ==
One notable feature of Mount Zion is a white "M", maintained by the Colorado School of Mines. All freshmen attending the school climb the mountain and each add a rock on the "M" which they can take with them when they graduate. This is a tradition that has been going on since 1908 when the M was first created. The "M" has been permanently lighted since 1932.

== See also ==
- List of Colorado mountain ranges
- List of Colorado mountain summits
  - List of Colorado fourteeners
  - List of Colorado 4000 meter prominent summits
  - List of the most prominent summits of Colorado
- List of Colorado county high points
