= Lists of public art =

== By category ==
- List of Armenian Genocide memorials
- List of association football statues
- List of Australian rules football statues
- List of equestrian statues
- List of hillside letters
- List of Love sculptures
- List of monuments and memorials to Pope John Paul II
- List of statues of Karl Marx
- List of statues of Vladimir Lenin
- List of statues of Jesus
- List of statues of Queen Victoria
- List of Muffler Men
- List of statues
- Lists of monuments and memorials
- List of Whaling Walls
- Trail of the Whispering Giants

== By country ==
=== Armenia ===
- List of statues in Yerevan

=== Australia ===
- Australia's big things
- New South Wales
  - List of public art in the City of Sydney
- Queensland
  - List of public art in Brisbane
  - List of public art in South Australia
  - List of public art in Western Australia

=== Brazil ===
- List of public art in São Paulo

=== Canada ===
- List of public art in Halifax, Nova Scotia
- List of public art in Montreal
- O-Train public art
- Toronto subway public art
- List of public art in Victoria, British Columbia
- Public art in Vancouver

=== Cameroon ===
- List of public art in Cameroon
- List of public art in Douala

=== China ===
- List of public art in Shanghai

=== Czech Republic ===
- List of public art in Prague
- List of statues on Charles Bridge

=== Denmark ===
- List of public art in Aarhus
- List of public art in Copenhagen
  - List of public art in Rosenborg Castle Gardens
  - List of public art in Ørstedsparken
  - List of public art in Copenhagen Botanical Garden
  - List of public art in Copenhagen
- List of public art in Roskilde Municipality

=== Germany ===
- List of public art in Berlin
- List of public art in Hannover
- List of public art in Sylt

=== France ===
- List of public art in Corse-du-Sud
- List of public art in Haute-Corse

=== India ===
- List of the tallest statues in India

=== Ireland ===
- List of public art in Cork city
- List of public art in County Donegal
- List of public art in Dublin
- List of public art in Galway city
- List of public art in Letterkenny
- List of public art in Limerick

=== Israel ===
- List of public art in Israel

=== Italy ===
- List of obelisks in Rome
- List of public art in Milan
- List of public art in Rome
- List of public art in Venice

=== Japan ===
- List of public art in Tokyo
- List of National Treasures of Japan (sculptures)

=== Lithuania ===
- List of public art in Vilnius

=== Mexico ===
- List of public art in Mexico City
- List of public art in Puebla (city)

=== Monaco ===
- List of public art in Monaco

=== Qatar ===
- Public art in Qatar

=== Romania ===
- List of sculptures in Herăstrău Park

=== Sweden ===
- List of public art in Varberg

=== Turkey ===
- List of public art in Istanbul

=== United Kingdom ===
- England
  - List of public art in Bristol
  - List of public art in Buckinghamshire
  - List of public art in Cambridgeshire
  - List of public art in Dorset
  - List of public art in Greater Manchester
  - List of public art in Hampshire
  - List of public art in Herefordshire
  - List of public art in London
    - List of public art in the City of London
      - List of public art on the Victoria Embankment
    - List of public art in the City of Westminster
      - List of public art in Belgravia
      - List of public art in Covent Garden
      - List of public art in Green Park
      - List of public art in Hyde Park, London
      - List of public art in Kensington
      - List of public art in Kensington Gardens
      - List of public art in Knightsbridge
      - List of public art in Mayfair
      - List of public art in Millbank
      - List of public art in Paddington
      - List of public art in Pimlico
      - List of public art in St James's
      - List of public art in St Marylebone
      - List of public art in Soho
      - List of public art in Strand, London
      - List of public art in Trafalgar Square and the vicinity
      - List of public art in Victoria, London
      - List of public art in Westminster
      - List of public art in Whitehall
      - List of public art on the Victoria Embankment
    - List of public art in the London Borough of Barking and Dagenham
    - List of public art in the London Borough of Barnet
    - List of public art in the London Borough of Bexley
    - List of public art in the London Borough of Brent
    - List of public art in the London Borough of Bromley
    - List of public art in the London Borough of Camden
      - List of public art in Covent Garden
    - List of public art in the London Borough of Croydon
    - List of public art in the London Borough of Ealing
    - List of public art in the London Borough of Enfield
    - List of public art in the London Borough of Hackney
    - List of public art in the London Borough of Haringey
    - List of public art in the London Borough of Hammersmith and Fulham
    - List of public art in the London Borough of Harrow
    - List of public art in the London Borough of Havering
    - List of public art in the London Borough of Hillingdon
    - List of public art in the London Borough of Hounslow
    - List of public art in the London Borough of Islington
    - List of public art in the London Borough of Lambeth
    - List of public art in the London Borough of Lewisham
    - List of public art in the London Borough of Merton
    - List of public art in the London Borough of Newham
    - List of public art in the London Borough of Redbridge
    - List of public art in the London Borough of Richmond upon Thames
    - List of public art in the London Borough of Southwark
    - List of public art in the London Borough of Sutton
    - List of public art in the London Borough of Tower Hamlets
    - List of public art in the London Borough of Waltham Forest
    - List of public art in the London Borough of Wandsworth
    - List of public art in the Royal Borough of Greenwich
    - List of public art in the Royal Borough of Kensington and Chelsea
      - List of public art in Belgravia
      - List of public art in Kensington
      - List of public art in Kensington Gardens
      - List of public art in Knightsbridge
    - List of public art in the Royal Borough of Kingston upon Thames
  - List of public art in Norfolk
  - North Yorkshire
    - List of public art in Harrogate
  - List of public art in Newcastle upon Tyne
  - Nottinghamshire
    - List of public art in Nottingham
  - List of public art in Oxfordshire
  - Statuary of the West Front of Salisbury Cathedral
  - List of public art in Shropshire
  - List of public art in Somerset
  - List of public art in Staffordshire
  - List of public art in Surrey
  - List of public art in Warwickshire
  - West Midlands
    - List of public art in Birmingham
    - List of public art in Coventry
    - List of public art in Dudley
    - List of public art in Sandwell
    - List of public art in Solihull
    - List of public art in Walsall
    - List of public art in Wolverhampton
  - Wiltshire
    - List of public art in Wiltshire
    - Statuary of the West Front of Salisbury Cathedral
  - List of public art in Worcestershire
- Scotland
  - List of public art in Aberdeen
  - List of public art in Angus
  - List of public art in Dumfries and Galloway
  - List of public art in Dundee
  - List of public art in East Ayrshire
  - List of public art in Edinburgh
  - List of public art in Falkirk
  - List of public art in Glasgow
  - List of public art in North Ayrshire
  - List of public art in Perth and Kinross
  - List of public art in the Scottish Borders
  - List of public art in South Ayrshire
  - List of public art in Stirling
  - Scottish war memorials
- Wales
  - List of public art on Anglesey
  - List of public art in Blaenau Gwent
  - List of public art in Cardiff
  - List of public art in Carmarthenshire
  - List of public art in Ceredigion
  - List of public art in Conwy
  - List of public art in Denbighshire
  - List of public art in Flintshire
  - List of public art in Gwynedd
  - List of public art in Monmouthshire
  - List of public art in Newport, Wales
  - List of public art in Pembrokeshire
  - List of public art in Powys
  - List of public art in Swansea
  - List of public art in the Vale of Glamorgan
  - List of public art in Wrexham County Borough

=== United States ===
==== Across the United States ====
- List of Holocaust memorials and museums in the United States
- Confederate monuments and memorials
- List of memorials to the Grand Army of the Republic
- List of Union Civil War monuments and memorials
- List of the tallest statues in the United States

==== By state ====
- Alabama
  - List of Confederate monuments and memorials in Alabama
- Arizona
  - List of hillside letters in Arizona
- California
  - List of hillside letters in California
  - List of public art in Los Angeles
  - List of public art in Palm Desert, California
  - List of public art in San Diego
  - List of public art in San Francisco
  - List of public art in Santa Monica, California
- Colorado
  - List of public art in Denver
- Florida
  - List of public art in Tampa, Florida
- Georgia
  - List of Confederate monuments and memorials in Georgia
- Idaho
  - List of hillside letters in Idaho
- Illinois
  - List of public art in Chicago
- Indiana
  - List of public art in Indiana
    - List of public art in Bartholomew County, Indiana
    - List of public art in Boone County, Indiana
    - List of public art in Cass County, Indiana
    - List of public art in Dubois County, Indiana
    - List of public art in Elkhart County, Indiana
    - List of public art in Evansville, Indiana
    - List of public art in Fort Wayne, Indiana
    - List of public art in Indianapolis
      - List of public art in Crown Hill Cemetery
      - List of public art at Indiana University – Purdue University Indianapolis
      - List of public art at the Indiana Statehouse
      - List of outdoor artworks at Newfields
    - List of public art in Jasper, Indiana
    - List of public art in Lake County, Indiana
    - List of public art in LaPorte County, Indiana
    - List of public art in Madison County, Indiana
    - List of public art in New Harmony, Indiana
    - List of outdoor artworks at Newfields
    - List of public art in Spencer County, Indiana
    - List of public art in St. Joseph County, Indiana
    - List of public art in Terre Haute, Indiana
    - List of public art in Tippecanoe County, Indiana
    - List of public art in Vigo County, Indiana
- Kansas
  - List of fountains in the Kansas City metropolitan area
- Maryland
  - List of public art in Baltimore
- Massachusetts
  - Arts on the Line
  - List of public art in Boston
  - List of public art in Cambridge, Massachusetts
- Michigan
  - List of public art in Detroit
- Mississippi
  - List of Confederate monuments and memorials in Mississippi
- Missouri
  - List of fountains in the Kansas City metropolitan area
- Montana
  - List of hillside letters in Montana
- Nebraska
  - List of public art in Omaha, Nebraska
- Nevada
  - List of hillside letters in Nevada
- New York
  - List of public art in New York City
  - List of public art in Brooklyn
  - List of public art in Manhattan
  - List of public art in Queens
  - List of sculptures in Central Park
- North Carolina
  - List of Confederate monuments and memorials in North Carolina
  - List of public art in Charlotte, North Carolina
- Ohio
  - List of public art in Columbus, Ohio
- Oklahoma
  - List of public art in Oklahoma City
- Oregon
  - List of hillside letters in Oregon
  - List of public art in Ashland, Oregon
  - List of public art in Beaverton, Oregon
  - List of public art in Bend, Oregon
  - List of public art in Eugene, Oregon
  - List of public art in Gresham, Oregon
  - List of public art in Hillsboro, Oregon
  - List of public art in Lake Oswego, Oregon
  - List of public art in Portland, Oregon
  - List of public art in Salem, Oregon
- Pennsylvania
  - List of monuments of the Gettysburg Battlefield
  - List of public art in Philadelphia
- South Carolina
  - List of Confederate monuments and memorials in South Carolina
- Texas
  - List of Texas Revolution monuments and memorials
  - List of public art in Austin, Texas
  - List of public art in Houston
- Utah
  - List of hillside letters in Utah
- Virginia
  - List of Confederate monuments and memorials in Virginia
  - List of memorials and monuments at Arlington National Cemetery
- Washington
  - List of public art in Kirkland, Washington
  - List of public art in Olympia, Washington
  - List of public art in Seattle
  - List of public art in Vancouver, Washington
- List of public art in Washington, D.C.
  - List of public art in Washington, D.C., Ward 1
  - List of public art in Washington, D.C., Ward 2
  - List of public art in Washington, D.C., Ward 3
  - List of public art in Washington, D.C., Ward 4
  - List of public art in Washington, D.C., Ward 5
  - List of public art in Washington, D.C., Ward 6
  - List of public art in Washington, D.C., Ward 7
  - List of public art in Washington, D.C., Ward 8
  - Outdoor sculpture in Washington, D.C.
- Wisconsin
  - List of public art in Madison, Wisconsin
  - List of public art in Milwaukee

== Public art listed by artist ==
- List of public works by David Black
- List of Alexander Calder public works
- List of Louise Nevelson public art works
- List of public art by Oldenburg and van Bruggen
- List of Tony Smith public works
- List of James Turrell artworks
