= List of public art in Oxfordshire =

This is a list of public art in Oxfordshire, in England. This list applies only to works of public art accessible in an outdoor public space. For example, this does not include artwork visible inside a museum.

== Oxford ==
Image	Title / subject	Location and coordinates	Date	Artist / designer	Type	Material	Dimensions	Designation	Owner / administrator	Notes
	The Oxford Ox	Park End Street. OX1 1HS 51.753512°N 1.269079°W	2001	Olivia Musgrave	Sculpture	Bronze	>3m tall.		unknown	Commissioned to celebrate the opening of the Saïd Business School.
	Inspire	Oxford Castle. OX1 1AY 51.751442°N 1.262796°W	2006	Alan Wilson	Sculpture	Bronze and stainless steel	4m tall.		unknown	Commissioned by the Trevor Osborne Partnership, this sculpture references ancient obelisks and their relationship with the arc of the sun. The overall shape reflects the huge ancient window on one side of the square while the mix of bronze and stainless steel pays homage to the ancient and modern buildings that make up the space.
	View through the Window	Elizabeth Jennings Way. OX2 7BW 51.773577°N 1.269548°W	2007	Tim Shutter		Bath stone, Stoke Ground base bed	244 x 357 x 155 cm		Berkeley Homes, Oxford and Chiltern Ltd.	The form of the bay window doubles as a temple-like folly. The mullions represent car parts in reference to the Morris Oxford factory that used to be on this site.
More images	"Another Time XI", known locally as "The Iron Man"	on the roof of Blackwell’s Art and Poster shop at the corner of Broad Street and Turl Street, Oxford. 51.754195°N 1.256496°W	2009	Anthony Gormley	Statue	Iron	2.1m tall		Exeter College, Oxford	The statue was placed on the roof of Blackwell’s Art and Poster shop at 9.30am on Sunday 15 February 2009. It weighs half a tonne, and is part of Gormley's "Another Time II" series of figures. An anonymous benefactor provided the funds for Exeter College to secure the sculpture.
More images	"Knowledge and Understanding", known locally as "Books"	Bonn Square, Oxford. OX1 1LQ 51.751728°N 1.260055°W	2009	Diana Bell	Sculpture	Bronze	1m tall		Oxford City Council	A gift to Oxford in 2009 to commemorate 60 years of twinning with the German city, 'Books' is inscribed with the words Knowledge, Understanding, Friendship and Trust (Wissen, Verständigung, Freundschaft, Vertrauen). The book theme continues on selected benches in the square.
	The Space of Reading	Weston Library, Broad Street, OX1 3BG 51.75485°N 1.25493°W	2019	Tania Kovats	Sculpture				Bodleian Libraries	sculpture created from casts of 21 books
More images	The Great Debate	Oxford University Museum of Natural History, Parks Road, OX1 3PW 51.75870°N 1.25620°W	2010	Alec Peever	Plinth	Limestone	H 121 x W 42.5 x D 43 cm; Plinth: H (?) x W 105 x D (?) cm		Oxford University Museum of Natural History	Lists the names present in 1860: Thomas Henry Huxley, Samuel Wilberforce and others Charles Darwin's Origin of Species in the Museum. 1860-2010.

== Abingdon ==
Image	Title / subject	Location and coordinates	Date	Artist / designer	Type	Material	Dimensions	Designation	Owner / administrator	Notes
More images	Queen Victoria	Abbey Gardens, Abingdon 51.67092°N 1.27840°W	1887		Statue on pedestal	Bronze and stone		Grade II	Vale of White Horse District Council	It was presented to the town of Abingdon by Edwin James Trendell in commemoration of Queen Victoria's Golden Jubilee year in 1887.
	Corn Exchange sculpture	Wall above Pablo Lounge, Market Place, Abingdon 51.67040°N 1.28192°W	1966		Sculpture				Vale of White Horse District Council	Was the site of the Corn Exchange in Abingdon. The sculpture is near the entrance to the Bury Street precinct.
	Octagons	The Old Gaol facing the River Thames, Abingdon 51.66878°N 1.28049°W	December 13, 2021	Tim Ward	Sculpture	Steel	2800 mm tall		Vale of White Horse District Council	Three interlocking octagons relating to the distinctive octagon construction of the Old Gaol. The Abingdon Gaol was built between 1805 and 1818. It was used as a gaol for only 57 years. Auctioned in 1874, it was converted into a corn store, until 1971. It was then used as a sports centre from 1976 to 2002. Converted into apartments from 2021.

== Bicester ==
Image	Title / subject	Location and coordinates	Date	Artist / designer	Type	Material	Dimensions	Designation	Owner / administrator	Notes
More images	Turning	Bicester Arc, Oxford Road, Bicester 51.89165°N 1.16271°W	March 30, 2016	Charlotte Mayer	Sculpture	Bronze	H 300 x W (?) x D (?) cm		Cherwell District Council	An abstract sculpture of undulating wing like bronze ribs. It changes shape when viewed from different directions suggesting the twists and turns of a journey through life. The work was cast and fabricated at Pangolin Editions and Pangolin London.

== Faringdon ==
Image	Title / subject	Location and coordinates	Date	Artist / designer	Type	Material	Dimensions	Designation	Owner / administrator	Notes
	Dali's Diver	Market Place, Church Street 51.658531°N 1.583487°W	2014	Tim Shutter		Bath stone, Stoke Ground base bed	Diver 100 x 52 x 51 cm		Faringdon Town Council	Celebrating the friendship between the local eccentric Lord Berners and Salvador Dali. Includes a carved Berners quotation"Mistrust a man who never has an occasional flash of silliness".

== Wantage ==
Image	Title / subject	Location and coordinates	Date	Artist / designer	Type	Material	Dimensions	Designation	Owner / administrator	Notes
	King Alfred	Market Square, Wantage	1877	Prince Victor of Hohenlohe-Langenburg		Sicilian Marble on a granite block.			Wantage Town Council	
	John Betjeman	Church Street, Wantage	2016	Martin Jennings		Bronze Bust			Wantage Town Council	

== Witney ==
Image	Title / subject	Location and coordinates	Date	Artist / designer	Type	Material	Dimensions	Designation	Owner / administrator	Notes
	Buttercross Needle	Marriotts Walk, Witney 51.78793°N 1.48672°W	2019	Michael Fairfax	Obelisk	stainless steel, glass & fibre optic lights			West Oxfordshire District Council	A contemporary narrow pyramidal obelisk on a geometric steel base. At night, fibre optic lights illuminate it through thin glass strips. It reflects the spire of nearby St Mary's Church and the roof of the Buttercross.
