= List of public art in the Vale of Glamorgan =

Map of Wales with the Vale of Glamorgan highlighted

This is a list of public art in the Vale of Glamorgan. The Vale of Glamorgan is a county borough in south-east Wales. It is the southernmost unitary authority in Wales and is bordered by Bridgend, Cardiff, and Rhondda Cynon Taf. This list applies only to works of public art on permanent display in an outdoor public space and does not, for example, include artworks in museums.

== Barry ==
Image	Title / subject	Location and coordinates	Date	Artist / designer	Type	Material	Dimensions	Designation	Wikidata	Notes
More images	David Davies	Barry Docks Board Offices, Barry		Alfred Gilbert	Statue on pedestal	Bronze and granite	2.7m high	Grade II*	Q17744145	
	Gorsedd stones	Romilly Park, Barry	1920		Stone circle	Stone				Erected to mark the 1920 National Eisteddfod of Wales
	St Helen's Presbytery RC War memorial	Court Road and Wyndham Street, Barry	c. 1920s		Calvary	Marble				
	Barry Railway war memorial	Barry Dock Offices	1922		Plaque with surround	Bronze and stone		Grade II*	Q4864175	
	War memorial	Grounds of Barry Memorial Hall	1932	E. R. Hinschliff	Cenotaph	Stone				
	Merchant Navy memorial	Council Office grounds, Holton Road, Barry	1996		Pillar with globe	Stone				

== Cowbridge ==
Image	Title / subject	Location and coordinates	Date	Artist / designer	Type	Material	Dimensions	Designation	Wikidata	Notes
More images	War memorial	Cowbridge Town Hall, Cowbridge	1921		Statue on plinth	Limestone		Grade II*	Q17744183	

== Dinas Powys ==
Image	Title / subject	Location and coordinates	Date	Artist / designer	Type	Material	Dimensions	Designation	Wikidata	Notes
	War memorial	The Square, Dinas Powys	1935		Column with plaques	Rock-faced stone and bronze		Grade II	Q29503386	

== Llangan ==
Image	Title / subject	Location and coordinates	Date	Artist / designer	Type	Material	Dimensions	Designation	Wikidata	Notes
	Circular cross head	St Canna's Church, Llangan	9th – 10th centuries		Circular cross head	Stone	1.3m high	Scheduled monument		
	Churchyard cross	St Canna's Church, Llangan	15th century		Cross with polygonal shaft	Limestone		Grade I	Q17743891	

== Llantwit Major ==
Image	Title / subject	Location and coordinates	Date	Artist / designer	Type	Material	Dimensions	Designation	Wikidata	Notes
	War memorial	Wine Street, Llantwit Major	1921	E. Thomas	Celtic cross	Stone	3.6m high	Grade II	Q29491376	
	Royal Air Force memorial	Llantwit Major Cemetery			Cross	Stone				

== Penarth ==
Image	Title / subject	Location and coordinates	Date	Artist / designer	Type	Material	Dimensions	Designation	Wikidata	Notes
More images	War memorial	Alexandra Gardens, Penarth	1924	Goscombe John	Cenotaph mounted statue	Granite and bronze		Grade II	Q29491428	
More images	Skytown Gateway	Dingle Park, Windsor Road, Penarth	2020	Ruth Spiller and Cod Steaks	Sculpture	Steel	approx. 4m high			

== Porthkerry ==
Image	Title / subject	Location and coordinates	Date	Artist / designer	Type	Material	Dimensions	Designation	Wikidata	Notes
	Churchyard cross	Churchyard of St Curig's Church, Porthkerry	15th century		Hexagonal cross	Stone		Grade II	Q29505728	

== St Athan ==
Image	Title / subject	Location and coordinates	Date	Artist / designer	Type	Material	Dimensions	Designation	Wikidata	Notes
	War memorial	St Athan	c. 1920		Pillar with orb	Portland stone		Grade II	Q29505708	

== Wenvoe ==
Image	Title / subject	Location and coordinates	Date	Artist / designer	Type	Material	Dimensions	Designation	Wikidata	Notes
	War memorial	Village Green, Wenvoe			Monolith	Stone				
