= List of public art in Cameroon =

This is a list of public art in Cameroon. This list applies only to works of public art accessible in an outdoor public space. For example, this does not include artwork visible inside a museum.

Image	Title / subject	Location and coordinates	Date	Artist / designer	Type	Material	Dimensions	Designation	Owner / administrator	Notes
	La Nouvelle Liberté (The new liberty)	Deïdo in Douala, Cameroon 4.064222°N 9.706936°E	1996	Joseph-Francis Sumégné		Sculpture made with recycled materials	12 meters high, 5 m diameters, 8 tons.		Municipality of Douala	
	La Borne Fontaine	Vallée Bessengue in Douala, Cameroon 4.054601°N 9.707102°E	2003	Danièle Diwouta-Kotto		a permanent fountain	6 meters high, 3 meters width, 4 meters long.		Municipality of Douala	
	La Passerelle de Bessengué	Vallée Bessengue in Douala, Cameroon 4.05532°N 9.707129°E	2005	Alioum Moussa		a painted wooden bridge with an iron handrail	1,26 meters high, 4,92 meters width, 9 meters long.			
	Sud Obelisk	Bonanjo in Douala, Cameroon 4.0382°N 9.7148°E	2007	Faouzi Laatiris		an engraved obelisk	8,75 meters high, 1 meter width, 1 meters long.			
	Njé Mo Yé	New Bell in Douala, Cameroon 4.0329°N 9.748°E	2005	Koko Komégné		a sculpture that represents and glorifies the couple	5 meters high, 2,5 meter width			
	Arbre à palabres	Jardin du tombeau des Rois Bell in Bonanjo, Douala, Cameroon 4.043768°N 9.687152°E	2007	Frédéric Keiff		tree, whose trunk and branches are made of painted iron rods, and leaves made of fragments of colored glass	5 meters high, 10 meter circumference		Municipality of Douala	
	Face à l’eau	Bonamouti-Deido in Douala, Cameroon 4.0672°N 9.7378°E	2008-2010	Salifou Lindou		a sculpture near the Wouri River, made of wood, metal, and colored plastic sheets	3,70 meters high			
	Les Mots écrits de New Bell	New Bell Ngangué in Douala, Cameroon 4.0204°N 9.738°E	2008-2010	Hervé Yamguen		a set of six mural installations			Municipality of Douala	
	Le Jardin sonore	Bonamouti-Deido, near Wouri River. in Douala, Cameroon 4.0943°N 9.8151°E	2010	Lucas Grandin		a wooden structure built on three floors that serves as a panoramic viewpoint on the Wouri River, as a botanical garden and as a dewdrop percussion organ.	10 meters high, 4,52x6,83 meters wide,		Municipality of Douala	
	Colonne Pascale	Carrefour Shell, New Bell, Douala, Cameroon 4.0212°N 9.7339°E	2010	Pascale Marthine Tayou		a sculpture made of pots in Vitreous enamel	12 meters high		Municipality of Douala	
