= List of public art in LaPorte County, Indiana =

This is a list of public art in LaPorte County, Indiana.

This list applies only to works of public art accessible in an outdoor public space. For example, this does not include artwork visible inside a museum.

Most of the works mentioned are sculptures. When this is not the case (i.e. sound installation, for example) it is stated next to the title.

== LaPorte ==
Title	Artist	Year	Location/GPS Coordinates	Material	Dimensions	Owner	Image
LaPorte County Superior Court Figures	Unknown		LaPorte County Courthouse	Limestone	2 figures. Each figure: approx. 8 ft. x 34 in. x 20 in.	LaPorte County Board of Commissioners	

== Michigan City ==
Title	Artist	Year	Location/GPS Coordinates	Material	Dimensions	Owner	Image
GAR Monument	Indiana Stone & Supply Company	1926	Greenwood Cemetery	Barre Granite	Sculpture: approx. 7 1/2 ft. x 40 in. x 40 in.		
Hybrid Figure	Richard Hunt	1978	Lubeznik Center for the Arts41°43′14.30″N 86°54′15.92″W	Bronze	Sculpture: approx. 85 x 34 x 23 in.		
Queen of All Saints	Bernard O. Gruenke & Nobert Schaaf	1966	Queen of All Saints Church41°42′20.04″N 86°52′23.69″W	Limestone	Each panel: approx. 85 x 265 x 3 in.	Queen of All Saints Church	
St. Stanislaus Kostka Entrance	William Rudolf O'Donovan, Jonathan Scott Hartley	ca. 1935	St. Stanislaus Church41°42′27.6″N 86°53′54.42″W	Concrete	2 angels. Tympanum: approx. 7 ft. x 167 in. x 6 in.; Each angel: approx. 6 ft. x 2 ft. x 20 in.	Roman Catholic Diocese of Gary	
Soldiers and Sailors Monument	William Rudolf O'Donovan, Jonathan Scott Hartley	1893	Washington Park41°43′24.96″N 86°54′18.04″W	Bronze, Granite	Sculpture: approx. H. 12 ft. x Diam. 30 in.; Base: approx. 17 x 16 x 16 ft.; Column: approx. H. 32 x Diam. 6 ft. (76 tons).	City of Michigan City	
Spanish–American War Veterans Monument	Unknown	1936	Old Lighthouse Museum	Bronze, Granite	Relief plaque: approx. 32 x 22 x 1 in.; Base: approx. 74 x 32 x 18 in.	City of Michigan City	
Untitled	Thomas S. Scarff	1985	Sprague Devices, 107 Eastwood Rd.41°43′34.78″N 86°50′8.56″W	Aluminum	Approx. 121 x 66 x 36 in.	Sprague Devices	
