= List of public art in São Paulo =

This is a list of public art on permanent public display in São Paulo, São Paulo (State), Brazil.

The list applies only to works of public art accessible in an outdoor public space; it does not include artwork on display inside museums. Public art may include sculptures, statues, monuments, memorials, murals and mosaics.

This list does not include military and war memorials.

== List of sculptures ==
Name	Image	Location	Artist	Year	Ref
Fauno		Tenente Siqueira Campos Park	Victor Brecheret	1942	
O Semeador		Praça Apecatu	Caetano Fraccaroli	1945	
Santo de Lisboa		Praça Padre Bento	Ferdinando Frick	1932	
Mãe Preta		Largo do Paiçandu	Julio Guerra	1955	

== List of statues ==
Name	Image	Location	Artist	Year	Ref
Borba Gato		Santo Amaro Avenue	Julio Guerra	1963	

== List of monuments and memorials ==
Name	Image	Location	Artist	Year	Ref
Monumento a Carlos Gomes		Praça Ramos	Luiz Brizzollara	1922	
Glória Imortal aos Fundadores de São Paulo		Pátio do Colégio	Amadeo Zani	1922	
Oitenta Anos da Imigração Japonesa		Treze de Maio Avenue	Tomie Ohtake	1988	
Monument to the Bandeiras (O Monumento às Bandeiras)		Ibirapuera Park	Victor Brecheret	1953	
Monumento a Federico Garcia Lorca		Praça das Guianas, Jardins	Flávio de Carvalho	1968	
Giuseppe Verdi		Rua Libero Badaró	Amadeo Zani	1915	
Monumento à Independência		Ipiranga	Ettore Ximenes	1922	
