= List of public art in Queens =

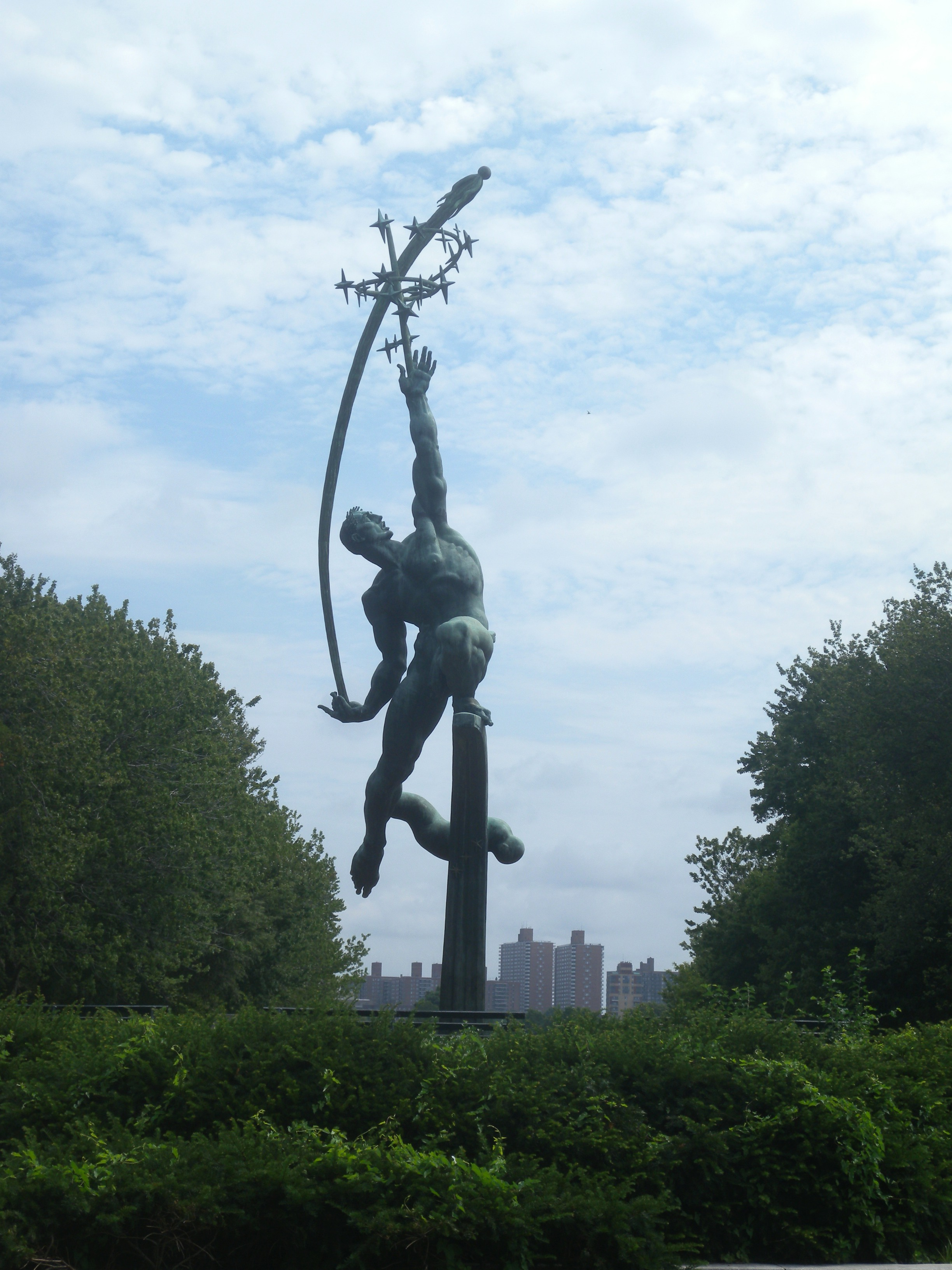
Rocket Thrower

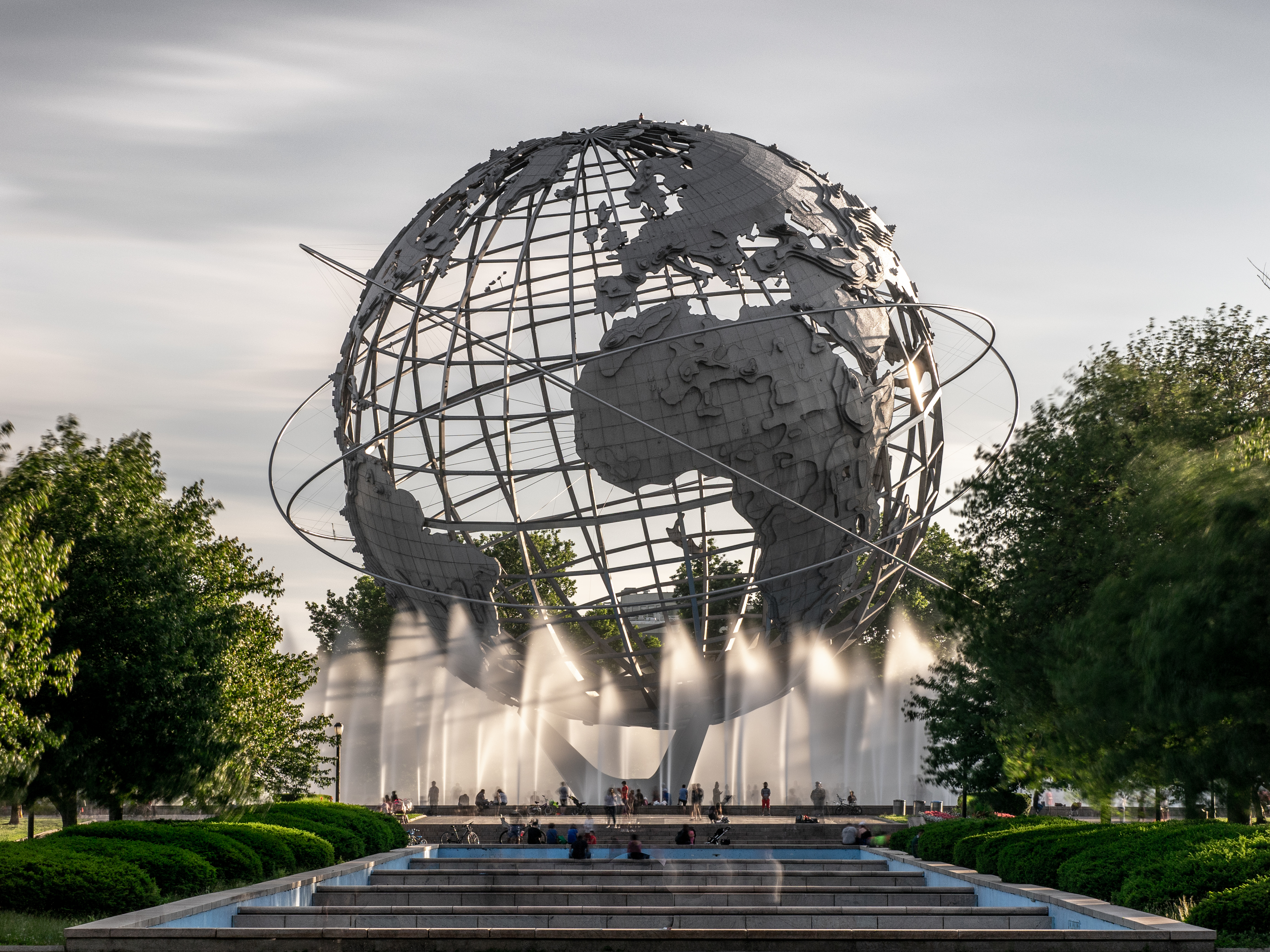
Unisphere, 2018

The following public artworks have been displayed in Queens, New York City:

- Benniger Memorial
  - It is located in Forest Park (Richmond Hill) as a memorial for the people who fought in WW1 and died.
  - The Benniger Memorial is also called the Forest Hill War Memorial.
  - The sculpture was created by Joseph Pollia and it represents a "doughboy".
- Civic Virtue by Frederick William MacMonnies, nude Hercules who made a scandal in City Hall Park and was banished to Kew Gardens, Queens and again to Green-Wood Cemetery, Brooklyn
- Crack of Dawn Sundial
- Cunningham Memorial Flagpole
- Dialogue with the Sun
- Education and Athletics
- The Family
- Foulk Plaque
- Four Figures Raising Arms
- Garden of Games, Gate, and Clock Tower
- Gatehouse to Knowledge
- Girl Weeding
- Girl with Fawn
- Glendale World War Memorial
- Justice Benjamin N. Cardozo
- Knowledge
- Landmind
- Long Island City World War Memorial
- Marconi Memorial
- Memorial Door, Antonio Latorraca (1938) by James Novelli
- Memorial Door, Bernard F. Golden
- Memorial Door, DeSalvio
- Memorial Door, John Lordi, Esq.
- Memorial Door, Mrs. C. LaGioia
- Morris Park War Memorial, or Morris Park World War Memorial
- P. S. 7 Botanical Sculptures and Gate
- The Pursuit of Learning
- Reach to the Stars
- Riis Memorial / Wise Clock
- Rockaway Beach World War Memorial
- Rocket Thrower by Donald De Lue, located in Flushing Meadows–Corona Park
- Thomas A. Edison
- Statue of Tom Seaver by William Behrends, located at Citi Field, Flushing, Queens
- Unisphere, a 12-story high, spherical stainless steel representation of the Earth located in Flushing Meadows–Corona Park
- Untitled by Alice Aycock
- Untitled by Jack Hastings
- Untitled (Hexagonal Sculpture)
- Vapor Trails
- Woodside War Memorial

== See also ==
- Socrates Sculpture Park on Vernon Blvd. and Broadway in Long Island City
