= List of public art in Blaenau Gwent =

Map of Wales with Blaenau Gwent highlighted

This is a list of public art in Blaenau Gwent, a county borough in south Wales that borders Monmouthshire and Torfaen to the east, Caerphilly to the west and Powys to the north. The area is governed by Blaenau Gwent County Borough Council. This list applies only to works of public art on permanent display in an outdoor public space and does not, for example, include artworks in museums.

== Abertillery ==
Image	Title / subject	Location and coordinates	Date	Artist / designer	Type	Material	Dimensions	Designation	Wikidata	Notes
	War memorial	Junction of Somersett St., and Queen St., Abertillery	1926	Captain George Howard Thomas MC	Statue on pedestal	Bronze & granite		Grade II	Q29499694	
More images	Guardian – memorial to the Six Bells Colliery disaster	Parc Arael Griffin, Abertillery	2010	Sebastien Boyesen	Sculpture on pillar	Steel & sandstone	12.6m high		Q19904147	

== Beaufort ==
Image	Title / subject	Location and coordinates	Date	Artist / designer	Type	Material	Dimensions	Designation	Wikidata	Notes
	Rassau and Beaufort war memorial	Beaufort			Pedestal on stepped base	Marble & stone				

== Blaina ==
Image	Title / subject	Location and coordinates	Date	Artist / designer	Type	Material	Dimensions	Designation	Wikidata	Notes
	Nantyglo & Blaina war memorial	Central Park, Blaina			Monolith	Stone				

== Brynmawr ==
Image	Title / subject	Location and coordinates	Date	Artist / designer	Type	Material	Dimensions	Designation	Wikidata	Notes
More images	War memorial	Market Square, Brynmawr	1927	R Price of Abergavenny (Mason)	Statue on pedestal	Granite				

== Cwm ==
Image	Title / subject	Location and coordinates	Date	Artist / designer	Type	Material	Dimensions	Designation	Wikidata	Notes
More images	Miner's Memorial Garden	Cwm	2009		Statue on pedestal	Stone				

== Ebbw Vale ==
Image	Title / subject	Location and coordinates	Date	Artist / designer	Type	Material	Dimensions	Designation	Wikidata	Notes
More images	War memorial	Libanus Road & Steelworks Road, Ebbw Vale	1924	Joseph Whitehead & Son	Statue on pedestal & steps	Granite with bronze plaques	7m high	Grade II	Q29499717	
More images	Echoes	Market Street, Ebbw Vale	2009		Pillar & clock	Steel	11m high			

== Llanhilleth ==
Image	Title / subject	Location and coordinates	Date	Artist / designer	Type	Material	Dimensions	Designation	Wikidata	Notes
	War memorial	Llanhilleth	1927		Plaque on pedestal	Bronze on brickwork				

== Tredegar ==
Image	Title / subject	Location and coordinates	Date	Artist / designer	Type	Material	Dimensions	Designation	Wikidata	Notes
More images	War memorial	Bedwellty Park, Tredegar	1924	Newbury Abbot Trent	Cross & statue on pedestal	Bronze & stone	9m high	Grade II	Q29499680	Cast at Morris Art Foundry.
More images	Aneurin Bevan Memorial Stones	Tredegar	c.1960		4 Monoliths	Granite				
More images	Chartist Memorial	Twyn Star, Dukestown, Tredegar			Plaque on pedestal	Bronze & stone				
