= List of public art in South Ayrshire =

Map of Scotland with the South Ayrshire council area highlighted

This is a list of public art in South Ayrshire, one of the 32 local government council areas of Scotland and covers the southern part of Ayrshire. The council area borders onto Dumfries and Galloway, East Ayrshire and North Ayrshire. This list applies only to works of public art on permanent display in an outdoor public space and does not, for example, include artworks in museums.

== Ayr ==
Image	Title / subject	Location and coordinates	Date	Artist / designer	Type	Material	Dimensions	Designation	Wikidata	Notes
More images	James George Smith Neill	Wellington Square, Ayr	1859	Matthew Noble	Statue on pedestal	Bronze and granite		Category B	Q17838465	
	Archibald Montgomerie, 13th Earl of Eglinton	Wellington Square, Ayr	1865	Matthew Noble	Statue on pedestal	Bronze and granite		Category B	Q17838485	
More images	Robert Burns	Burns Statue Square, Ayr	1892	George Anderson Lawson	Statue on pedestal with panels	Bronze and granite		Category B	Q17834540	
	Royal Scots Fusiliers memorial	Burns Statue Square, Ayr	1902	Thomas Brock	Statue on pedestal	Bronze and granite		Category B	Q17834558	
	Sir James Fergusson, 6th Baronet	Wellington Square, Ayr	1910	William Goscombe John	Statue on plinth	Bronze and stone		Category B	Q17838501	
	War memorial	Wellington Square, Ayr	1924	James Kennedy Hunter	Cenotaph on steps with plaques	Granite and bronze		Category C	Q77774062	
More images	Royal Scots Fusiliers World War II memorial	Place de Saint-Germain-en-Laye, Ayr	1960	Pilkington Jackson	Statue on pedestal with surround	Bronze			Q114168035	
	Reminiscence	The Fish Cross, Ayr	1995	Malcolm Robertson	Statue					

== Girvan ==
Image	Title / subject	Location and coordinates	Date	Artist / designer	Type	Material	Dimensions	Designation	Wikidata	Notes
	War memorial	Girvan	1922	Scott & Rae (Makers); James Morris (Architect)	Obelisk	Stone				

== Maybole ==
Image	Title / subject	Location and coordinates	Date	Artist / designer	Type	Material	Dimensions	Designation	Wikidata	Notes
More images	Covenanters Memorial	Maybole			Obelisk	Stone				
	Monument to Sir Charles Dalrymple Fergusson, 5th Baronet	Kildoon Hill, Maybole	1857		Obelisk	Stone				
	War memorial	Adjacent to golf course, Maybole	c. 1920s		Cenotaph with tablets	Stone and bronze				

== Monkton ==
Image	Title / subject	Location and coordinates	Date	Artist / designer	Type	Material	Dimensions	Designation	Wikidata	Notes
	War memorial	Monkton, South Ayrshire			Pillar	Granite				

== Prestwick ==
Image	Title / subject	Location and coordinates	Date	Artist / designer	Type	Material	Dimensions	Designation	Wikidata	Notes
	War memorial	The Cross, Prestwick	1921	J.A. Morris (architect)	Pillar cross with plaques	Stone and bronze				
	Icarus	International Aerospace Park, Prestwick	2004	Andy Scott	Statue	Bronze	2.5m tall			
		Glasgow Prestwick Airport			Kinetic sculpture	Metal				

== Troon ==
Image	Title / subject	Location and coordinates	Date	Artist / designer	Type	Material	Dimensions	Designation	Wikidata	Notes
	War memorial	South Beach Esplande, Troon	1924	Walter Gilbert	Statue on pedestal	Bronze and granite		Category B	Q17844642	
