= List of public art in Charlotte, North Carolina =

This is a list of public art in Charlotte, North Carolina.

IMAGE	ARTIST	TITLE	DATE	LOCATION	MATERIALS	DIMENSIONS
	Niki de Saint-Phalle	L'oiseau de feu sur l'arche/The Firebird on the Arch	1991	Bechtler Museum of Modern Art420 S Tryon St 35°13'27.7"N 80°50'51.0"W	Mosaic on polyester over steel armature	h: 17'5"
	David Černý	Metalmorphosis	2011	Whitehall Corporate Center 3701 Arco Corporate Dr 35°09'02.9"N 80°56'52.9"W	Stainless steel, motors, computer-driven control center, and water	h: 30' 14 tons
	Living Lenses (Po Shu Wang and Louise Bertelsen)	Sight Unseen	2012	Midtown Park S. Kings Dr. and Baxter St 35°12'39.7"N 80°50'10.4"W	Stainless steel	d: 7' 1600 pounds
	Andrew Leicester	Flying Shuttles	2005	Time Warner Cable Arena 333 E Trade St 35°13'30.8"N 80°50'25.7"W	Ceramic tile, brick, precast concrete, lighting device components, and steel (alloy)	h: 50'
	Raymond Kaskey	Queen Charlotte	1990	Charlotte Douglas International Airport 35°13'32.0"N 80°56'40.0"W	Bronze	h: 15' 2.5 tons
	Lorenzo Ghiglieri	Gold Miner	1991	UNC Charlotte 35°18'15.1"N 80°43'56.0"W	Bronze	h: 68"
	Dennis Oppenheim	Reconstructed Dwelling	2007	Tyvola Station, LYNX Blue Line 35°09'45.0"N 80°52'39.1"W	Steel, wood, roofing material, corrugated aluminum, backed aluminum sheet, structural acrylic	h: 24' w: 35' d: 40'
