= List of public art in Madison County, Indiana =

This is a list of public art in Madison County, Indiana.

This list applies only to works of public art accessible in an outdoor public space. For example, this does not include artwork visible inside a museum.

Most of the works mentioned are sculptures. When this is not the case (e.g., sound installation,) it is stated next to the title.

== Anderson ==
Title	Artist	Year	Location/GPS Coordinates	Material	Dimensions	Owner	Image
Charlie Ingersoll & Gertrude Pauline Hilligoss	Unknown	1892	Maplewood Cemetery 40°6′53.52″N 85°40′26.44″W	Marble, limestone	2 figures. Charlie: approx. 5 ft. 9 in. x 2 ft. x 2 ft.; Gertrude: approx. 4 ft. 6 in. x 2 ft. x 2 ft.	Maplewood Cemetery	
Christ the Good Shepherd	K. Williams	ca. 1955	Mounds Baptist Church 40°5′22.44″N 85°38′22.93″W	Limestone	Approx. 6 ft. x 44 in. x 1 in.	Mounds Baptist Church	
Dr. Martin Luther King, Jr.	Kenneth G. Ryden	1988	Martin Luther King, Jr. Park 40°5′39.24″N 85°41′30.22″W	Bronze	Figure: approx. 8 ft. x 2 ft. 6 in. x 2 ft. 6 in.	City of Anderson	
Helios	Arlon Bayliss	1993	Anderson University, Hartung Hall 40°6′42.36″N 85°39′53.87″W	Steel & Glass	Sculpture: approx. H. 11 1/2 ft. x Diam. 53 in.	Anderson University	
John Arch Morrison Commemorative Sculpture	Kenneth G. Ryden	1988	Anderson University40°6′41.14″N 85°39′56.62″W	Bronze	Sculpture: approx. 5 ft. 11 in. x 2 ft. 6 in. x 2 ft. 6 in.	Anderson University	
Passages	Jim Johnson	1987	Anderson University, Krannert Fine Arts Center Hall	Cor-Ten Steel	Sculpture: approx. 15 x 7 x 2 ft.	Anderson University	

== Chesterfield ==
Title	Artist	Year	Location/GPS Coordinates	Material	Dimensions	Owner	Image
Trail of Religion	Ivan Adams	1943	Camp Chesterfield	Marble & Paint	10 busts. Busts each: approx. 3 ft. x 2 ft. x 1 ft. 6 in.	Camp Chesterfield	
