= List of public art in Hannover =

This is a list of public art in Hanover, in Germany. This list applies only to works of public art accessible in an outdoor public space. For example, this does not include artwork visible inside a museum.

Image	Title / subject	Location and coordinates	Date	Artist / designer	Type	Material	Dimensions	Designation	Notes
	Nanas	Hannover		Niki de Saint Phalle					
