= List of public art in Evansville, Indiana =

This is a list of public art in Evansville, Indiana.

This list applies only to works of public art accessible in an outdoor public space. It does not include artwork in a museum.

Most of the works mentioned are sculptures. When this is not the case (i.e., sound installations, for example) it is stated next to the title.

== Evansville ==
Title	Artist	Year	Location/GPS Coordinates	Material	Dimensions	Owner	Image
Blessed Mary of the Assumption	Unknown	1872	Corpus Christi Catholic Church37°58′59.79″N 87°38′33.85″W	Marble	Statue: approx. 83 x 36 x 21 in.; Base: approx. 21 x 80 x 43 in.	Roman Catholic Diocese of Evansville	
Celestial Quest	Timothy Fitzgerald	1992	Evansville Museum of Arts and Sciences	Stainless steel	Approx. 20 ft. x 80 in. x 67 in.	Evansville Museum of Arts and Sciences	
Christ the King	Kaletta Company		Christ the King School 37°57′57.24″N 87°30′45.75″W	Concrete	Sculpture: approx. 80 x 19 x 16 in.	Christ the King Catholic Church	
Crucifixion and Stations of the Cross	John Lehnhoff	1908	St. Joseph Catholic Cemetery	Cast metal	Crucifixion: approx. 20 ft. x 7 ft. x 30 in.; Crucifixion base: approx. 8 x 7 x 7 ft.; Stations: approx. 70 x 31 x 14 in.; Station bases: approx. 58 x 50 x 32.	St. Joseph Catholic Cemetery	
Desert Shield Desert Storm Monument	Steve Shields	1993		Copper		City of Evansville	
Editorial Without Words	Chris Navarro		Hadi Shrine 37°58′4.09″N 87°34′26.5″W	Bronze		Shriners Hospitals for Children	
Flowing River	John McNaughton	1976	Evansville Museum of Arts and Science37°57′54.32″N 87°34′24.64″W	Steel	Approx. 10 ft. x 11 ft. x 3 ft. 6 in.	Evansville Museum of Arts and Science	
Four Freedoms Monument	Rupert Condict	1976	Riverfront, Riverside Dr.	Indiana Limestone		City of Evansville	
Korean War Memorial	Amy Musia	1993	Riverfront, Riverside Dr.	Stainless Steel & Granite		City of Evansville	
Old Vanderburgh County Courthouse Figures	Frank Englsmann	1888–1891	Old Vanderburgh County Courthouse 37°58′26.04″N 87°34′19.92″W	Indiana limestone	14 figures. Each figure: 12 x 6 x 5 ft.; Each figure group: 12 x 25 x 5 ft.	Old Courthouse Preservation Society	
Recording Angel			St. Joseph Catholic Cemetery	Marble	Angel: approx. 65 x 23 x 32 in.	St. Joseph Catholic CemetRecording AngelOld Vanderburgh County Courthouse Figures, (sculpture)	
St. Benedict	Unknown	1912	St. Benedict Catholic School 37°58′16.17″N 87°32′27.47″W	Limestone	Approx. 8 x 3 1/2 x 3 ft.	Roman Catholic Diocese of Evansville	
Spirit of 1861	George Honig	1916	Soldiers and Sailors Memorial Coliseum 37°58′26.97″N 87°34′23.53″W	Bronze	$180,000	Vanderburgh County Veterans Council	
Spirit of 1916	George Honig	1916	Soldiers and Sailors Memorial Coliseum37°58′26.97″N 87°34′23.53″W	Bronze		Vanderburgh County Veterans Council	
Sunbird	Steve Shields	1992	University of Southern Indiana	Copper & Sandstone		City of Evansville	
The Bend in the River	Amy Musia	1993	Riverfront, Riverside Dr.37°57′56.48″N 87°34′25.74″W	Stainless Steel & Granite		City of Evansville	
The World's Largest	John McNaughton		The Centre37°58′21.88″N 87°33′57.57″W	Stainless Steel		City of Evansville	
Untitled	Jim Greer	1974	University of Southern Indiana	Painted steel	Approx. 14 ft. 4 in. x 6 ft. 8 in. x 9 ft. 10 in.	University of Southern Indiana	
Untitled	Ed Rheem	1972	Teamsters' Local 21537°58′20.69″N 87°33′52.32″W	Fiberglass	Six pieces. Approx. 140 x 255 x 324 in.	Teamster's Local 215	
Ziemer Monument	Henry Mursinna, D.A. Bohlen (architects)	1872	St. Joseph Catholic Cemetery	Limestone	Figure: approx. 101 x 32 x 26 in.	St. Joseph Catholic Cemetery	
