= List of public art in Monmouthshire =

Map of Wales with Monmouthshire highlighted

This is a list of public art in Monmouthshire. This list applies only to works of public art on permanent display in an outdoor public space. For example, this does not include artworks in museums.

== Abergavenny ==
Image	Title / subject	Location and coordinates	Date	Artist / designer	Type	Material	Dimensions	Designation	Owner / administrator	Wikidata	Notes
More images	Memorial to 3rd Battalion of the Monmouthshire Regiment	Frogmore Street, Abergavenny	1921	Gilbert Ledward	Sculpture on a pedestal	Bronze and granite	5m high	Grade II		Q29493386	
	Old Brewery Yard sign	Abergavenny	2009	Howard Boycott	Sculpture	Slate					

== Caldicot ==
Image	Title / subject	Location and coordinates	Date	Artist / designer	Type	Material	Dimensions	Designation	Owner / administrator	Wikidata	Notes
	Caldicot Cross War Memorial	Newport Road, Caldicot	1996	Howard Boycott	Two-part celtic cross	Welsh slate	5m high				

== Chepstow ==
Image	Title / subject	Location and coordinates	Date	Artist / designer	Type	Material	Dimensions	Designation	Owner / administrator	Wikidata	Notes
More images	Chepstow War Memorial	Beaufort Square	1922	Eric Francis	Pillar with urn	Stone with bronze plaques		Grade II			
More images	Boatman	High Street	2004–2005	André Wallace	Statue	Bronze and stone	2.44 m high				
	6 carved spheres and 12 lettered panels	High Street 51.641809°N 2.675274°W	2005	Tim Shutter and others	Sculpture	Dunhouse sandstone	Spheres 67.5cm diam		Monmouthshire County Council		Part of the refurbishment of Chepstow High Street

== Magor ==
Image	Title / subject	Location and coordinates	Date	Artist / designer	Type	Material	Dimensions	Designation	Owner / administrator	Wikidata	Notes
	War Memorial	Magor Square, Magor	1924		Shrine-type monument	Stone		Grade II		Q29493762	

== Monmouth ==
Image	Title / subject	Location and coordinates	Date	Artist / designer	Type	Material	Dimensions	Designation	Owner / administrator	Wikidata	Notes
	Henry V	The Shire Hall, Agincourt Square, Monmouth	1792	Charles Peart	Statue						
More images	Overmonnow Cross	Overmonnow, Monmouth	1888	F A Powell, H Wall of Newport (carving)	Column with medieval elements	Stone		Grade II		Q514732	Modern figures by Philip Chatfield.
More images	Statue of Charles Rolls	Agincourt Square, Monmouth	1911	Goscombe John	Statue on pedestal	Bronze and granite		Grade II*		Q7604480	
	War Memorial of the Royal Monmouthshire Royal Engineers	Castle Hill, Monmouth	c.1920		Celtic cross	Granite		Grade II		Q7968486	
More images	Monmouth War Memorial	St James Square, Monmouth	1921	Reginard Harding & W Clarke of Llandaff (sculptor)	Statue on pedestal	Stone	5.4m high	Grade II		Q6901135	

== Usk ==
Image	Title / subject	Location and coordinates	Date	Artist / designer	Type	Material	Dimensions	Designation	Owner / administrator	Wikidata	Notes
More images	Jubilee Clock Tower	Twyn Square, Usk	1887		Clock tower	Red brick and terracotta		Grade II		Q29482306	Erected to mark the Golden Jubilee of Queen Victoria, repositioned in 1970s.
	Boer War memorial	New Market Street, Usk	1908	R Price of Abergavenny	Pillar	Granite		Grade II			
	War memorial	Grounds of Priory Church of St Mary's, Usk	1922		Latin cross	Granite					
