= List of public art in Buckinghamshire =

This is a list of public art in Buckinghamshire, in England. This list applies only to works of public art accessible in an outdoor public space. For example, this does not include any artworks in a museum or private collection.

== Aylesbury ==
Image	Title / subject	Location and coordinates	Date	Artist / designer	Type	Material	Dimensions	Designation	Wikidata	Notes
More images	John Hampden	Market Square, Aylesbury	1911	Henry Charles Fehr	Statue on pedestal	Bronze and stone		Grade II	Q26647298	
More images	War memorial	Market Square, Aylesbury	1921	Fred Taylor (architect)	Cross with surround and plaques	Portland stone and bronze		Grade II	Q48807183	

== Burnham ==
Image	Title / subject	Location and coordinates	Date	Artist / designer	Type	Material	Dimensions	Designation	Wikidata	Notes
	War memorial	Town Park, High Street, Burnham, Buckinghamshire	1920	Leonard Stanford Merrifield	Celtic cross with statue	Stone		Grade II	Q66478180	

== Denham ==
Image	Title / subject	Location and coordinates	Date	Artist / designer	Type	Material	Dimensions	Designation	Wikidata	Notes
	Uxbridge Galleries (name)	under the A40 near the Grand Union Canal, Denham		various		graffiti	~20,000 sq ft.	Grade II		

== High Wycombe ==
Image	Title / subject	Location and coordinates	Date	Artist / designer	Type	Material	Dimensions	Designation	Wikidata	Notes
	Red lion	High Street, High Wycombe						Grade II		Above the former Woolworths store

== Marlow ==
Image	Title / subject	Location and coordinates	Date	Artist / designer	Type	Material	Dimensions	Designation	Wikidata	Notes
More images	War memorial	High Street / The Causeway, Marlow, Buckinghamshire	1920	W Henry Wright & T Hansford-White	Cross with relief	Stone and bronze	7.1m high	Grade II	Q26677358	
More images	Memorial to Charles Frohman	The Causeway, Marlow, Buckinghamshire	1924	Leonard Stanford Merrifield	Statue with drinking fountain	Stone		Grade II	Q26418122	Frohman died in the 1915 sinking of the RMS Lusitania.
More images	Sir Steve Redgrave	Higginson Park, Marlow, Buckinghamshire	2002	Neale Andrew	Statue	Bronze				Unveiled by Queen Elizabeth II on 10 May 2002.

== Milton Keynes ==
Image	Title / subject	Location and coordinates	Date	Artist / designer	Type	Material	Dimensions	Designation	Wikidata	Notes
	O Wert Thou in the cold Blast	Station Concourse, Milton Keynes				Scottish Granite		Grade II		
