= List of public art in Flintshire =

Map of Wales with Flintshire highlighted

This is a list of public art in Flintshire, north-east Wales. Flintshire borders the English county of Cheshire to the east, Denbighshire to the west and Wrexham County Borough to the south. It is named after the historic county of Flintshire which had very different borders. This list applies only to works of public art on permanent display in an outdoor public space and does not, for example, include artworks in museums.

== Bagillt ==
Image	Title / subject	Location and coordinates	Date	Artist / designer	Type	Material	Dimensions	Designation	Wikidata	Notes
	War memorial	High Street, Bagillt	1923		Statue on pedestal	Marble				

== Buckley ==
Image	Title / subject	Location and coordinates	Date	Artist / designer	Type	Material	Dimensions	Designation	Wikidata	Notes
	Servicemen and women memorial	Royal British Legion, Buckley	1983–84		Cenotaph and sculpture	Stone and steel				
	Alyn and Deeside Coat of Arms	Buckley			Relief	Terracotta				

== Caergwrle ==
Image	Title / subject	Location and coordinates	Date	Artist / designer	Type	Material	Dimensions	Designation	Wikidata	Notes
More images	War memorial	Wrexham Road, Caergwrle			Celtic cross on stepped base	Stone	3m high			

== Caerwys ==
Image	Title / subject	Location and coordinates	Date	Artist / designer	Type	Material	Dimensions	Designation	Wikidata	Notes
	Arthur Roberts memorial	Caerwys			Monolith	Slate				

== Connah's Quay ==
Image	Title / subject	Location and coordinates	Date	Artist / designer	Type	Material	Dimensions	Designation	Wikidata	Notes
	Connah's Quay and Shotton War Memorial	High Street, Connah's Quay	1924	Edward Jones (builder)	Cross on pedestal	Stone		Grade II	Q29506918	

== Ffynnongroyw ==
Image	Title / subject	Location and coordinates	Date	Artist / designer	Type	Material	Dimensions	Designation	Wikidata	Notes
	War memorial	All Saints Church, Ffynnongroyw	1994		Pillar with urn	Granite				

== Flint ==
Image	Title / subject	Location and coordinates	Date	Artist / designer	Type	Material	Dimensions	Designation	Wikidata	Notes
	Boer War memorial	Chapel Street, Flint	1903		Obelisk	Pink granite				
	War memorial	Chapel Street, Flint		W. B. Edwards (architect)	Cenotaph	Stone				
	Footplate	Railway Station, Flint		Brian Fell	Sculpture	Metal				

== Hawarden ==
Image	Title / subject	Location and coordinates	Date	Artist / designer	Type	Material	Dimensions	Designation	Wikidata	Notes
	William and Catherine Gladstone fountain	Glynne Way, Hawarden	1889	Edward O. Griffith	Three-sided fountain	Stone		Grade II	Q29492856	Erected to mark the golden wedding of William and Catherine Gladstone.
	Saint Deiniol	Gladstone's Library, Hawarden	1902	John Douglas	Statue	Stone		Grade I		
	Second Boer War memorial	St Deiniol's Church, Hawarden			Tapering cross on hexagonal base	Stone				
More images	War memorial	Gladstone Way, Hawarden	1920	Giles Gilbert Scott	Obelisk with niche	Sandstone	9.1m high	Grade II	Q29492871	Niche holds figure of Christ on the Cross.
More images	William Ewart Gladstone	Grounds of Gladstone's Library, Hawarden	Erected 1925	John Hughes	Statue on pedestal	Bronze and stone		Grade II	Q29492802	Originally commissioned in 1910 for Dublin.

== Mold ==
Image	Title / subject	Location and coordinates	Date	Artist / designer	Type	Material	Dimensions	Designation	Wikidata	Notes
	Hallelujah Obelisk	Rhual, near Mold	1736		Obelisk	Stone				Marks the site of a battle of AD 420.
More images	Daniel Owen	Daniel Owen Precinct, Mold, Flintshire	1896	Goscombe John	Statue on pedestal	Bronze & stone		Grade II	Q29480968	
	War memorial	Bailey Hill, Mold, Flintshire	1926	W. B. Edwards	Cenotaph	Portland stone				
	Daniel Owen	Mold, Flintshire			Monolith	Stone				
	Steam Wheel sculpture	Chester Road, Mold, Flintshire								

== Rhosesmor ==
Image	Title / subject	Location and coordinates	Date	Artist / designer	Type	Material	Dimensions	Designation	Wikidata	Notes
	War memorial	Rhosesmor	1920s		Cross on pedestal	Sandstone & limestone		Grade II	Q29503098	
