= List of public art in Falkirk =

Map of Scotland with the Falkirk council area highlighted

This is a list of public art in Falkirk, Scotland, and includes works in the Falkirk council area. This list applies only to works of public art on permanent display in an outdoor public space and does not, for example, include artworks in museums.

== Airth ==
Image	Title / subject	Location and coordinates	Date	Artist / designer	Type	Material	Dimensions	Designation	Wikidata	Notes
More images	Mercat cross	Airth			Cross on pillar and steps			Category A	Q15119707	

== Avonbridge ==
Image	Title / subject	Location and coordinates	Date	Artist / designer	Type	Material	Dimensions	Designation	Wikidata	Notes
	War memorial	Avonbridge			Cross on plinth	Stone				

== Blackness ==
Image	Title / subject	Location and coordinates	Date	Artist / designer	Type	Material	Dimensions	Designation	Wikidata	Notes
	War memorial	Blackness	1922	Messers Galt & Barr, Glasgow (architects), Wm.Roberts & Son (sculptors), Mr Grierson (clockmaker)	Column	Granite				Originally erected with a clock, now missing

== Bo'ness ==
Image	Title / subject	Location and coordinates	Date	Artist / designer	Type	Material	Dimensions	Designation	Wikidata	Notes
	War memorial	Bo'ness	1924	Messers Galt & Barr, Glasgow (architects)	Two-stage Obelisk	Portland stone with bronze features		Category C	Q77780403	

== Falkirk ==
Image	Title / subject	Location and coordinates	Date	Artist / designer	Type	Material	Dimensions	Designation	Wikidata	Notes
More images	Boer War memorial	Newmarket Street, Falkirk	1906	William Grant Stevenson	Statue group on pedestal	Bronze and stone		Category C	Q56633090	
	John de Graeme memorial	Falkirk	1912		Drinking fountain	Stone				
More images	Battle of Falkirk Muir memorial	Falkirk	1927		Octagonal column	Stone				
	Battle of Falkirk memorial	Falkirk			Cairn	Stone				
More images	The Kelpies	The Helix	2014	Andy Scott	Sculpture	Stainless steel	30m high		Q16988858	

== Grangemouth ==
Image	Title / subject	Location and coordinates	Date	Artist / designer	Type	Material	Dimensions	Designation	Wikidata	Notes
	War memorial	Zetland Park, Grangemouth	1923	John James Burnet (Designer), Alexander Proudfoot (Sculptor)	Cenotaph with lion & eagle sculpture	Stone	8.2m high	Category B	Q56561141	

== Larbert ==
Image	Title / subject	Location and coordinates	Date	Artist / designer	Type	Material	Dimensions	Designation	Wikidata	Notes
	James Bruce memorial	Old Parish Churchyard, Larbert		William Haworth for Carron Ironworks	Obelisk	Cast iron		Category A		

== Laurieston ==
Image	Title / subject	Location and coordinates	Date	Artist / designer	Type	Material	Dimensions	Designation	Wikidata	Notes
More images	War memorial	Laurieston	1920		Cross on pedestal	Stone				

== Longcroft ==
Image	Title / subject	Location and coordinates	Date	Artist / designer	Type	Material	Dimensions	Designation	Wikidata	Notes
	War memorial	Longcroft	1921		Obelisk	Stone				

== Slamannan ==
Image	Title / subject	Location and coordinates	Date	Artist / designer	Type	Material	Dimensions	Designation	Wikidata	Notes
More images	G R P Waddell memorial	Slamannan			Clock tower on pedestal	Stone pedestal				
More images	War memorial	Slamannan	1921		Pillar with 3 lion sculptures	Red granite & stone				
