= O-Train public art =

Public art in the Ottawa light rail system

This article catalogues public art on the O-Train. More information may be found in the individual station articles.

Station	Line	Title	Artist	Description	Photo
Bayview	Line 1 (O-Train) Line 2 (O-Train)	As the Crow Flies	Adrian Göllner	Tubular steel and fencing depicting the silhouettes of various Ottawa buildings and the flight line of a crow, used as a 120-metre barrier between the tracks	
Bayview	Line 1 (O-Train) Line 2 (O-Train)	Cascades	Pierre Poussin	Laser-cut aluminum sculpture inspired by the Chaudière Falls	
Blair	Line 1 (O-Train)	Lightscape	cj fleury and Catherine Widgery	Suspended screens with small pieces of glass	
Carleton	Line 2 (O-Train)	locomOtion	Stuart Kinmond	Aluminum sculpture with red panels inspired by OC Transpo's logo	
Cyrville	Line 1 (O-Train)	The Stand of Birch	Don Maynard	Stainless steel art of 13 trees and grasses	
Hurdman	Line 1 (O-Train)	Coordinated Movement	Jill Anholt	Metal structure depicting birds' flight patterns	
Lees	Line 1 (O-Train)	Transparent Passage	Amy Thompson	Painted glass depicting the Rideau River and sculpture of a bird in flight	
Lyon	Line 1 (O-Train)	This Images Relies on Positive Thinking	Geoff McFetridge	Paintings on the station's walls	
Lyon	Line 1 (O-Train)	With Words as Their Actions	PLANT Architect	Stainless steel installations honouring the founders of the Women's Canadian Historical Society and member Anne Dewar's The Last Days of Bytown	
Parliament	Line 1 (O-Train)	Lone Pine Sunset	Douglas Coupland	Cubist interpretation of Tom Thomson's The Jack Pine	
Parliament	Line 1 (O-Train)	Trails: home and away	Jennifer Stead	Steel panels depicting low-growing Canadian plants	
Pimisi	Line 1 (O-Train)	Eel Spirit, Basket, and Fence	Nadia Myre	Art pieces depicting an eel, woven basket, and birch trees, significant to the Algonquin people	
Pimisi	Line 1 (O-Train)	Màmawi: Together	Simon Brascoupé, Emily Brascoupé-Hoefler, Sherry-Ann Rodgers, Doreen Stevens, and Sylvia Tennisco	100 painted canoe paddles arranged in the shape of a canoe.	
Pimisi	Line 1 (O-Train)	Algonquin Moose	Simon Brascoupé	Sculpture of a moose	
Pimisi	Line 1 (O-Train)	Algonquin Birch Bark Biting Window Art	Simon Brascoupé, Claire Brascoupé, and Mairi Brascoupé	Depictions of Algonquin birch bark biting on the station's windows	
Rideau	Line 1 (O-Train)	FLOW / FOTS	Geneviève Cadieux	Glass screens with image of water flow	
Rideau	Line 1 (O-Train)	The shape this takes to get to that	Jim Verburg	Murals along the station escalators	
St-Laurent	Line 1 (O-Train)	Untitled	Andrew Morrow	Three murals depicting Canadian history	
Tremblay	Line 1 (O-Train)	National Garden	Jyhling Lee	Silhouettes of the official flowers of Canada's provinces and territories and the City of Ottawa	
Tunney's Pasture	Line 1 (O-Train)	Gradient Space	Derek Root	Coloured mosaics along the platforms and a stained-glass skylight	
uOttawa	Line 1 (O-Train)	Train of Thought	Derek Michael Besant	Series of portraits with shifting appearance	
uOttawa	Line 1 (O-Train)	Sphere Field	Kenneth Emig	Mirrored sphere sculpture in a glass cube case	
