= List of public art in Varberg =

This article is a list of public art in Varberg, Sweden.

Image	Work of art (translation)	Artist	Year	Location	Coordinates
	Badande ungdom ("Bathing youth")	Bror Marklund	1937	Marketplace	57°6′18.27″N 12°15′2.84″E
	På kyrkstigen ("On the church path")	Erik Nilsson	1944	English Park	57°6′24.42″N 12°14′50.93″E
	Gustav Ullmanstatyn ("Statue of Gustav Ullman")	Nanna Ullman	1948	Varberg Fortress	57°6′26.83″N 12°14′24.89″E
	Maj ("May")	Emil Näslund	1950	Close to marketplace	57°6′17.24″N 12°15′3.84″E
	Askungen ("Cinderella")	Stig Blomberg	1950	Queen Blanka's Place	57°6′3.04″N 12°15′7.01″E
	Gossen med guldgåsen ("The boy with the golden goose")	Einar Luterkort	1950	Society Park	57°6′26.02″N 12°14′36.14″E
	Vårflickan ("The springtime girl")	Edvin Öhrström	1950	Near the People's House	
	I sommarhagen ("In the summer pen")	Emil Näsvall	1951	Krabbes väg 6-8	57°5′58″N 12°14′53.67″E
	Gäddleken ("The pike play")	Clarence Blum	1955	Close to marketplace	57°6′17.39″N 12°14′59.97″E
	Månfisken ("The moon fish")	Lennart A-son	1961	Sparbanken Hall	
	Idrottsmotiv ("Sports picture")	Bertil Lundgren	1964	Sports hall at Danska vägen	57°5′57.09″N 12°15′15.17″E
	Hästen och bonden ("The horse and the farmer")	Nanna Ullman	1965	South of city center	57°6′8.76″N 12°15′0.25″E
	Ung flicka ("Young girl")	Åke Jönsson	1968	Östergården old people's home	
	Torellbrunnen ("Torell well")	Edvin Öhrström	1970	Trädgården shopping centre	57°6′22.46″N 12°14′54.08″E
	Livscykeln ("Cycle of life")	Bernard Andersson	1975	Brunnsparken	57°6′22.05″N 12°14′57.75″E
	Sörjande moder ("Sorrow mother")	Tore Heby	1978	Saint George's Cemetery	
	Kram ("Embrace")	Lennart Linjer	1983	Borgmästaregatan 29	57°6′24.23″N 12°15′15.59″E
	Vattenstenar ("Waterstones")	Matti Rylander	1985	Society Park	57°6′24.25″N 12°14′36.7″E
	Kvinnogestalt ("Woman figure")	Peter Mandl	1988	Saint George's Cemetery	
	Klyvning ("Splitting")	Roland Ohlsson	1992	Torggatan	57°6′20.37″N 12°14′56.32″E
	Ett 650-årsminne ("A 650 year memorial")	Harry Kivijärvi	1993	Varberg Fortress	57°6′13.44″N 12°14′26.85″E
	Musica	Peter Mandl	1994	Kungsgatan	57°6′29.2″N 12°15′1.4″E
	Spirande snäcka ("Spire shell")	Walter Bengtsson	1996	Marina	57°6′30.15″N 12°14′35.99″E
	Hålrum ("Hole")	Eva Hild	2006	University branch	57°6′28.87″N 12°14′40.02″E
	Kraka	Gustaf Nordahl		Bandholtzgatan 16	57°5′56.65″N 12°14′52.11″E
	Jüngling von Naims (German: "Yong man from Naims")	Hanspeter Widrig		Varberg Hospital	57°5′58.42″N 12°16′42.38″E
