= List of fountains in the Kansas City metropolitan area =

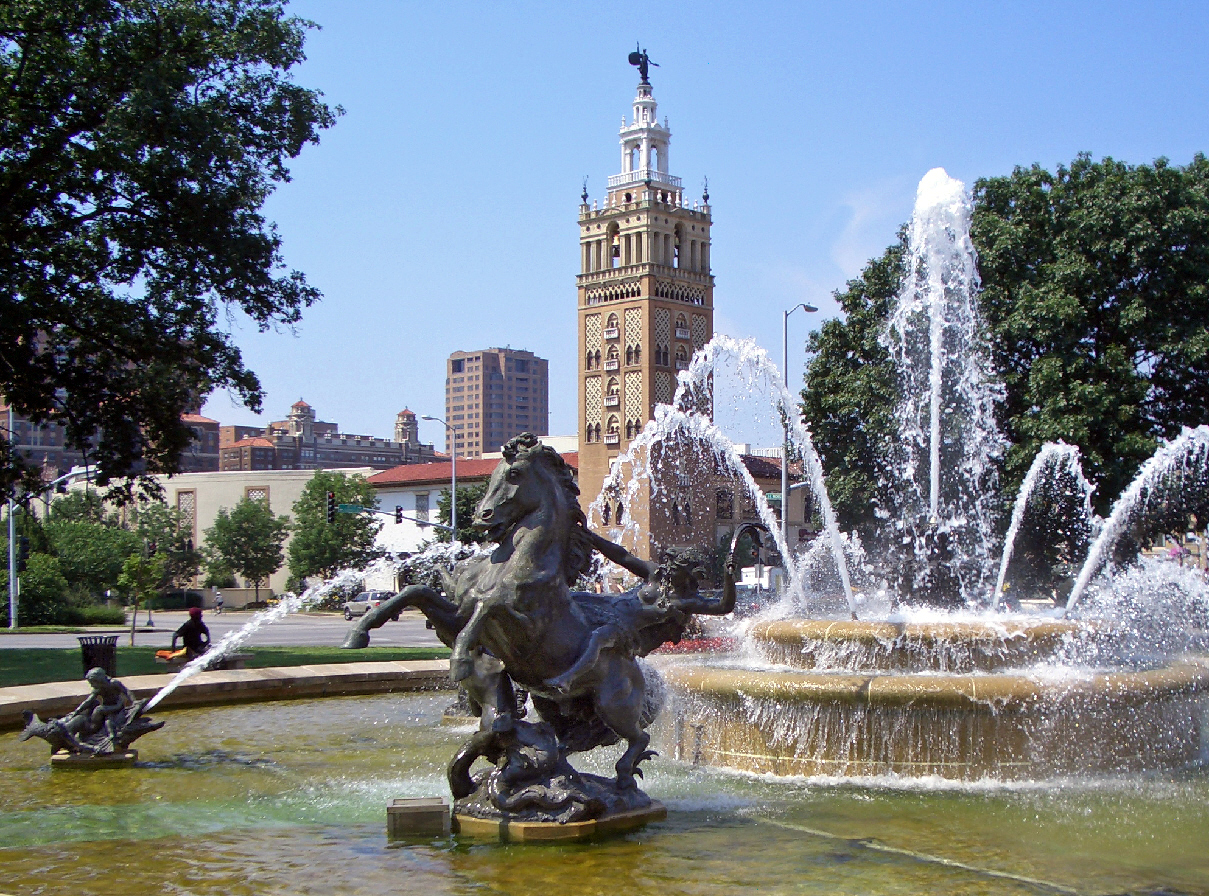
J.C. Nichols Memorial Fountain, by Henri-Léon Gréber (1910, reinstalled in Kansas City and dedicated in 1960) at 47th Street and J.C. Nichols Parkway, Country Club Plaza

Muse of the Missouri, by Wheeler Williams, downtown, Main Street at 9th Street

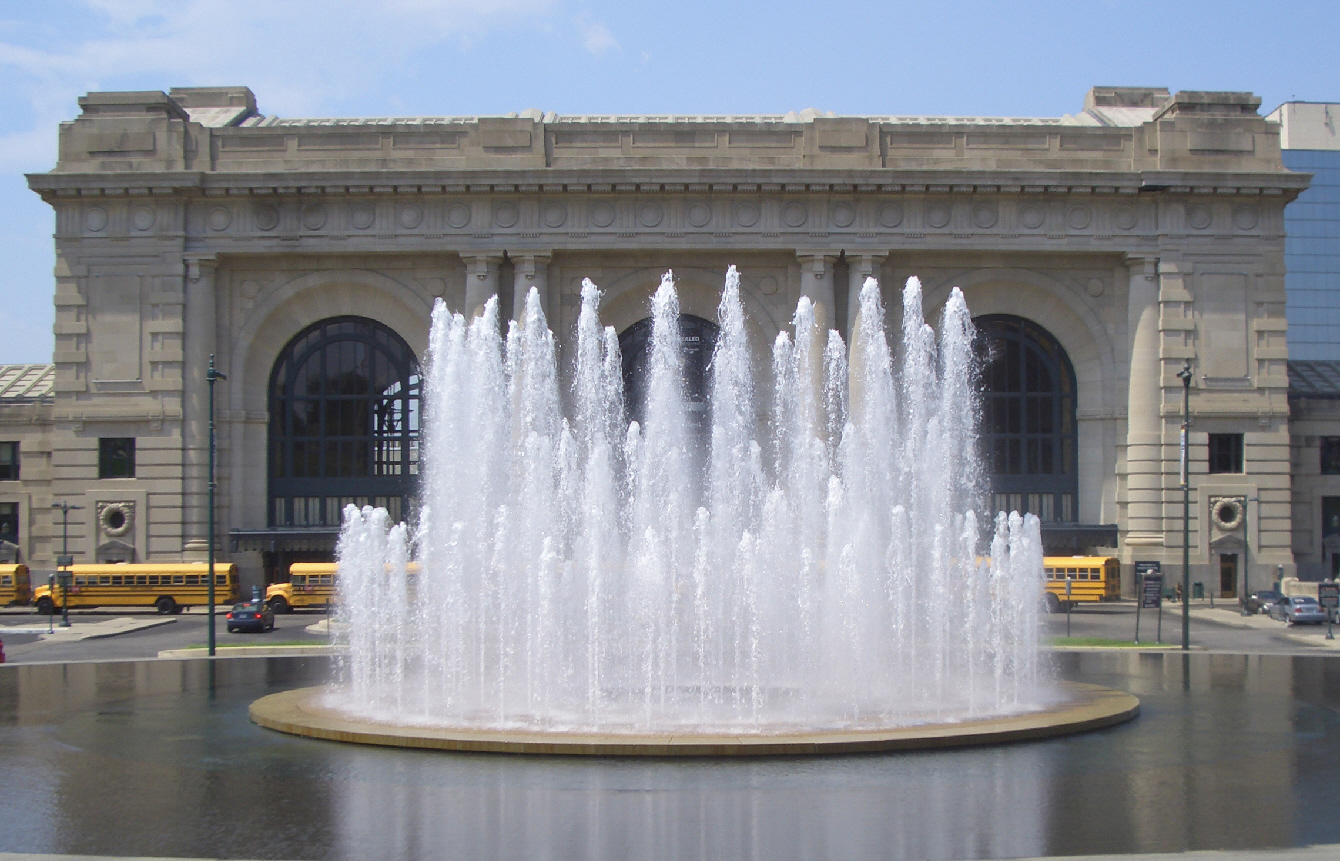
Henry Wollman Bloch Fountain, in front of Union Station, at W. Pershing Road at Main Street

Children's Fountain, by Tom Corbin, at Oak Trafficway & Burlington (MO Hwy 9)

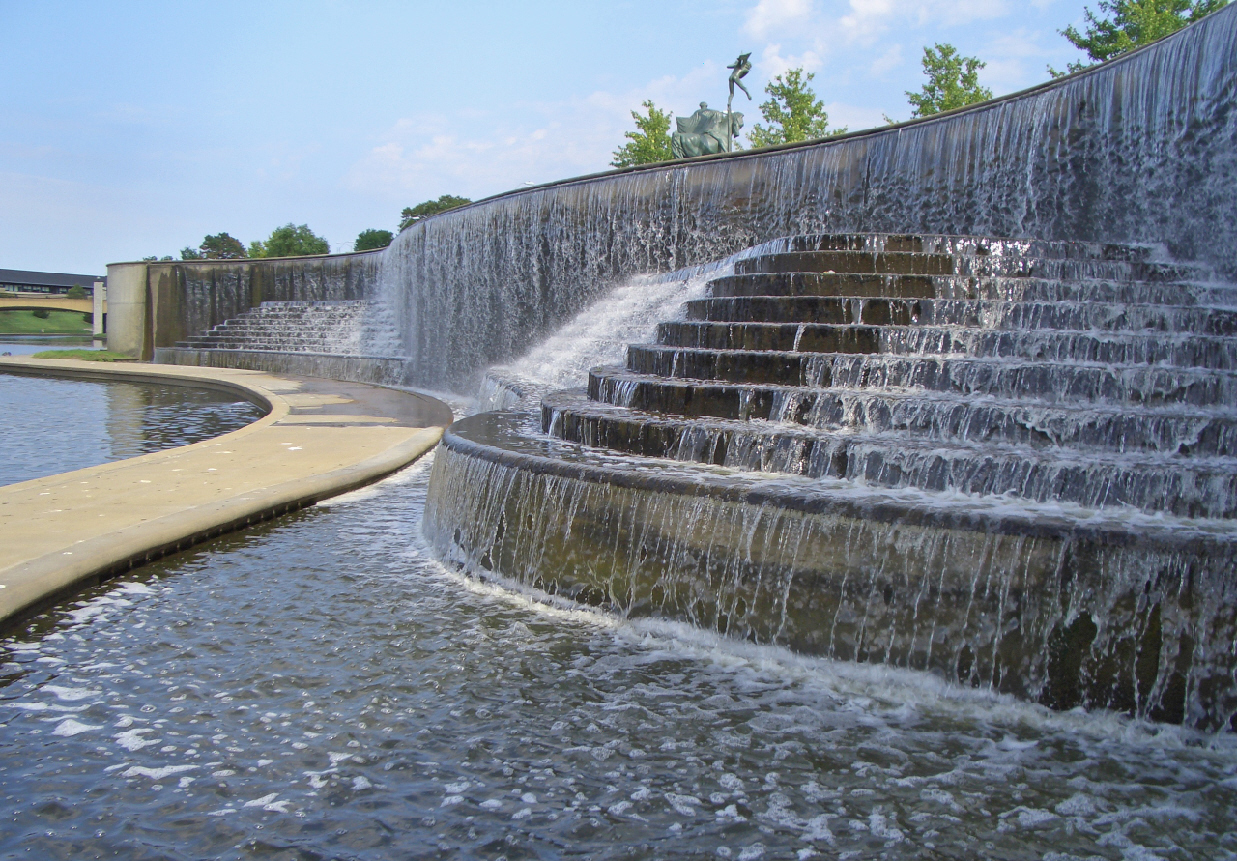
Volker Fountain, 28-foot-high (8.5 m) waterfall and basin along Brush Creek, Volker Boulevard, between Oak St. and Rockhill Road

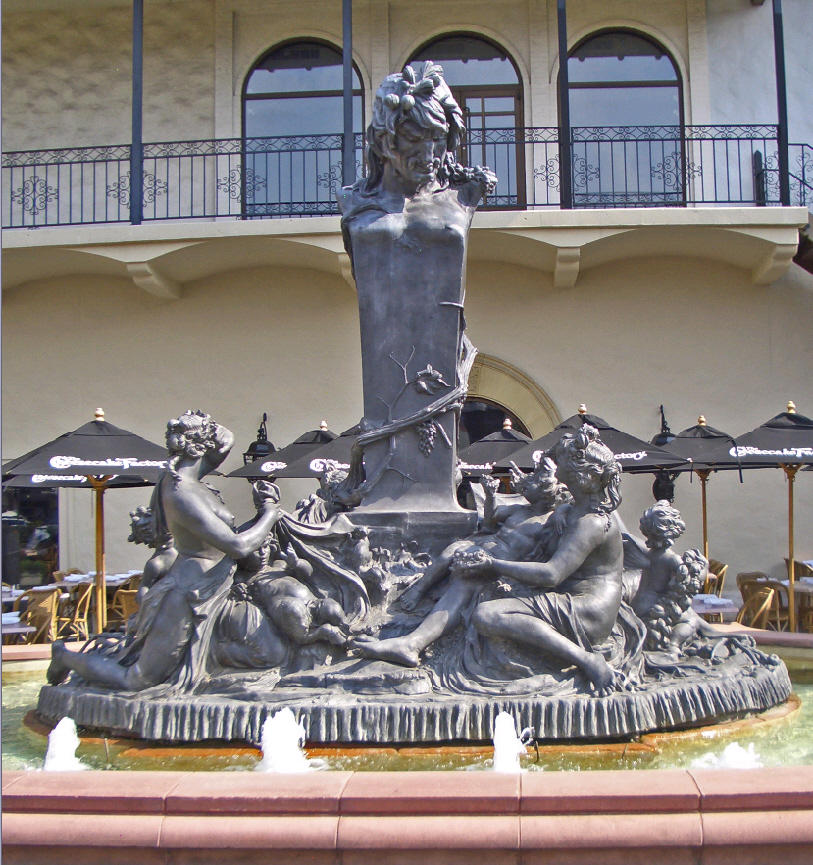
Fountain of Bacchus, W. 47th Street at Chandler Court in the Plaza. The main sculpture is made of 10,000 lb (4,500 kg) of cast lead.

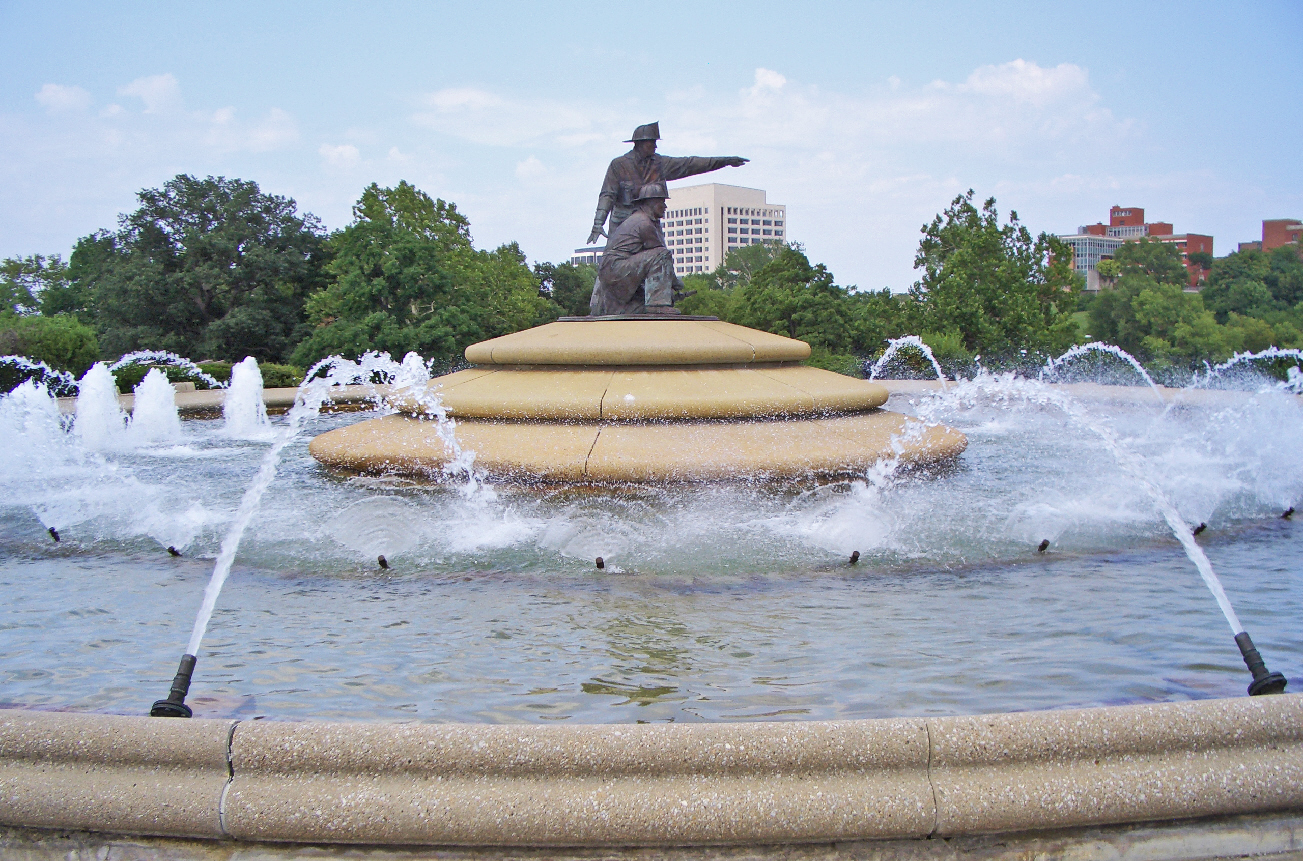
Firefighters' Fountain, W. 31st Street and Broadway

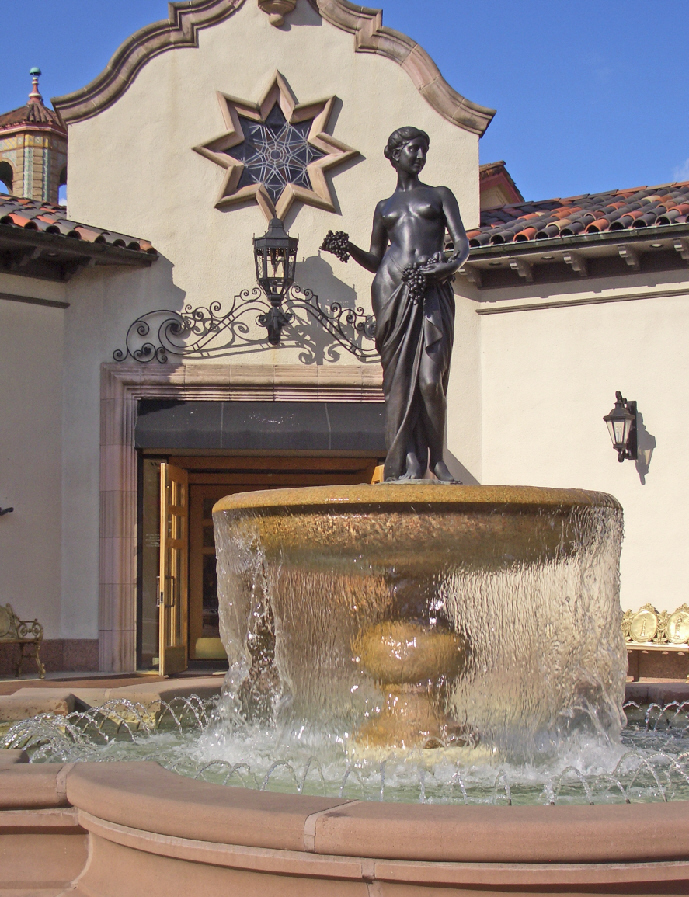
Pomona, fountain sculpture by Donatello Gabbrielli, at Ward Parkway & Broadway, in the Plaza

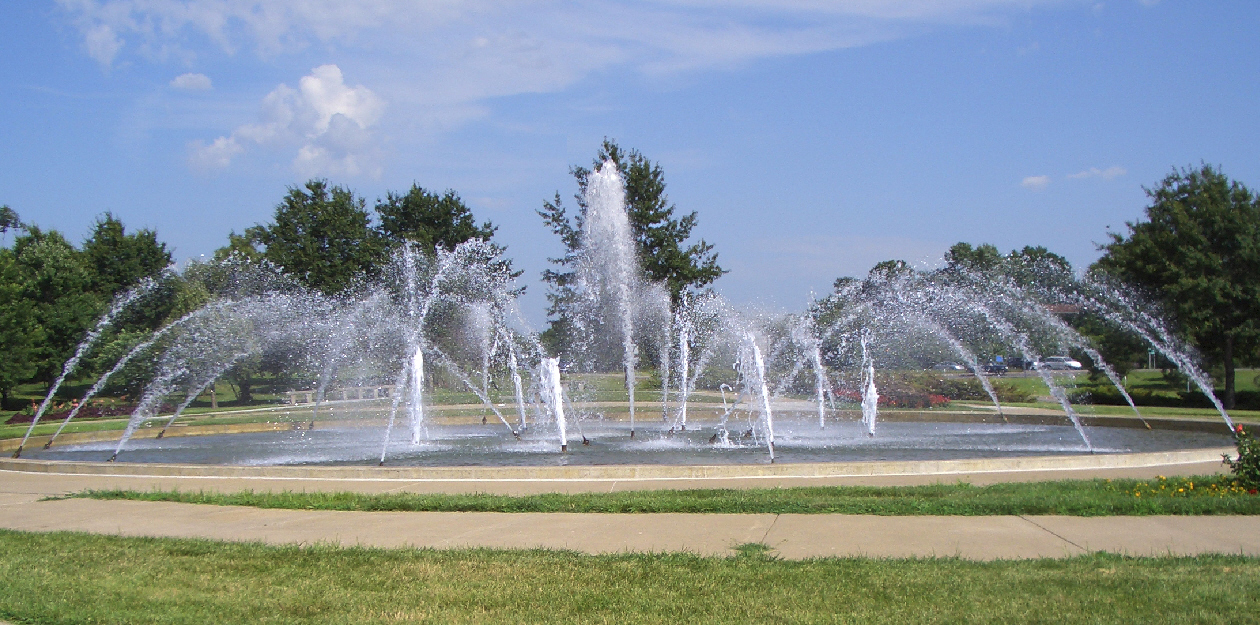
Northland Fountain, at Oak Trafficway & Vivion Road

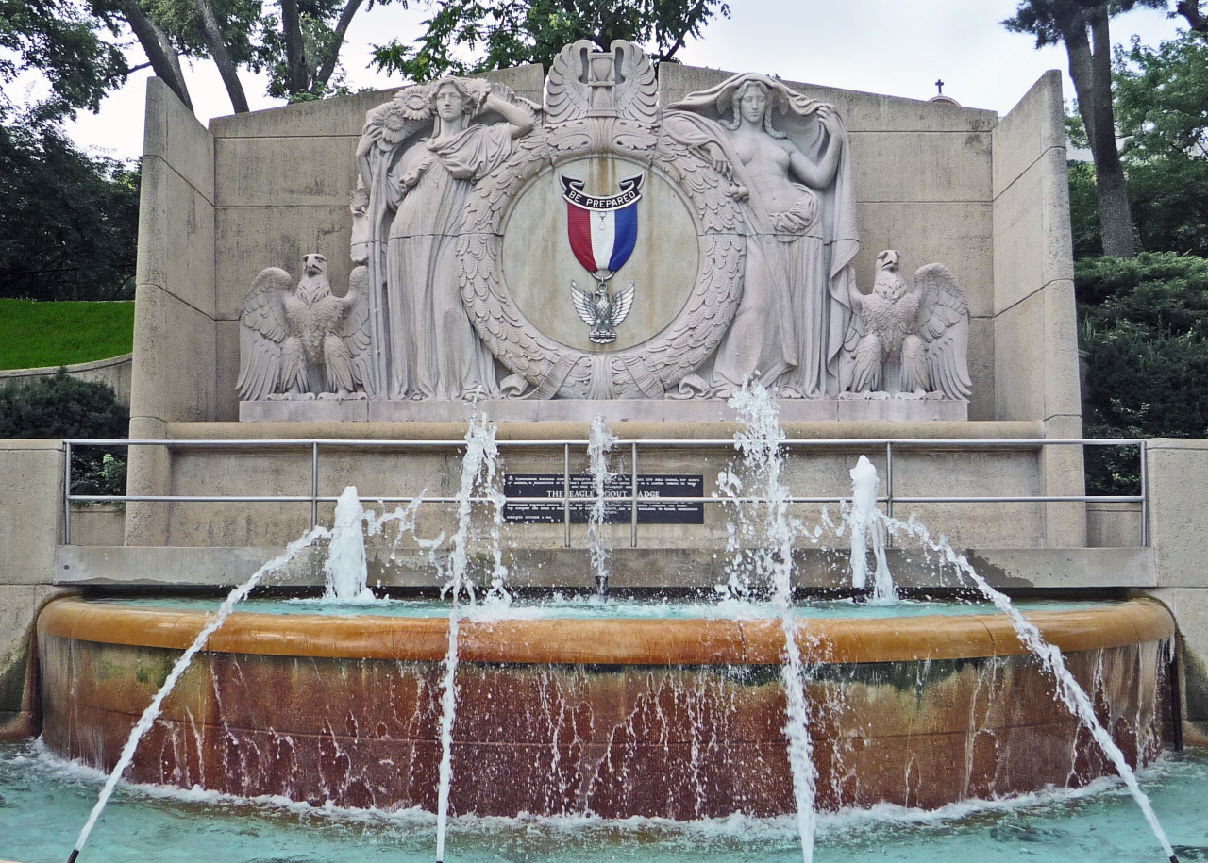
Eagle Scout Memorial Fountain, E. 39th Street at Gillham Road

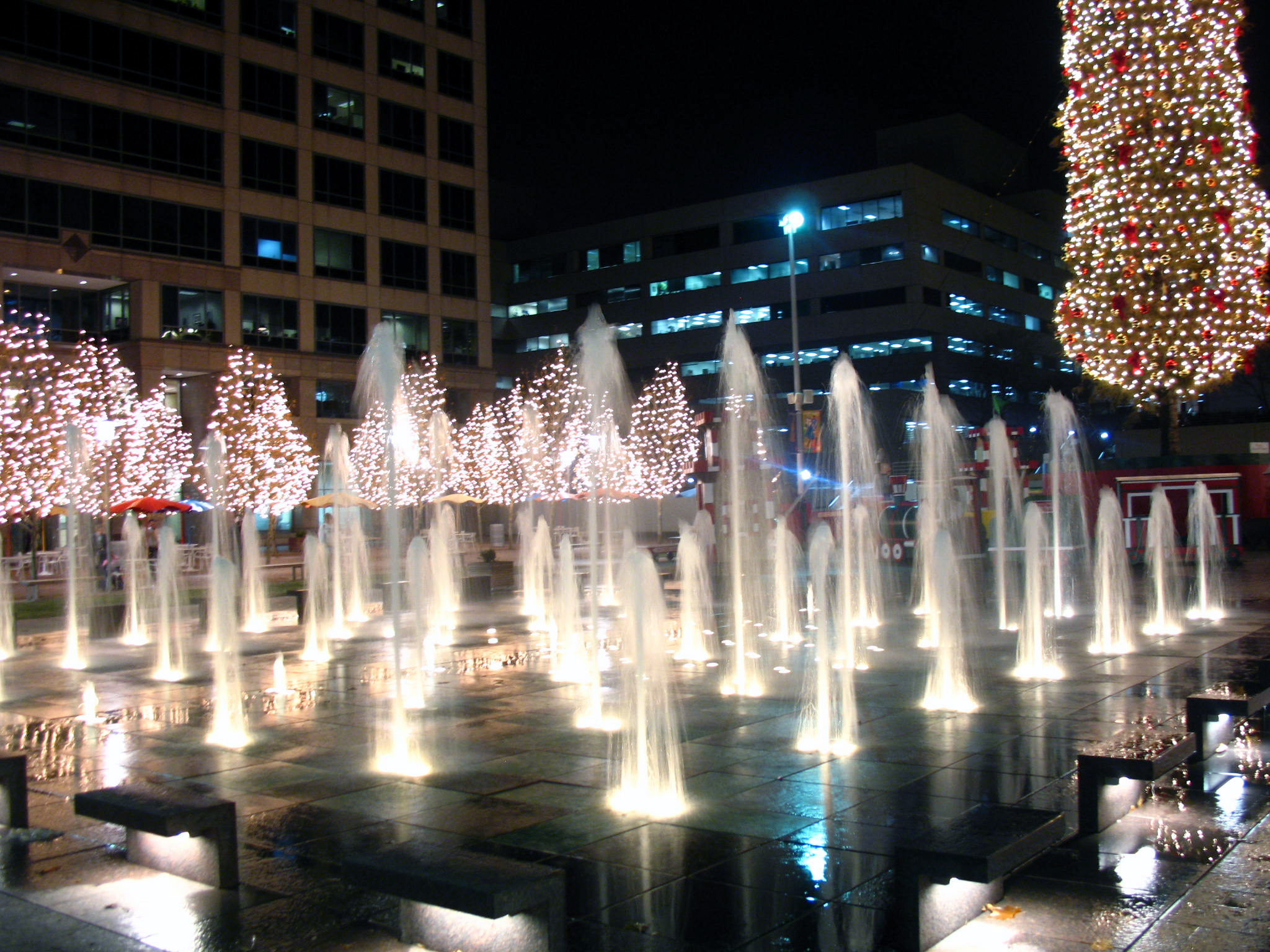
Crown Center Square Fountain at Crown Center, Grand Avenue & E. Pershing during the holidays

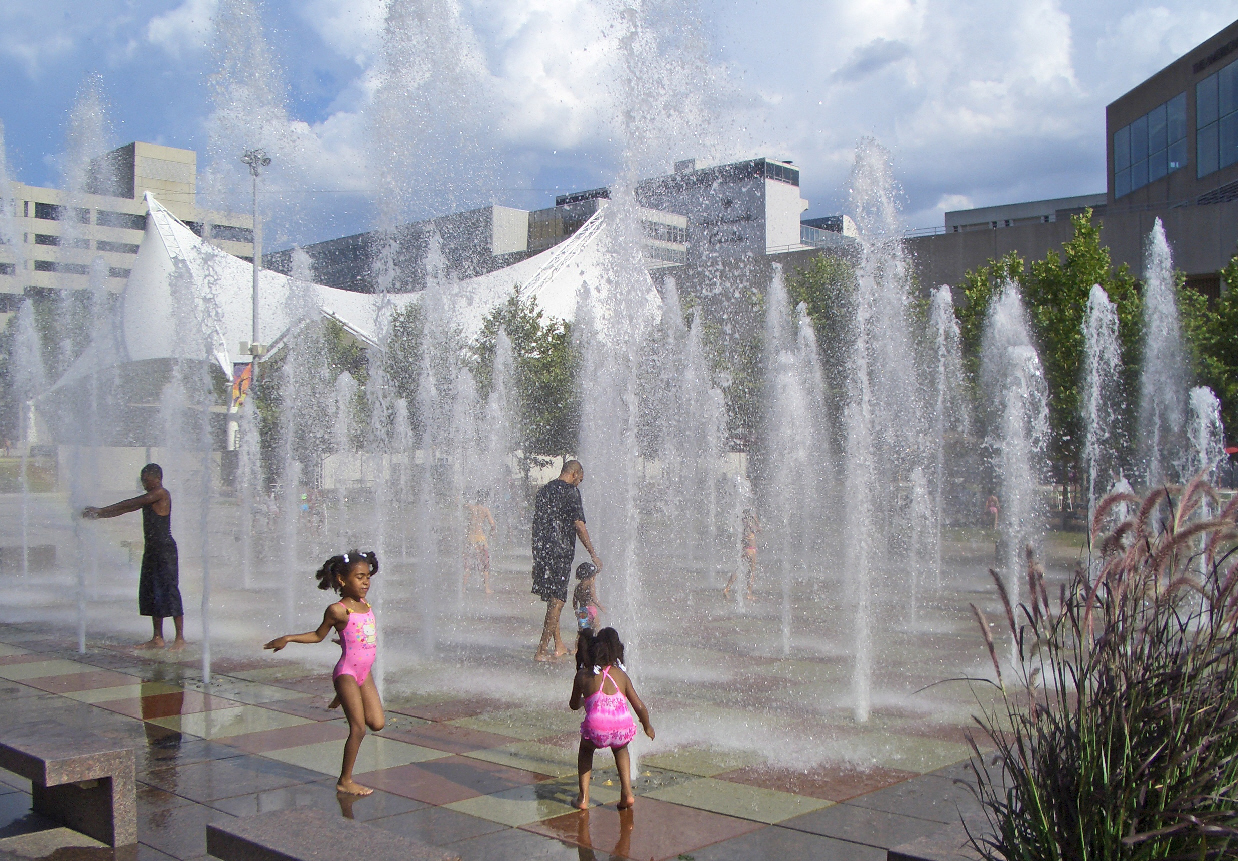
Crown Center Square Fountain. "Dancing Waters" shows with synchronized 60-foot-high (18 m) jets of water run every hour all day on weekends, and at noon and evening hours on weekdays.

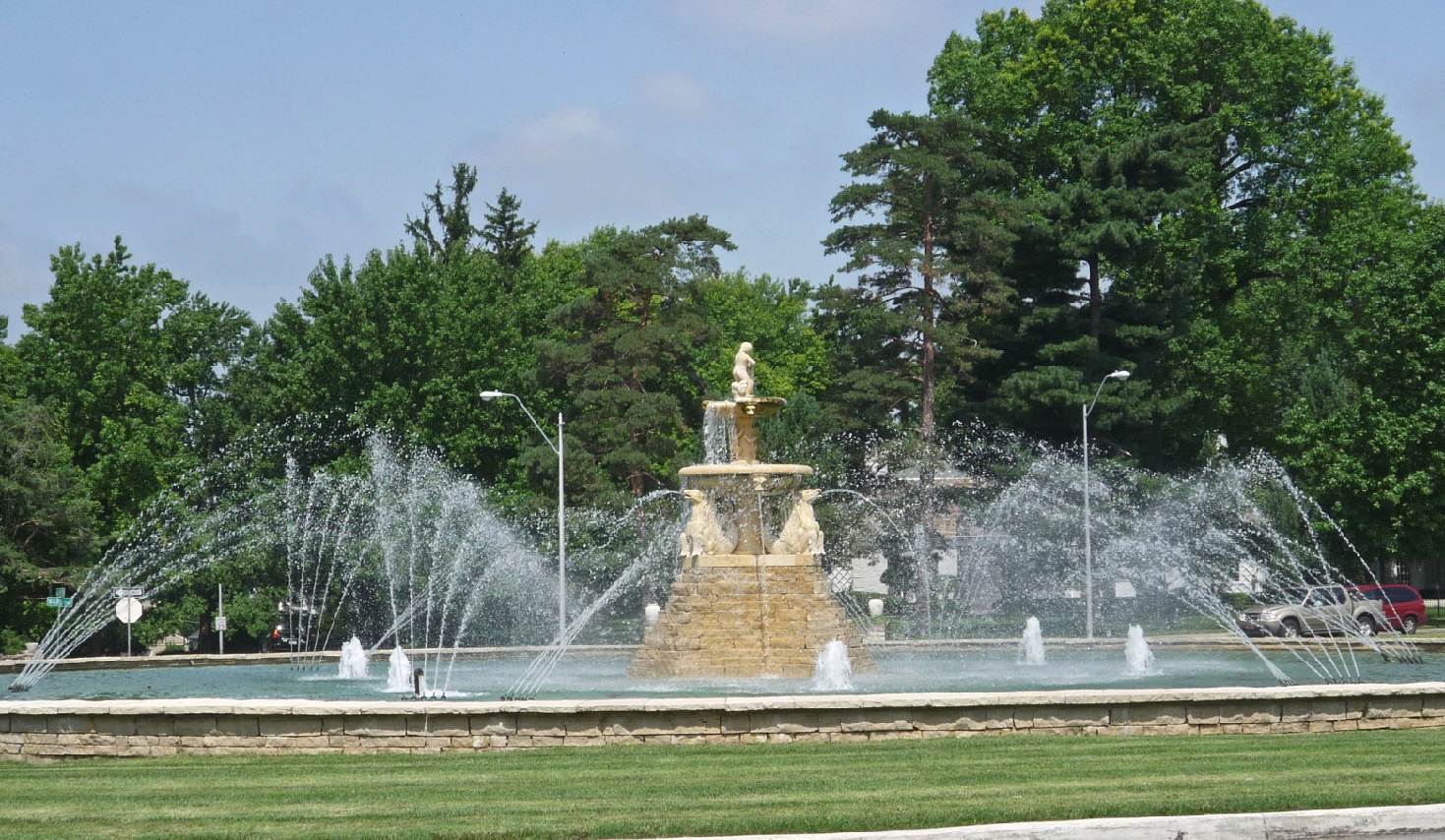
Meyer Circle ("Seahorse") Fountain, at Meyer Boulevard & Ward Parkway. The fountain hosts a 17th-century Venetian sculpture.

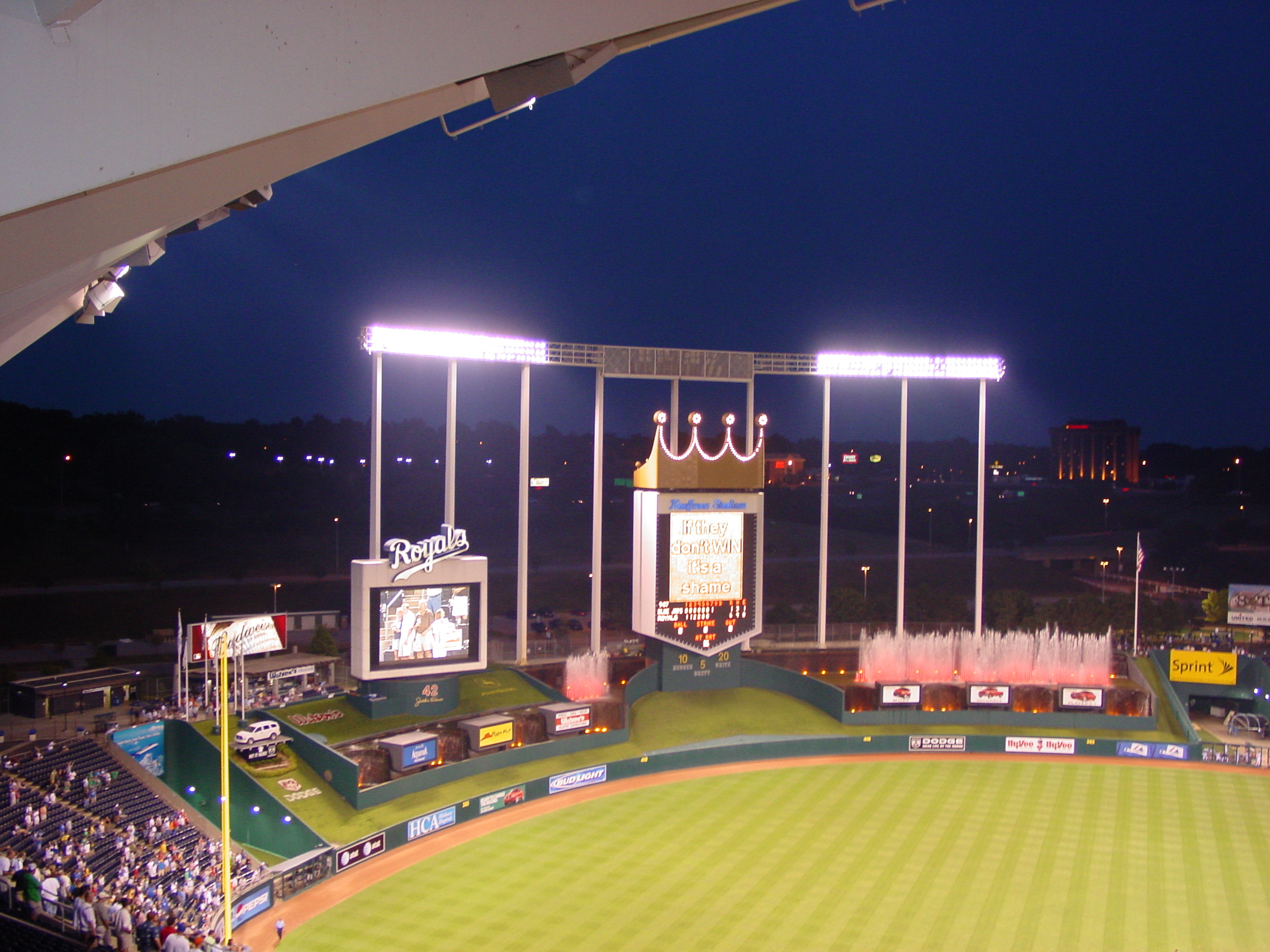
Waterworks Spectacular, at Kauffman Stadium

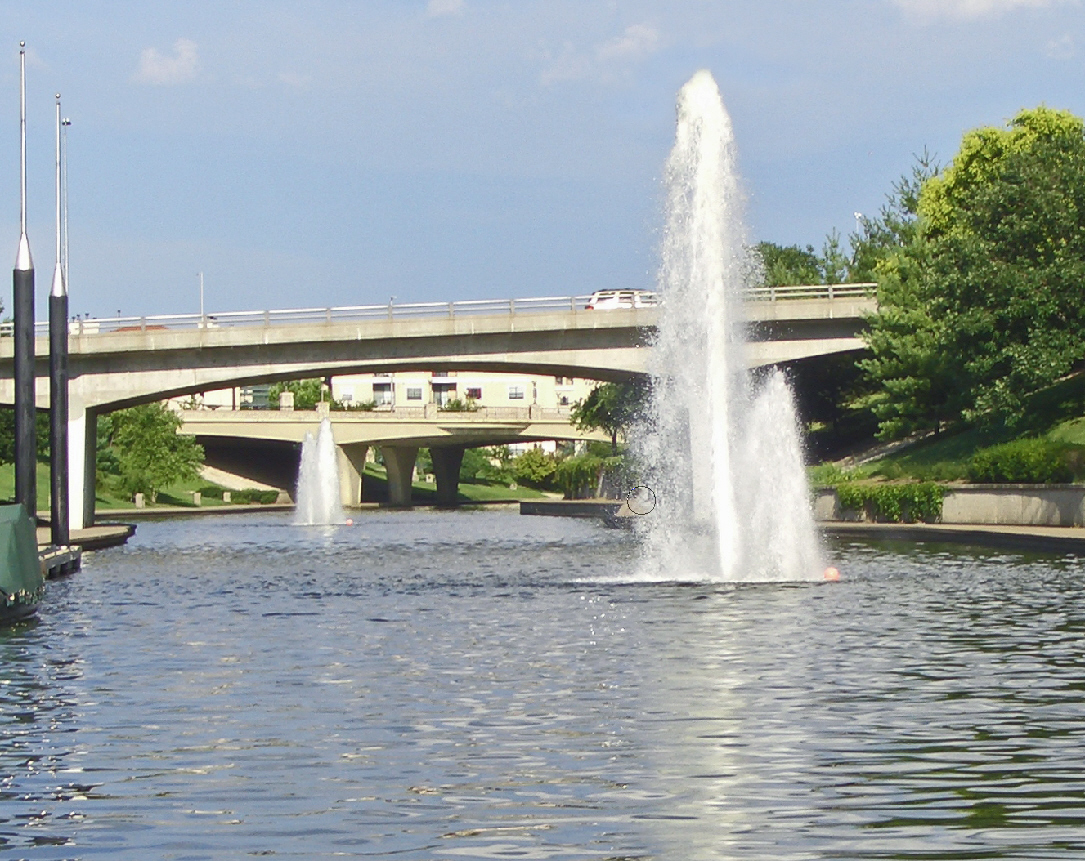
Fountains in Brush Creek, along Ward Parkway, in the Plaza

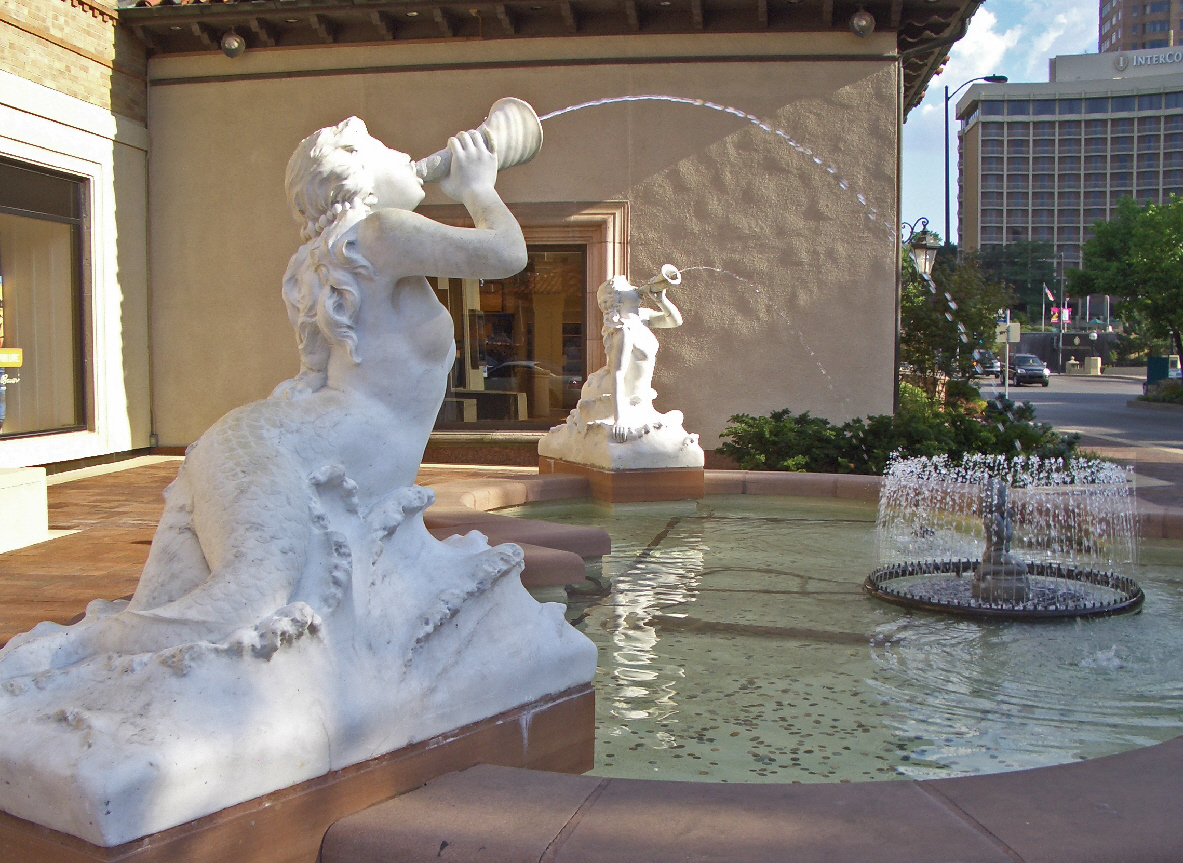
Mermaid Fountain, at Nichols Road & Broadway, in the Plaza

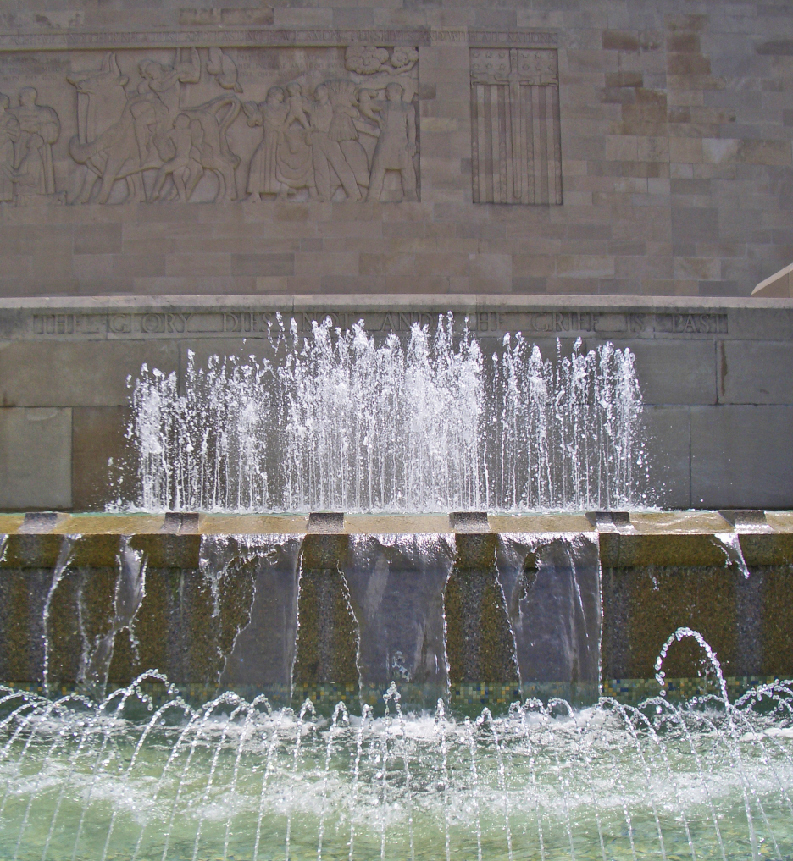
A fountain at Liberty Memorial

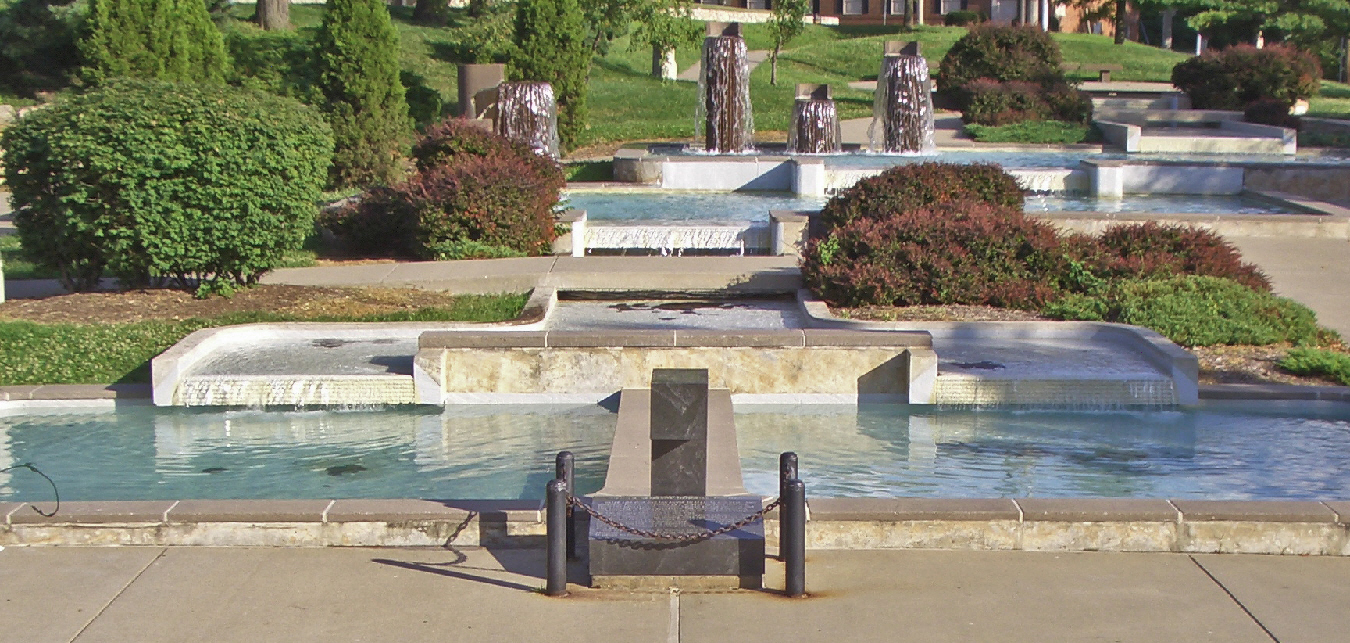
Kansas City Vietnam Veterans Memorial Fountain, at Broadway & W. 41st Street, in Westport

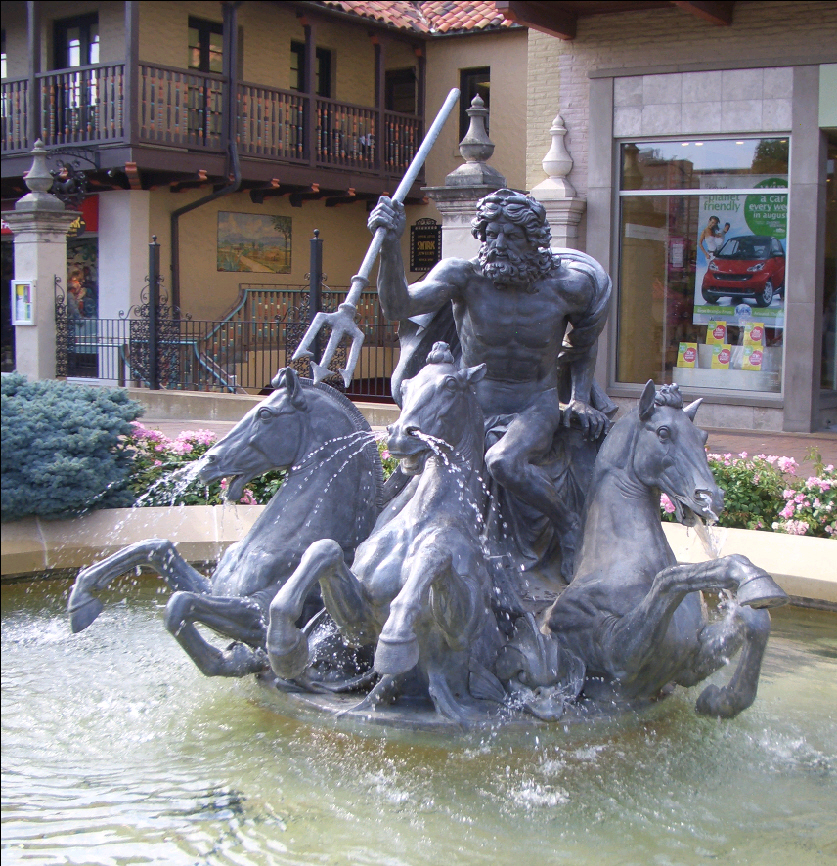
Neptune Fountain, W. 47th Street & Wornall Road, in the Plaza

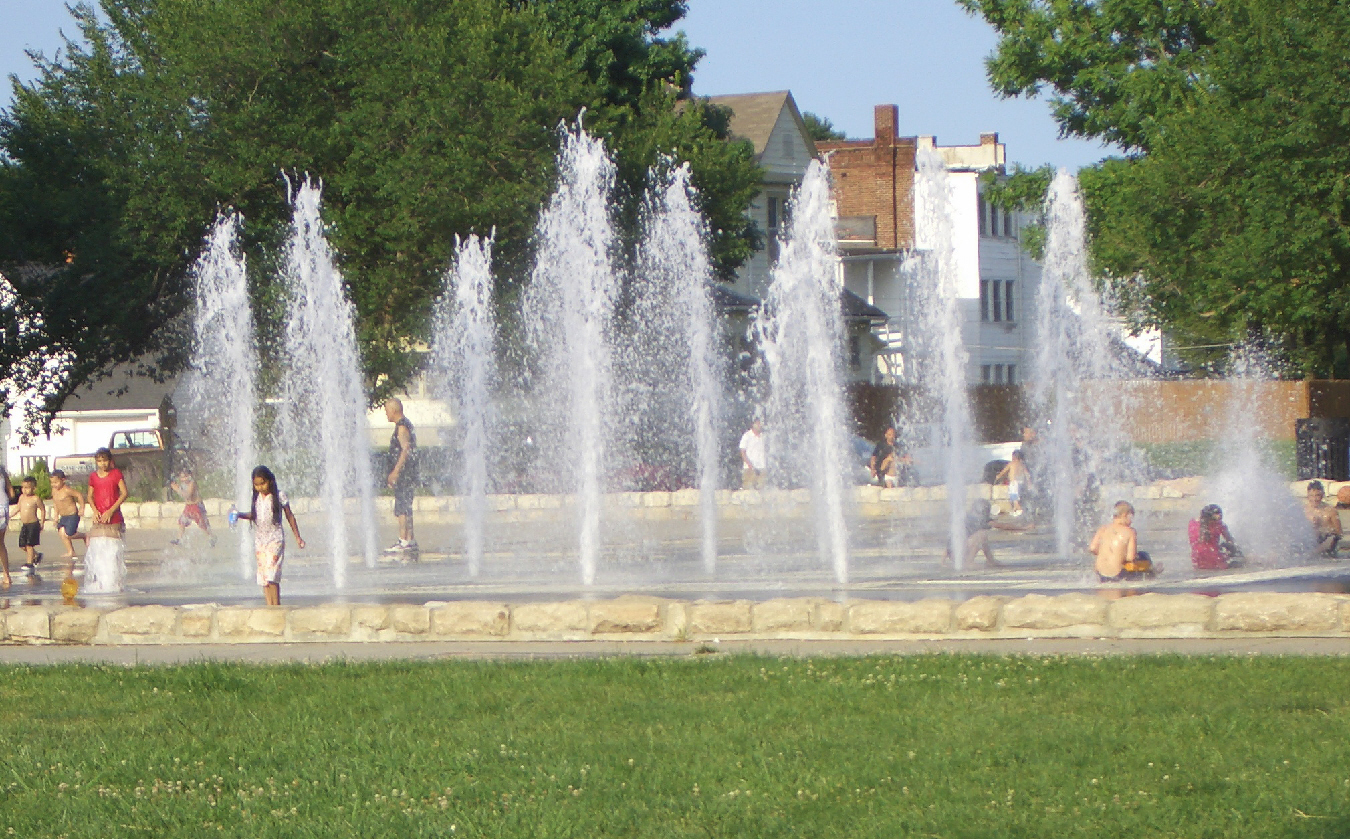
Northeast Concourse Fountain, on St. John Avenue between Gladstone and Benton Boulevards

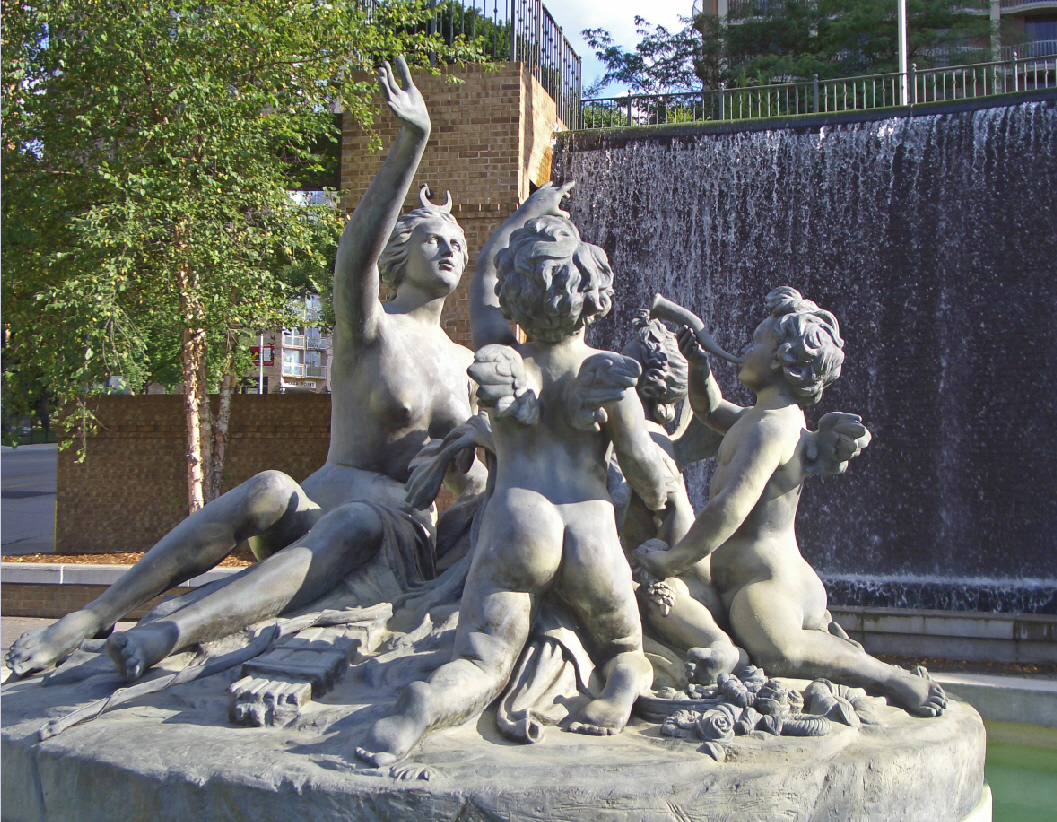
Diana (and Cherubs), fountain sculpture, at Ward Parkway & Wornall Road, in the Plaza

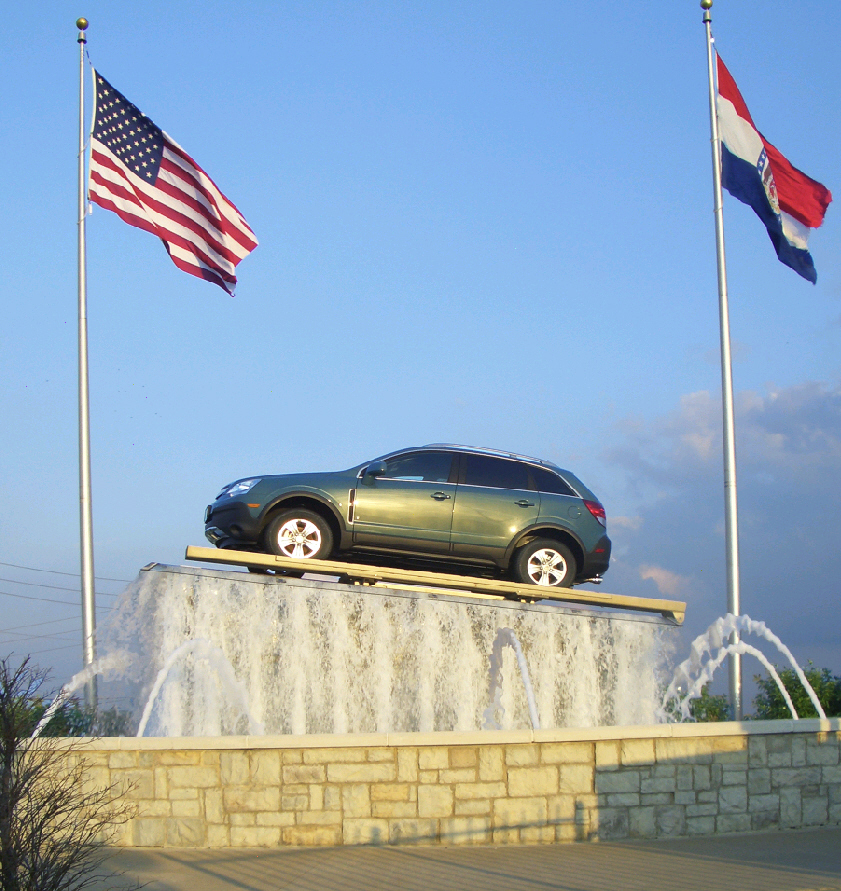
Auto dealership "car fountain", on NW Prairie View Drive, at I-29

The list of fountains in the Kansas City metropolitan area contains those now officially recognized by the City of Fountains Foundation. The trend began in the late 1800s with humanitarian public drinking water projects in Kansas City, Missouri, and this identity has influenced fountains across the Kansas City metropolitan area. In 1992, the city of Kansas City, Missouri added "City of Fountains" to its official corporate seal.

== Overview ==
Water fountains are part of Kansas City's core identity and culture, including a graphic design of a stylized fountain in the city's official logo. Interest in fountains arose during the City Beautiful movement in the 1890s. In 1898, George Kessler, a landscape architect and urban planner, designed the first fountain built by the city of Kansas City, Missouri at 15th and the Paseo. Another fountain that he designed the same year is now known as The Women's Leadership Fountain, and is located at 9th Street and the Paseo as the oldest in the city. The design originally included an oval, cut limestone basin with water spraying upward from nozzles in the center of its pool surrounded by a raised sidewalk, a flower garden, gas lamps, and a balustrade above to the south. The fountain was destroyed in 1941 and rebuilt in 1970 and 1990, and began its third major restoration in January 2008 planned for completion in 2009. Kessler went on to include numerous plans for fountains in his urban designs of the park and boulevard system.

Typically, most of the first fountains in Kansas City served practical rather than decorative purposes. In 1904, the Humane Society of Kansas City in Kansas – established to prevent cruelty to women, children and animals – built a characteristic fountain near the west end of Minnesota Avenue at North 3rd Street. Water poured out of spigots in lions' mouths so that people could get clean water in their cups. This water fell into a granite basin at a height for horses to drink. The overflow from the basin went into four small pools at street level for dogs to drink. A street light was on top; in 1967, the fountain was given to the Wyandotte County Museum. The Humane Society went on to mount more than 100 fountains, including ones made of bronze created for people alone for sanitary purposes.

Fountain building and the use of decorative statuary exploded in the 1920s after developer J.C. Nichols used them extensively in the development of Country Club Plaza. The most famous fountain in Kansas City is the Mill Creek Fountain. The figures were originally created by French sculptor Henri-Léon Gréber in 1910 for "Harbor Hill", the estate of Clarence Mackay in Roslyn, New York. The four allegorical equestrian figures reportedly represent four great rivers of the world — the Mississippi River, Volga River, Seine River, and Rhine River. The work is enlivened by sculptures of little children riding dolphins in the pool surrounding the main figures.

The William Volker Memorial Fountain includes the last sculptures by Swedish artist Carl Milles. The five-piece ensemble of bronze statuary shows Saint Martin of Tours, patron saint of France, on horseback, giving his clothes to a beggar surrounded by two angels (one absurdly wearing a wristwatch) and a curious little demon in hiding. The sculptures rest between two pools of water with jet sprays along Volker Boulevard, and sits above a dramatic three-tier, 28 ft (8.5 m) waterfall into a basin on Brush Creek.

The Eagle Scout Memorial Fountain was originally part of the Seventh Avenue clock created by A.A. Weinman for the Pennsylvania Station in New York City. When the station was torn down, Kansas City petitioned to obtain the clock sculpture and replaced its face with an Eagle Scout tribute.

The Waterworks Spectacular has been dousing the outfield during baseball games at Kauffman Stadium for more than 30 years.

=== 0–9 ===
- 49/63 Neighborhood Fountain
- 5901 College Boulevard
- 7007 College Boulevard
- 7101 Tower

=== A–B ===
- Adam and Eve at Jacob L. Loose Park
- Adams Dairy Parkway Fountain
- Aleman Court Fountain
- Alfred Benjamin Memorial Fountain
- Allen Memorial Fountain
- American Legion Fountain at Budd Park
- American Legion Fountain at Swope Park
- American War Mothers Memorial Fountain
- Ameristar
- Antioch Park
- Armour Center Fountain
- Armour Green Fountain
- Bannister Mall Fountain (closed)
- Barnes Memorial Fountain
- Barney Allis Plaza Fountain
- Belinder Court Fountain
- Bernard Powell Memorial Fountain
- Boy and Frog Fountain
- Boy with Frog
- Brookwood Fountain
- Bronze Boar Fountain
- Brush Creek Fountains

=== C–E ===
- Carl J. DiCapo Fountain
- CarMax
- Children at Play Wall Fountain
- Children's Fountain
- City of Westwood Hills
- Clock Tower Plaza Fountain
- Colonial Court
- Commerce Bank
- Commerce Bank - Country Club Plaza
- Commerce Tower Sunken Garden Fountain
- Court of Lions Fountains
- Court of Lions Fountain II
- Court of Lions Fountain III
- Court of the Penguins Fountain
- Crown Center
- Crown Center Entrance Fountains
- D. W. Newcomers Sons Funeral Home Fountains
- Delbert J. Haff Fountains, sculpture by Jorgen Dreyer
- Diana
- Diane: Sitting
- Double Monopole
- E. F. Pierson Sculpture Garden Fountain
- Eagle Scout Memorial Fountain
- Eighth Street Fountain I
- Eighth Street Fountain II
- Embassy Suites Atrium Fountain
- Epperson House Wall Fountain
- Eubank Memorial Fountain
- Ewing & Muriel Kauffman Memorial Fountain

=== F–K ===
- Federal Building
- Firefighters Fountain
- Fountain of Bacchus
- The Fountains Luxury Retail Center
- Four Fauns Fountain
- Frank S. Land Memorial Fountain
- Grandview City Hall Veterans Memorial
- H & R Bloch Courtyard Fountain
- Hallmark Corporate Entrance
- Harold D. Rice Fountain
- Harry Evans Minty Memorial Fountain
- Harvester KC
- Helen Cuddy Memorial Rose Garden Fountain
- Helen Spradling Boylan Memorial
- Henry Wollman Bloch Memorial Fountain
- Hillside Fountain
- Hyatt Regency Crown Center
- Ilus Davis Civic Mall Fountain
- Jay Wolfe Memorial
- Jefferson Pointe Apartments
- Joe Dennis Park
- John Knox Fountain
- Kansas City Board of Trade Fountain
- Kansas City Life 100-year Commemorative Plaza
- Kansas City Star Fountain
- Kansas City University Fountains
- Kingswood Manor Fountain

=== L–O ===
- Leawood City Hall Courtyard Fountain
- Lenexa City Hall Fountain
- Liberty Courtyard Fountain
- Liberty Memorial Fountain
- Lighton Plaza I
- Lighton Plaza II
- Loose Park Lake
- Loose Park Rose Garden Fountain
- Marlborough Plaza
- Marriott Kansas City Downtown
- Marriott Residence Inn
- Martha & Jack Steadman Fountain
- Mary A. Fraser Memorial Fountain
- The Meadows
- Mermaid Fountain
- Meyer Circle Sea Horse Fountain
- Mill Creek Park Fountain
- A Mind Soothed at The Nelson-Atkins Museum of Art
- Mission Hills City Hall
- Molamphy Memorial
- Muse of the Missouri
- Nebraska Furniture Mart II
- Nebraska Furniture Mart III
- Neptune Fountain
- Newport Apartment Fountain
- Northeast Concourse
- Northland Fountain
- One Sun/34 Moons

=== P–S ===
- Parkville Spirit Fountain
- Parkway Towers fountain
- Penn Tower Building Atrium Fountain
- Pomona Fountain
- Prairie Village Gateway
- Pratt Memorial Fountain, Dagg Park
- Prospect Plaza Fountain
- Providence Medical Center Fountain
- Quenching Cup
- R.R. Osborne Plaza
- Renner Boulevard Fountains (4)
- Robert H. Gillham Fountain
- Rockhurst
- Romanelli Gardens Fountain
- Romany Fountain
- Russell Stover Fountain
- Scottish Rite Temple
- Sea Horse Fountain at City Hall
- Seville Light Fountain
- Shawnee Mission Pkwy
- Shirley Bush Helzberg Garden of the Stars
- Silverbrooke Community Waterfall
- Sixty-Ninth St. Fountain
- South Garden Reflecting Pool and Patio
- Spirit of Freedom Fountain
- Station Park Plaza
- Stowers Gift of Life Fountain
- Stratford Garden Park Fountain
- Swan Fountain

=== T–Z ===
- Thomas H. Swope Memorial Fountain
- Thousand Oaks fountain/sculpture
- Three Lakes Apartments
- Tomahawk Fountain
- Veterans of Foreign Wars Centennial Plaza
- Vietnam Veterans Fountain
- Ward Parkway Mirror Pool Fountain
- Water Spectacular
- Waterfall, Park University
- Westin Crown Center Hotel Lobby Fountain
- Westside Fountain
- Westwood, Kansas
- Wm.T. & Charlotte Kemper Memorial
- William T. Fitzsimons Memorial
- William Volker Memorial
- Willow Lake
- Women's Leadership
- Wornall Road & 67th Street Fountain
