= List of public art in North Ayrshire =

Map of Scotland with the North Ayrshire council area highlighted

This is a list of public art in North Ayrshire, one of the 32 local government council areas of Scotland. This list applies only to works of public art on permanent display in an outdoor public space and does not, for example, include artworks in museums.

== Ardrossan ==
Image	Title / subject	Location and coordinates	Date	Artist / designer	Type	Material	Dimensions	Designation	Wikidata	Notes
	War memorial	Ardrossan	1923	James A Young	Celtic Cross	Stone				Architects: Dr Macgregor Chalmers & J Jeffrey Waddell

== Beith ==
Image	Title / subject	Location and coordinates	Date	Artist / designer	Type	Material	Dimensions	Designation	Wikidata	Notes
More images	War memorial	Beith	1919, resited 1947	Robert McLachlan	Pillar cross on pedestal	Stone		Category C	Q77780447	

== Fairlie ==
Image	Title / subject	Location and coordinates	Date	Artist / designer	Type	Material	Dimensions	Designation	Wikidata	Notes
	War memorial	Fairlie, North Ayrshire	1921		Celtic cross	Sandstone				

== Great Cumbrae ==
Image	Title / subject	Location and coordinates	Date	Artist / designer	Type	Material	Dimensions	Designation	Wikidata	Notes
More images	Monument	Tomont End, Great Cumbrae			Obelisk	Stone		Category B	Q56643423	Monument to two drowned sailors.
More images	War memorial	Millport, Great Cumbrae	1922	Robert Gray (builder)	Pillar on pedestal	Stone				

== Irvine ==
Image	Title / subject	Location and coordinates	Date	Artist / designer	Type	Material	Dimensions	Designation	Wikidata	Notes
More images	Robert Burns	Towns Moor, Irvine	1894	James Pittendrigh Macgillivray	Statue on pedestal with plaques	Bronze and granite		Category B	Q56643423	

== Isle of Arran ==
Image	Title / subject	Location and coordinates	Date	Artist / designer	Type	Material	Dimensions	Designation	Wikidata	Notes
	William Hamilton, 11th Duke of Hamilton	Brodick, Isle of Arran			Seated statue on pedestal	Bronze and granite		Category B	Q17830137	
More images	Rev. John Kennedy	Pirnmill, Isle of Arran	1910		Obelisk	Granite		Category B	Q17830577	
	War memorial	Shiskine, Isle of Arran	c. 1920		Pillar with low relief	Granite		Category C	Q56619578	Relief of crossed rifles.
	War memorial	Bennecarrigan, Sliddery, Isle of Arran	c. 1920		Obelisk with low relief	Granite		Category C	Q56620135	Gun and wreath relief.
	War memorial	Whiting Bay, Isle of Arran	c. 1920		Obelisk with relief	Granite		Category C	Q56616363	Gun and wreath relief.
	Seal	Corrie, Isle of Arran		Marvin Elliott	Statue on offshore rock	Bronze				

== Kilwinning ==
Image	Title / subject	Location and coordinates	Date	Artist / designer	Type	Material	Dimensions	Designation	Wikidata	Notes
More images	Saint Winning's Cross	Kilwinning			Mercat cross	Wooden cross and stone pillar		Category A	Q17571036	
	War memorial	Kilwinning Cemetery	1933	J & G Mossman (Builders)	Obelisk with roundel	Granite and bronze	6m tall			
More images	Robert W. Service memorial	Kilwinning			Structure with mosaics	Stone				

== Largs ==
Image	Title / subject	Location and coordinates	Date	Artist / designer	Type	Material	Dimensions	Designation	Wikidata	Notes
More images	War memorial	Largs	1921	William Kellock Brown	Sculpture group on pedestal with plaques	Stone with bronze plaques		Category C	Q56643423	
