= List of public art in Dundee =

This is a list of public art in Dundee, Scotland. This list applies only to works of public art on permanent display in an outdoor public space and does not, for example, include artworks in museums.

Image	Title / subject	Location and coordinates	Date	Artist / designer	Type	Material	Dimensions	Designation	Wikidata	Notes
More images	Mercat cross	Nethergate	1586	John Mylne	Unicorn statue on column & pedestal	Stone & bronze resin		Category B		Modern unicorn replacement by Scott Sutherland.
	Sir David Baxter, 1st Baronet	The Pavilion, Baxter Park	1863	John Steell	Statue	Marble				
	George Kinloch	Albert Square	1872	John Steell	Statue on pedestal	Bronze and granite		Category B	Q17798900	
	James Carmichael	Albert Square	1876	John Hutchison	Seated statue on pedestal	Bronze and granite		Category B		
More images	Statue of Robert Burns	Albert Square	1880	John Steell	Seated statue on pedestal	Bronze and granite		Category B	Q17798424	
More images	Queen Victoria	Albert Square	1899	Harry Bates	Seated statue on pedestal with reliefs	Bronze and granite		Category B	Q17798977	
	Police war memorial	Sheriff Court, West Bell Street	1922		Celtic wheel cross	Stone	2m tall		Q56630256	
More images	War memorial	Law Road, Dundee Law	1925	Thomas Braddock, William Gauldie (architect), R.Pert and Sons Ltd. (builder)	Monument with beacon	Granite		Category B	Q17808521	
More images	Black Watch memorial	Emmock Road, Dundee	1959	Scott Sutherland	Statue on pedestal & steps	Bronze and stone			Q17814233	
	Ceramic panels	40-42 Bellfield St.	1982-83	Keith Donnelly	Relief panels	Ceramic resin				
	Deer Leap	Riverside Avenue, Dundee Technology Park	1987	David Annand	Sculpture group	Bronze				
	Street Furniture / Lily buds & jute twists	Nethergate, High St., Murrygate & Panmure St.	1992-c.1996	David Findlay Wilson	Railings and street furniture	Metal				
	The Dragon	Murrygate	1992-1994	Alastair Smart, Tony Morrow & Powderhall Bronze	Statue	Bronze				
More images	Adam Duncan, 1st Viscount Duncan	High Street, Castlehill	1997	Janet Scrymgeour Wedderburn	Statue on pedestal	Bronze and granite				
More images	Desperate Dan & Dawg	High Street	2001	Susie Paterson, Tony Morrow & Powderhall Bronze	Sculpture group	Bronze				
	Minnie the Minx	High Street	2001	Susie Paterson, Tony Morrow & Powderhall Bronze	Sculpture	Bronze				
	March of the Penguins	Outside Steeple Church, Nethergate	2005	Angela Hunter	Sculpture group	Bronze				
	Catalyst	3 Greenmarket	2008	Matthew Dalziel & Louise Scullion	Sculpture	Various				
	Another Time X	Grounds of Maggie's Dundee at Ninewells Hospital	2008	Antony Gormley	Statue	Cast iron				
More images	Dundee International Submarine Memorial	Victoria Dock	2009	Paul Grime & Jeremy Cunningham	9 panels	Stone			Q5314825	
More images	Lemmings	Seabraes Gardens	2013	Alyson Conway & Powderhall Bronze	Sculpture group	Bronze			Q23900277	Sculpture representing 3 video game characters.
More images	Jute Women	High Street, Lochee	2014	Malcolm Robertson & Powderhall Bronze	Sculpture group and screen	Bronze and steel			Q134813221	Screen has verses by Mary Brooksbank & Ron Hutcheson.
