= National Register of Historic Places listings in Sevier County, Utah =

Location of Sevier County in Utah

This is a list of the National Register of Historic Places listings in Sevier County, Utah.

This is intended to be a complete list of the properties and districts on the National Register of Historic Places in Sevier County, Utah, United States. Latitude and longitude coordinates are provided for many National Register properties and districts; these locations may be seen together in a map.

Sevier County and Sanpete County make up the "Little Scandinavia" portion of Utah, where many of Utah's 20,000 Scandinavian immigrants during the 19th century settled. Pair-houses, a Scandinavian home form, are relatively more common here than elsewhere in Utah.

There are 24 properties and districts listed on the National Register in the county. Another 5 sites in the county were once listed, but have since been removed.

This National Park Service list is complete through NPS recent listings posted July 31, 2026.

== Current listings ==
	Name on the Register	Image	Date listed	Location	City or town	Description
1	Aspen-Cloud Rock Shelters		November 1, 1979 (#79002510)	Address Restricted, in Saleratus Canyon on Old Woman Plateau	Salina	Archaic rock shelters that include archaeological remains of the earliest houses found in Utah.
2	Elsinore Sugar Factory	Elsinore Sugar Factory	June 17, 1980 (#80003959)	East of Elsinore; 38°40′53″N 112°07′24″W	Elsinore	
3	Elsinore White Rock Schoolhouse	Elsinore White Rock Schoolhouse	January 18, 1978 (#78002692)	15 E. 200 North; 38°41′10″N 112°08′50″W	Elsinore	
4	Fish Lake Cut-off of the Old Spanish Trail Archeological District, Red Creek–Sheep Valley Segment		January 14, 2013 (#12001184)	Address Restricted, in Fishlake National Forest	Salina vicinity	Designated by archaeological site code 42SV2828, the cut-off was part of an important interstate trade route about 1832–1853.
5	Glenwood Cooperative Store	Glenwood Cooperative Store	April 29, 1980 (#80003960)	15 W. Center St. 38°45′47″N 111°59′23″W	Glenwood	
6	Gooseberry Valley Archeological District		September 4, 1980 (#80003968)	Address Restricted, southeast of Salina in Fishlake National Forest	Salina	Collection of archaeological sites left by the Fremont culture
7	Jens Larson Jenson Lime Kiln	Jens Larson Jenson Lime Kiln	December 22, 1978 (#78002693)	2 miles (3.2 km) north of Richfield; 38°47′36″N 112°05′08″W	Richfield	
8	Martin Johnson House	Martin Johnson House	October 20, 1982 (#82001757)	45 W. 400 South; 38°45′27″N 111°59′25″W	Glenwood	
9	Monroe City Hall	Monroe City Hall	April 1, 1985 (#85000814)	55 N. Main St. 38°37′58″N 112°07′18″W	Monroe	Spanish Colonial Revival building built in 1934, now the Monroe Public Library building.
10	Monroe Presbyterian Church	Monroe Presbyterian Church	March 27, 1980 (#80003963)	20 W. 100 North; 38°38′02″N 112°07′16″W	Monroe	
11	Old Spanish Trail Archeological District, Ivie Creek–Emigrant Pass Segment		January 14, 2013 (#12001185)	Address Restricted, in Fishlake National Forest	Salina vicinity	
12	Joseph William Parker Farm	Joseph William Parker Farm	March 25, 1977 (#77001318)	2.5 miles (4.0 km) northeast of Joseph; 38°39′18″N 112°11′39″W	Joseph	
13	Peterson-Burr House	Peterson-Burr House	February 18, 1994 (#94000037)	190 W. Main; 38°57′28″N 111°51′43″W	Salina	
14	Redmond Hotel	Redmond Hotel	June 20, 1980 (#80003964)	15 E. Main St. 39°00′22″N 111°51′48″W	Redmond	
15	Redmond Town Hall	Redmond Town Hall	September 13, 1976 (#76001836)	18 W. Main St. 39°00′22″N 111°51′50″W	Redmond	
16	Richfield Carnegie Library	Richfield Carnegie Library	October 25, 1984 (#84000153)	83 E. Center St. 38°46′06″N 112°04′57″W	Richfield	
17	Salina Municipal Building and Library	Salina Municipal Building and Library	April 9, 1986 (#86000742)	90 W. Main; 38°57′28″N 111°51′38″W	Salina	
18	Salina Presbyterian Church	Salina Presbyterian Church	March 27, 1980 (#80003967)	204 S. 1st East; 38°57′17″N 111°51′27″W	Salina	
19	Sevier Ward Church	Sevier Ward Church	June 24, 1980 (#80003969)	East of Sevier along U.S. Route 89; 38°35′43″N 112°14′58″W	Sevier	
20	Soren Simonsen House	Soren Simonsen House	October 20, 1982 (#82001758)	55 W. 200 North; 38°38′06″N 112°07′19″W	Monroe	
21	Sudden Shelter (42SV6)		January 4, 1989 (#88003009)	Address Restricted	Salina	A cave that has yielded projectile points from a range of archaeological periods
22	US Post Office-Richfield Main	US Post Office-Richfield Main	November 27, 1989 (#89001999)	93 N. Main; 38°46′09″N 112°05′04″W	Richfield	
23	Joseph Wall Gristmill	Joseph Wall Gristmill	June 20, 1980 (#80003961)	355 S. 250 East; 38°45′30″N 111°59′05″W	Glenwood	
24	Young Block	Young Block	June 24, 1980 (#80003965)	3-17 S. Main St. 38°46′04″N 112°05′01″W	Richfield	

== Former listings ==
	Name on the Register	Image	Date listed	Date removed	Location	City or town	Description
1	Monroe Methodist Episcopal Church		May 23, 1980 (#80003962)	September 3, 2009	55 W 100 West	Monroe	Torn down in 1996. Portions relocated to Thanksgiving Point in Lehi.
2	Ralph Ramsay House		July 8, 1975 (#75001824)	September 3, 2009	57 E. 200 North; 38°46′16″N 112°04′59″W	Richfield	Demolished in January 2008
3	Richfield Tithing Office		January 25, 1985 (#85000284)	March 8, 1988	190 W. Center St.	Richfield	
4	Old Sevier County Courthouse		May 30, 1975 (#75002136)	November 29, 1976	Main St. between 200 and 300 North	Richfield	Demolished in November and December, 1975.
5	Salina Hospital	Salina Hospital	June 19, 1980 (#80003966)	August 15, 2023	330 W. Main St. 38°57′28″N 111°51′54″W	Salina	

== See also ==
- List of National Historic Landmarks in Utah
- National Register of Historic Places listings in Utah
