= Glen H. Turner =

American artist (1918–1993)

- Born: March 11, 1918; Monroe, Utah, U.S.
- Died: December 1, 1993 (aged 75)
- Occupations: Educator, painter, photographer

Glen H. Turner (March 11, 1918 – December 1, 1993) was an American educator, photographer, and painter. He was an art professor at Brigham Young University.
