= Monroe City Hall =

Monroe City Hall may refer to:

- Monroe City Hall (Monroe, Georgia), listed on the National Register of Historic Places (NRHP)in Walton County
- Monroe City Hall (Monroe, North Carolina), NRHP-listed in Union County
- Monroe City Hall (Monroe, Utah), NRHP-listed in Sevier County
