= Martin Johnson House =

- U.S. National Register of Historic Places
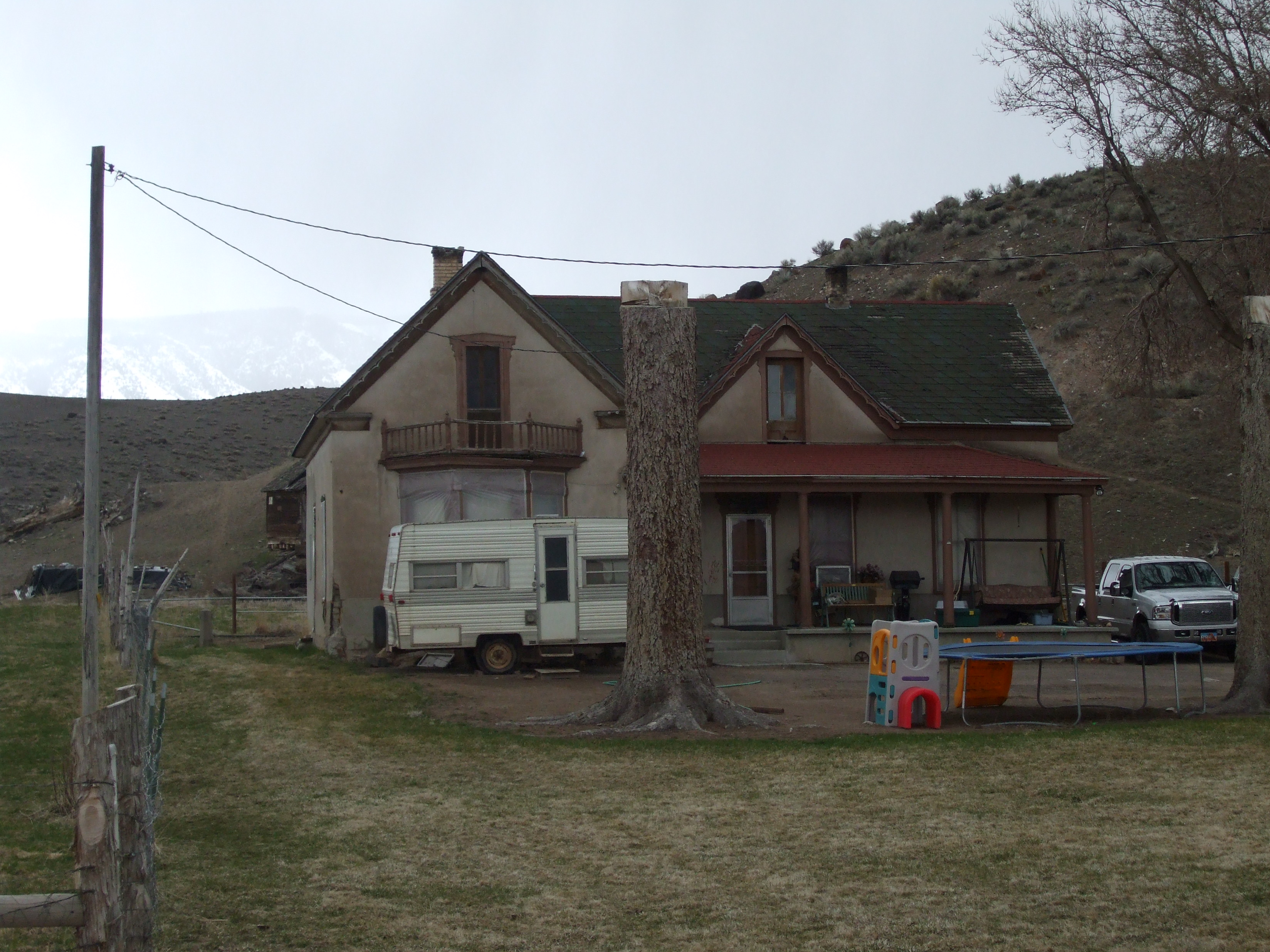

- Location within Utah Location within the United States
- Location: 45 W. 400 South, Glenwood, Utah
- Coordinates: 38°45′27″N 111°59′25″W
- Area: 4.1 acres (1.7 ha)
- Built: c.1880
- Architectural style: Late Gothic Revival
- MPS: Scandinavian-American Pair-houses TR
- NRHP reference No.: 82001757
- Added to NRHP: October 20, 1982

The Martin Johnson House, at 45 W. 400 South in Glenwood, Utah, was built in c.1880. It was listed on the National Register of Historic Places in 1982.

Martin Johnson was born in Denmark in 1861, came to Utah with his parents in 1866, and probably built this house in preparation for his marriage; he was married in 1884.

The house is a one-and-a-half-story adobe structure laid out in a modified pair-house plan. It has Gothic Revival-style cross gable above the main entrance, though not symmetrically placed. It has decorative details including Doric columns on its porch and scroll-cut bargeboards.
