= Monroe Presbyterian Church =

Historic church in Utah, United States

- U.S. National Register of Historic Places
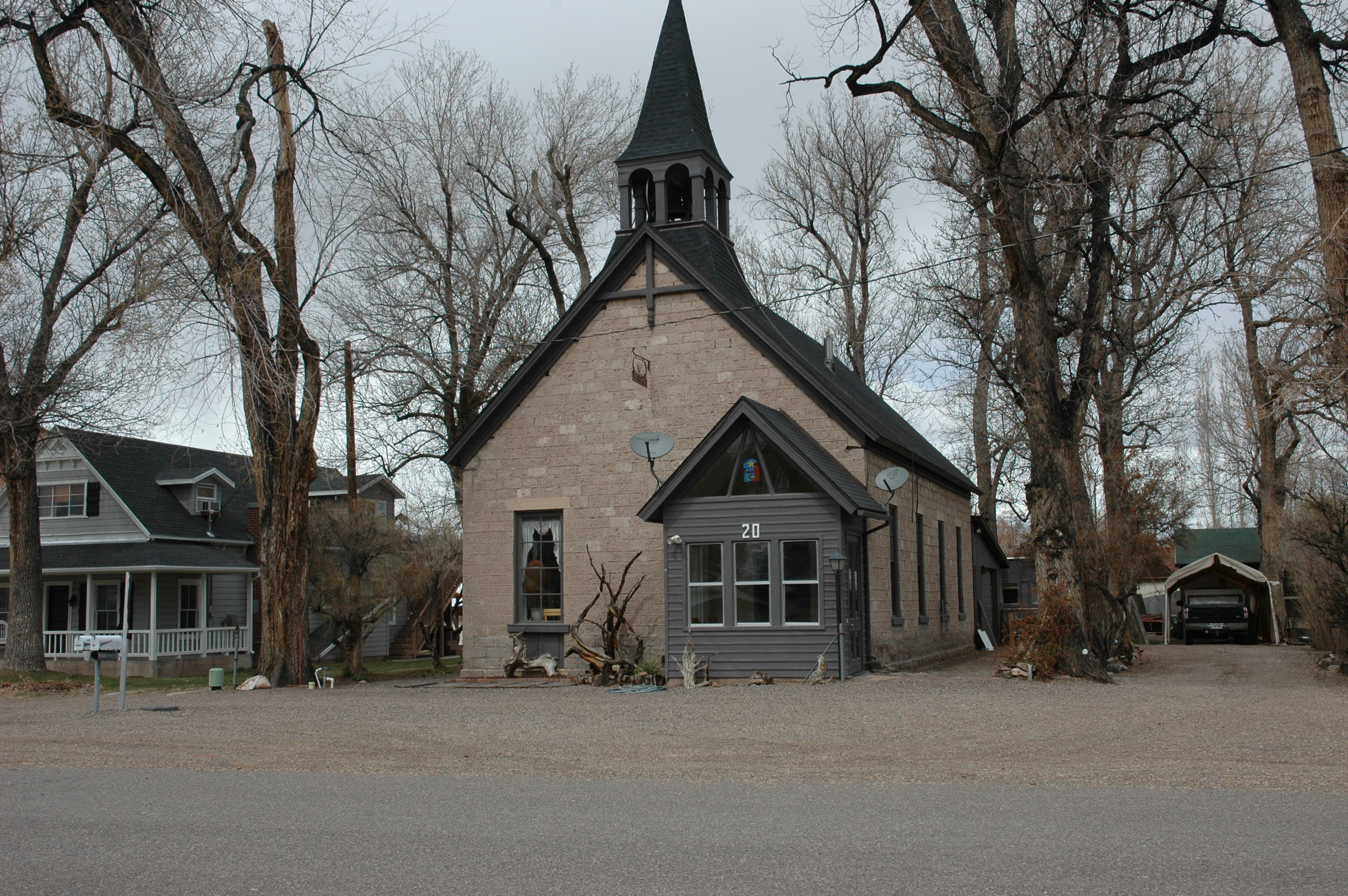

- Location within Utah Location within the United States
- Location: 20 E. 100 North, Monroe, Utah
- Coordinates: 38°38′2″N 112°7′16″W
- Area: less than one acre
- Built: 1884
- NRHP reference No.: 80003963
- Added to NRHP: March 27, 1980

Monroe Presbyterian Church is a historic Presbyterian church at 20 E. 100 North in Monroe, Utah, United States.

It was started in 1884. It was added to the National Register of Historic Places in 1980.
