= Glenwood Cooperative Store =

- U.S. National Register of Historic Places
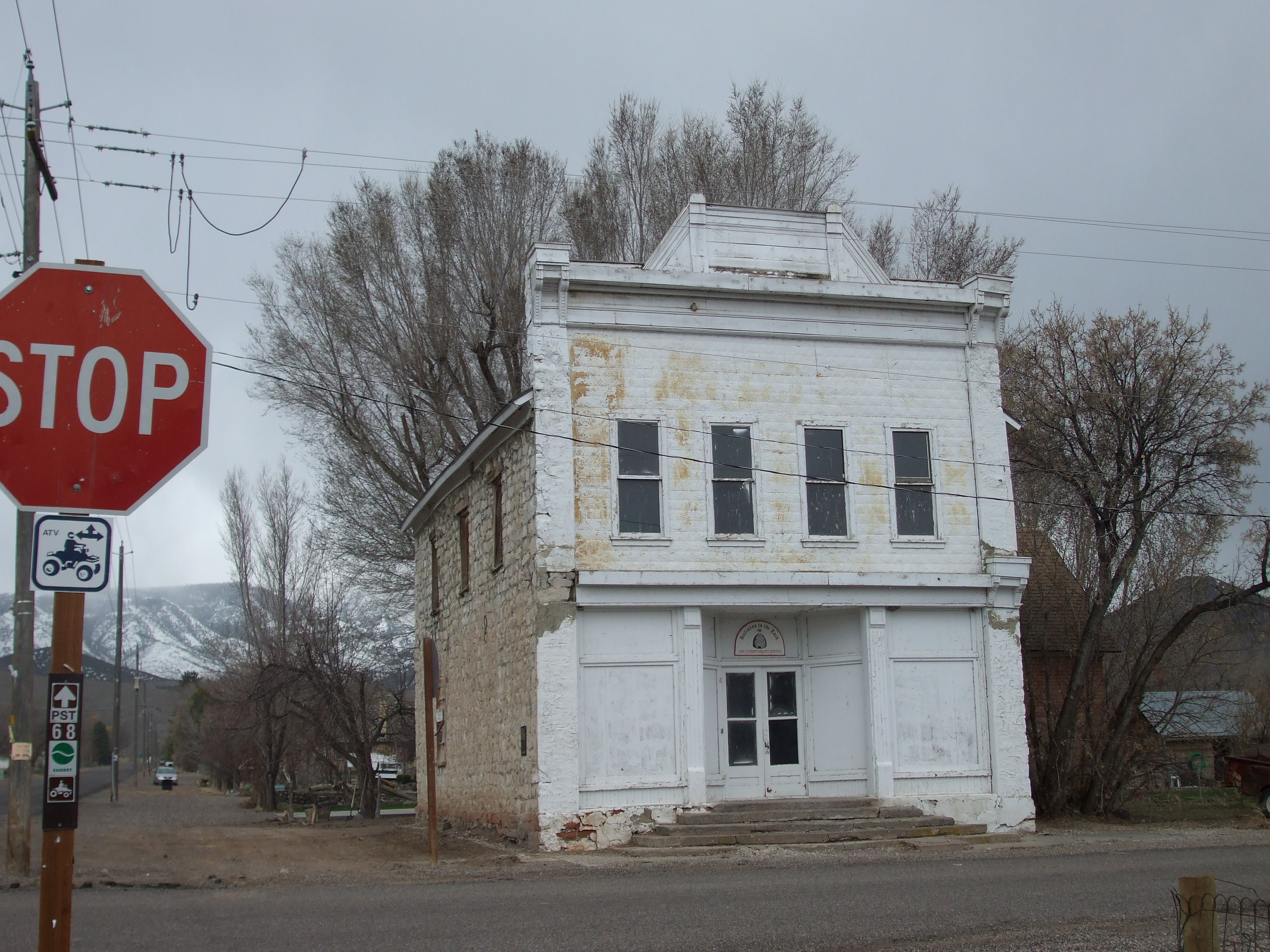

- Location within Utah Location within the United States
- Location: 15 W. Center St., Glenwood, Utah
- Coordinates: 38°45′47″N 111°59′23″W
- Area: 0.1 acres (0.040 ha)
- Built: 1878, 1912
- Built by: Multiple
- Architectural style: Early Commercial
- NRHP reference No.: 80003960
- Added to NRHP: April 29, 1980

The Glenwood Cooperative Store, at 15 W. Center St. in Glenwood, Utah, was built in 1878 and updated in 1912. It was listed on the National Register of Historic Places in 1980.

It was deemed "significant as one of the few remaining cooperative stores in Utah built during the United Order Movement of the 1870s. The store is also significant because it is the oldest commercial outlet in Sevier County. Locally the building represents a successful communal past where religion, economics and recreation intermixed."
