= Richfield Carnegie Library =

- U.S. National Register of Historic Places
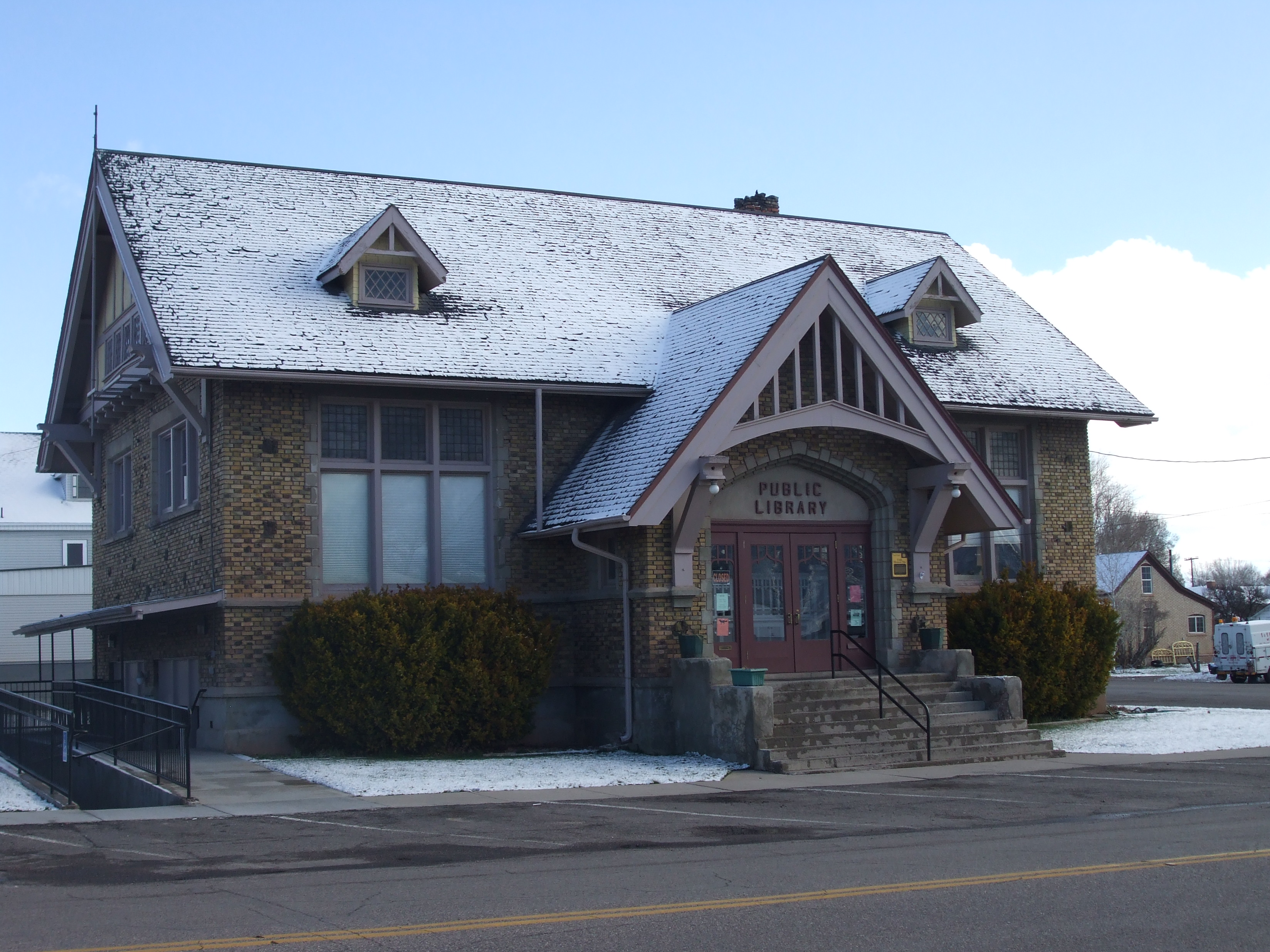

- Location within Utah Location within the United States
- Location: 83 E. Center St., Richfield, Utah
- Coordinates: 38°46′6″N 112°4′57″W
- Area: less than one acre
- Built: 1913
- Built by: Archibald G. Young
- Architect: Watkins & Birch
- Architectural style: Bungalow/Craftsman
- Website: https://www.richfieldlibrary.com/
- MPS: Carnegie Library TR
- NRHP reference No.: 84000153
- Added to NRHP: October 25, 1984

The Richfield Carnegie Library in Richfield, Utah is a building from 1913. It was listed on the National Register of Historic Places in 1984.

== See also ==
- National Register of Historic Places listings in Sevier County, Utah
