= Redmond Town Hall =

- U.S. National Register of Historic Places
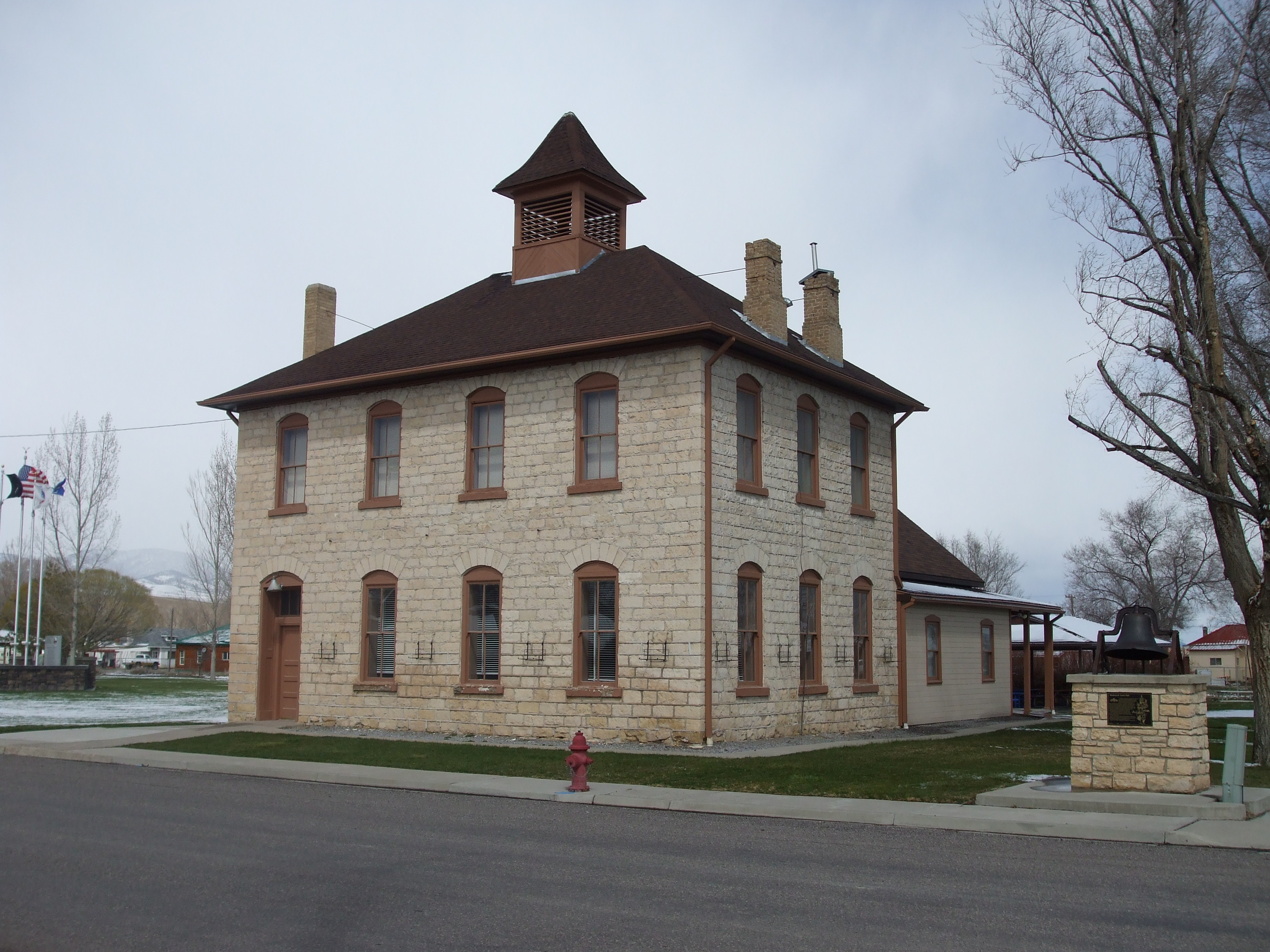

- Location within Utah Location within the United States
- Location: 18 W. Main St., Redmond, Utah
- Coordinates: 39°00′22″N 111°51′50″W
- Area: less than one acre
- Built: 1881
- Architectural style: Vernacular
- NRHP reference No.: 76001836
- Added to NRHP: September 13, 1976

The Redmond Town Hall, at 18 W. Main St. in Redmond, Utah, was built in 1881. It was listed on the National Register of Historic Places in 1976.

It consists of an adobe building, about 24 by 36 feet (7.3 m × 11.0 m) in plan, built in 1881 plus an adjoining two-story rock building built apparently between 1891 and 1897. The adobe building, once a meeting hall, was later used as a jail. The addition served first as a town hall.

It was deemed notable as "one of the best remaining examples in Utah of a building which served as a community center for religious, educational and political purposes. The original adobe structure with the larger rock addition also stands as an excellent example of the evolution of community buildings in rural pioneer Utah."

In 1976 the building was being renovated.
