= Redmond Hotel =

- U.S. National Register of Historic Places
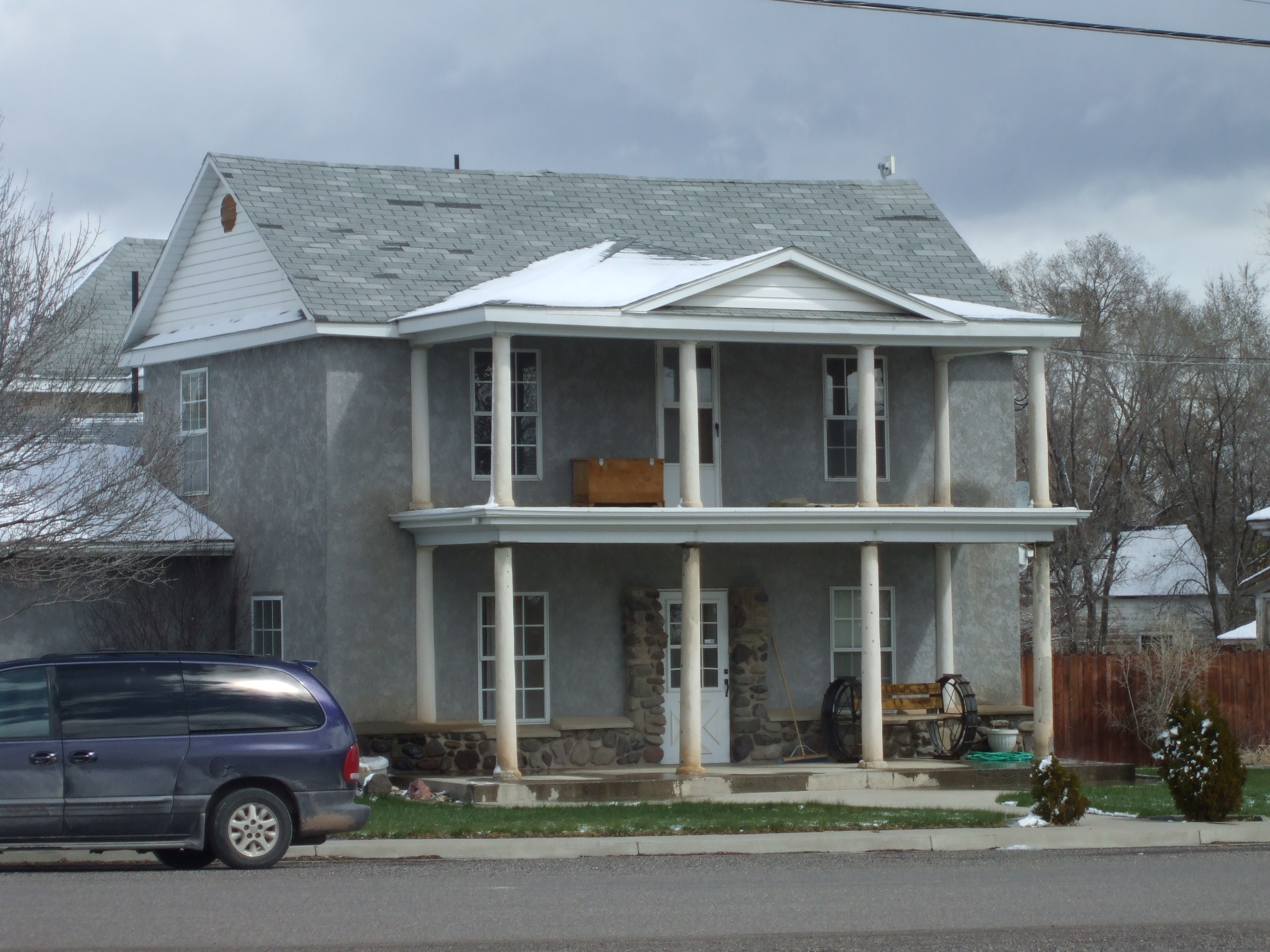

- Location within Utah Location within the United States
- Location: 15 E. Main St., Redmond, Utah
- Coordinates: 39°00′22″N 111°51′48″W
- Area: 0.5 acres (0.20 ha)
- Built: 1879
- NRHP reference No.: 80003964
- Added to NRHP: June 20, 1980

The Redmond Hotel, at 15 E. Main St. in Redmond, Utah, was built in 1879. It was listed on the National Register of Historic Places in 1980.

It was deemed "significant as a good example of a public boarding house in a rural, Mormon community. Based upon a comprehensive survey of Sevier County, it is the best example of this building type in the county. It is also an excellent example of structural adaptation of a building to local events for the 'hotel' has evolved as the community evolved. The Redmond Hotel stands today as one of the best remembered 'old hotels' in Sevier County."
