= Peterson–Burr House =

Historic house in Utah, United States

- U.S. National Register of Historic Places
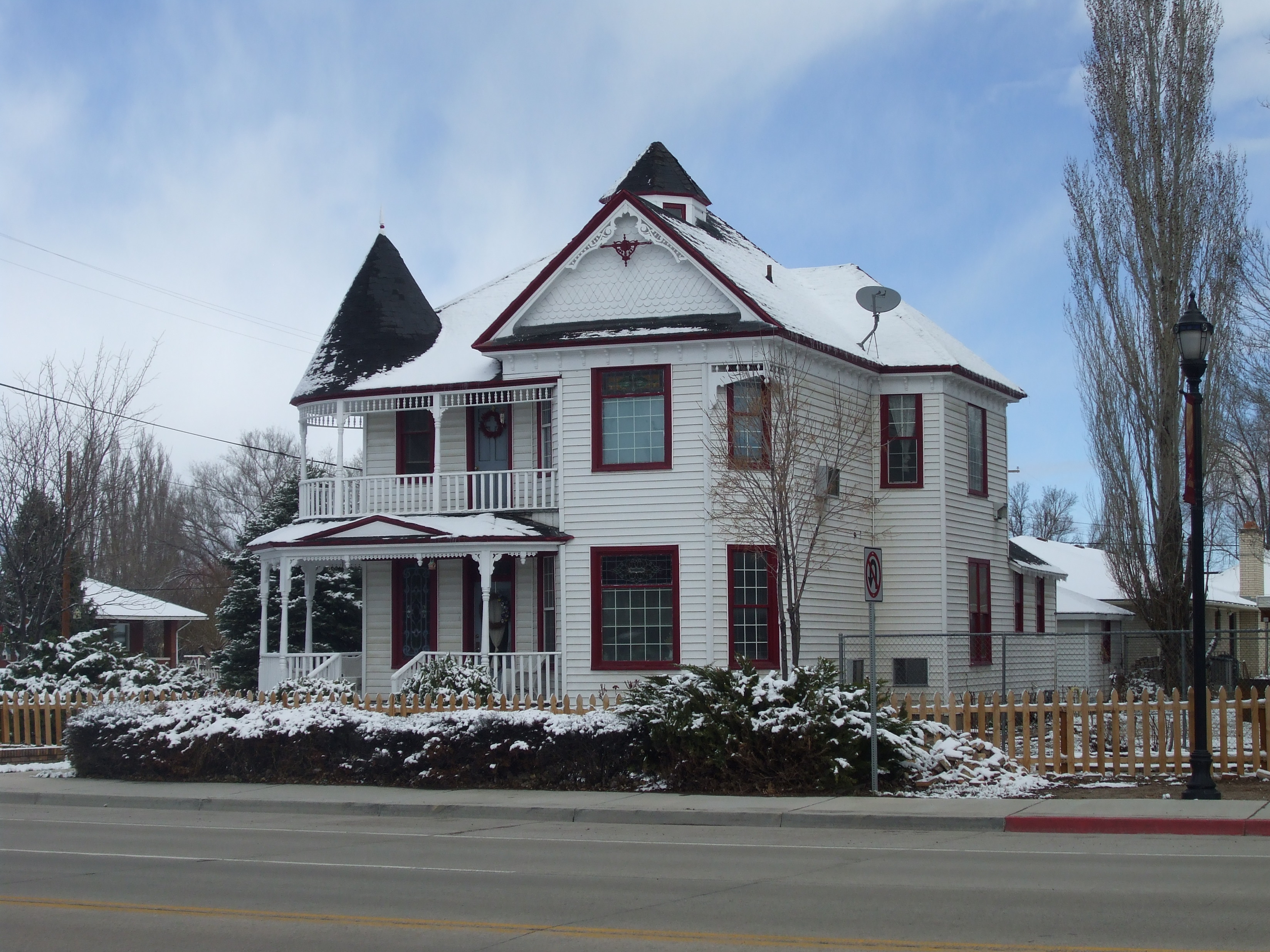
- The house in April 2010

- Location within Utah Location within the United States
- Location: 190 West Main, Salina, Utah
- Coordinates: 38°57′28″N 111°51′43″W
- Area: less than one acre
- Built: 1900
- Built by: Peterson, P. J.
- Architectural style: Queen Anne
- NRHP reference No.: 94000037
- Added to NRHP: February 18, 1994

The Peterson–Burr House is a historic two-story house in Salina, Utah. It was built in 1900 by P. J. Peterson, an immigrant from Denmark who became a furniture and hardware store owner in Salina, and served as the mayor and as a member of the Utah State Legislature. The house was designed in the Queen Anne architectural style. It belonged to Gilbert M. Burr, a car dealer and Mormon bishop, from 1919 to 1982, and it was remodelled as a bed and breakfast in 1983. It has been listed on the National Register of Historic Places since February 18, 1994.

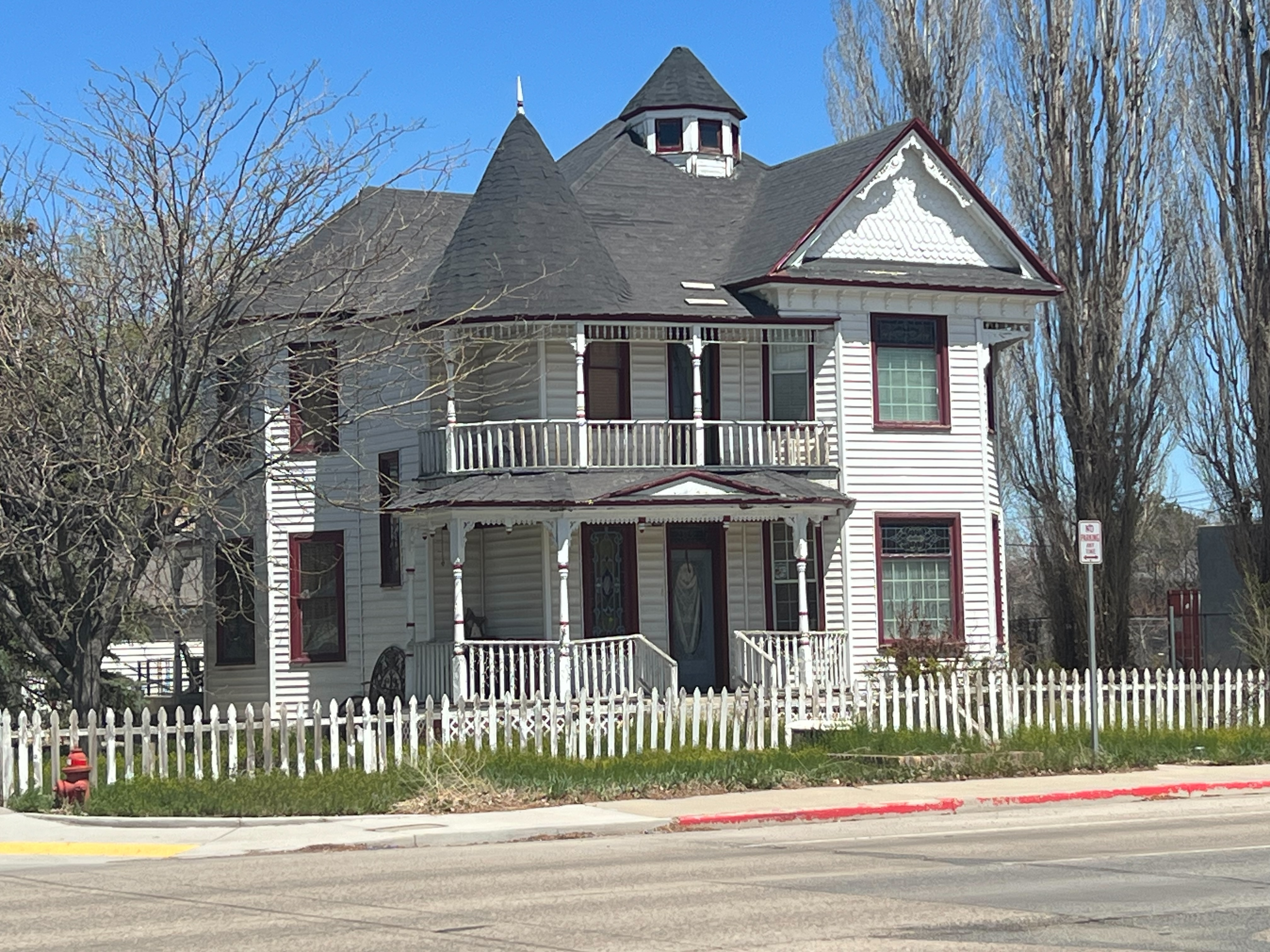
the house in April 2023
