= Elsinore Sugar Factory =

- U.S. National Register of Historic Places
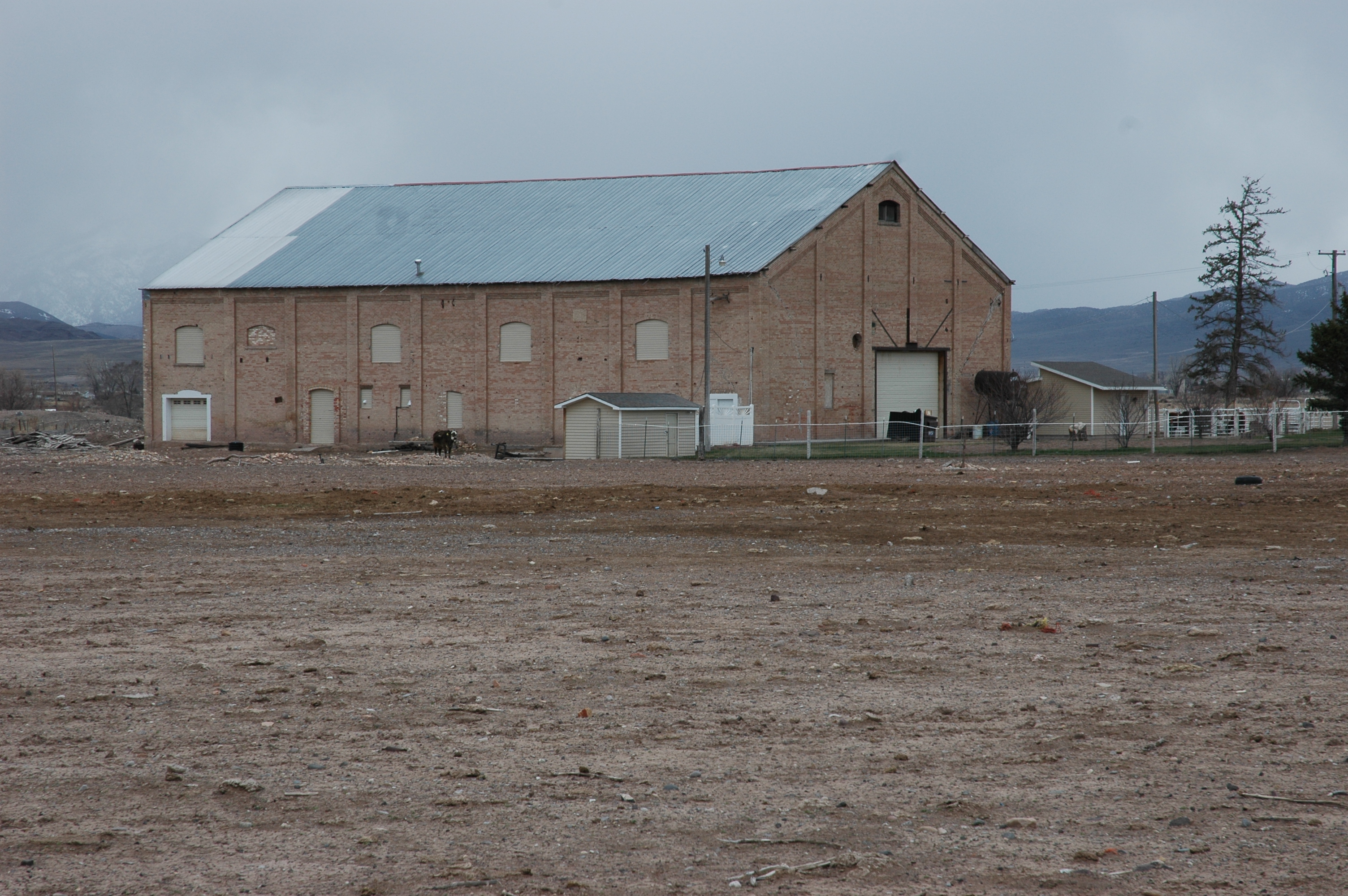
- Warehouse building

- Location within Utah Location within the United States
- Nearest city: Elsinore, Utah
- Coordinates: 38°40′53″N 112°07′24″W
- Area: 21.5 acres (8.7 ha)
- Built: 1910
- Built by: E.H. Dyer & Sons
- NRHP reference No.: 80003959
- Added to NRHP: June 17, 1980

The Elsinore Sugar Factory, in Sevier County, Utah, near Elsinore, Utah, was built in 1910. It was listed on the National Register of Historic Places in 1980.

Two buildings of the factory complex of the Utah-Idaho Sugar Company survive: a factory office and rooming house building, and a warehouse building. These buildings were deemed significant for association with the company, which was "the single most important agri-business in Sevier County history. The factory's economic and social impact on local communities, as assessed by a recent county wide historical survey, exceeds that of any other business enterprise for the years 1911 to 1928. Also, the Elsinore plant is significant as a good representative of the overall sugar beet industry in Utah and as an excellant [sic] example of the Utah-Idaho Sugar Company's contribution to the history of the state."

The factory office and rooming house building is a one-and-a-half-story rectangular-plan building. Its ground floor is brick and includes segmental arches at its openings. Above it is frame-built with shingle siding. Paired shed dormers break the roof along the broad sides. There is a small portico with a gable roof over the rear entrance. The factory office used the ground floor; above were rooms for seasonal employees.

The warehouse is a large brick building, also rectangular in plan and with a gable roof, and also with segmental arches over openings. The appearance of a cornice is created by brick corbelling at the roof line.

The complex was built by E.H. Dyer & Sons.

The term Weight Station Inn has also applied.
