= Sevier Ward Church =

Historic church in Utah, United States

- U.S. National Register of Historic Places
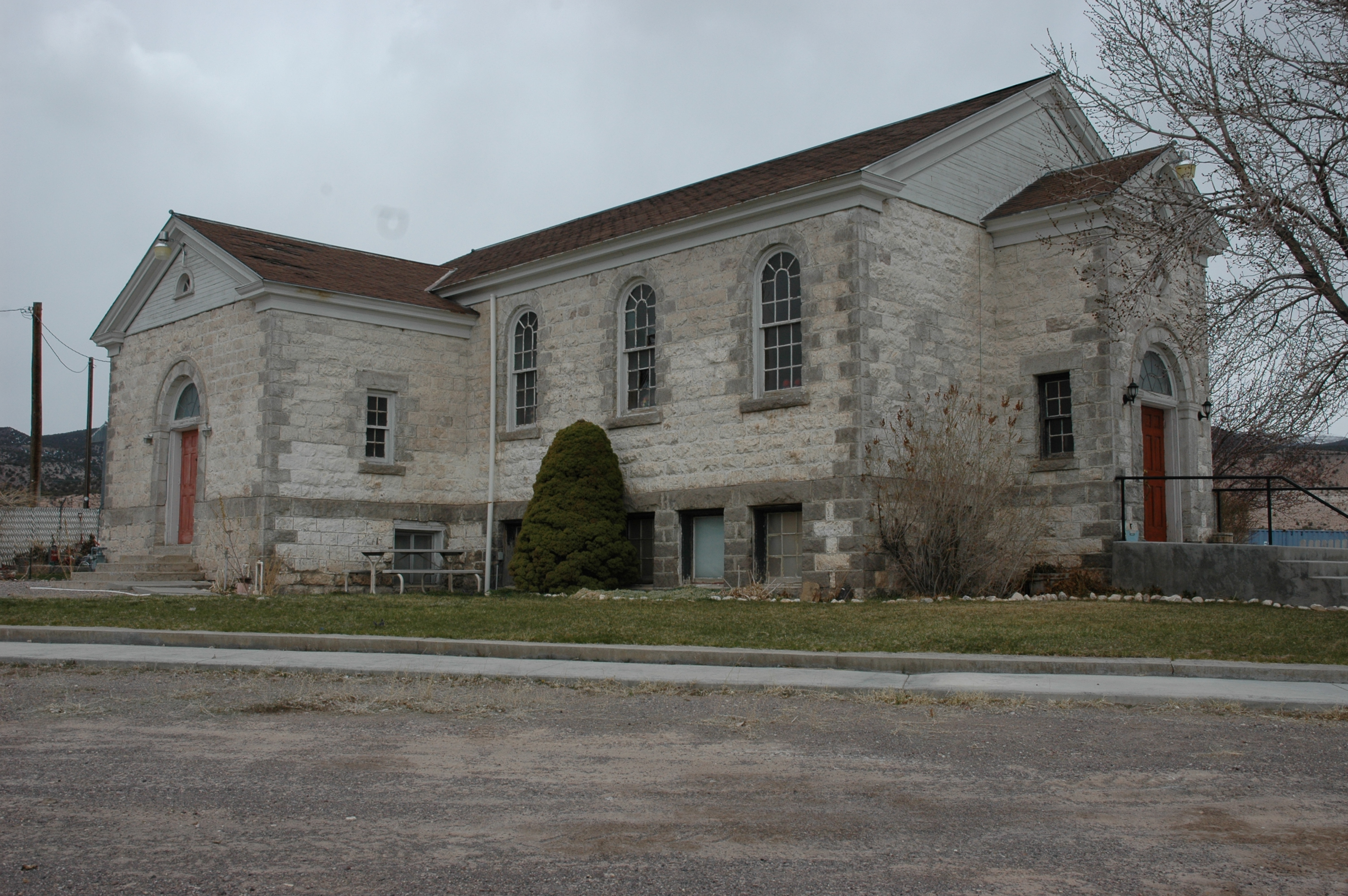
- The church in 2010

- Location within Utah Location within the United States
- Nearest city: Sevier, Utah
- Coordinates: 38°35′43″N 112°14′58″W
- Area: less than one acre
- Built: 1930
- Built by: John Marius Johnson
- NRHP reference No.: 80003969
- Added to NRHP: June 24, 1980

The Sevier Ward Church is a historic church in Sevier, Utah. It was built in 1930 by John Marius Johnson, an immigrant from Denmark who became a "well-known stonemason" in Utah, on land that belonged to J.C. Baierline, and deeded to Mormon Bishop Levie in 1933. In 1973, The Church of Jesus Christ of Latter-day Saints sold the building to Martha Carlsruh, who remodelled it as an antique store. The building was vacant by 1980.

Its architecture was described as having "rather eclectic design", "suggestive of a New England meetinghouse because of the temple-like central mass fronted by an extending, gabled pavilion. This pavilion has Greek returns and is pierced with a fanlight at the top, a diamond shaped window and round arched doorway which also has a fanlight. On the north elevation are five round arched windows and on the south are three round arched windows and an extending pavilion similar to the east pavilion."

It has been listed on the National Register of Historic Places since June 24, 1980.
