= B.F. Larsen =

American painter (1882–1970)

Bent Franklin Larsen
- Born: May 10, 1882; Monroe, Utah, U.S.
- Died: January 1970 (aged 87); Provo, Utah, U.S.
- Education: Snow College; Brigham Young University; University of Utah; Art Institute of Chicago; Académie Julian; Académie Colarossi; Académie de la Grande Chaumière
- Occupations: Educator, painter
- Spouse: Geneva Day

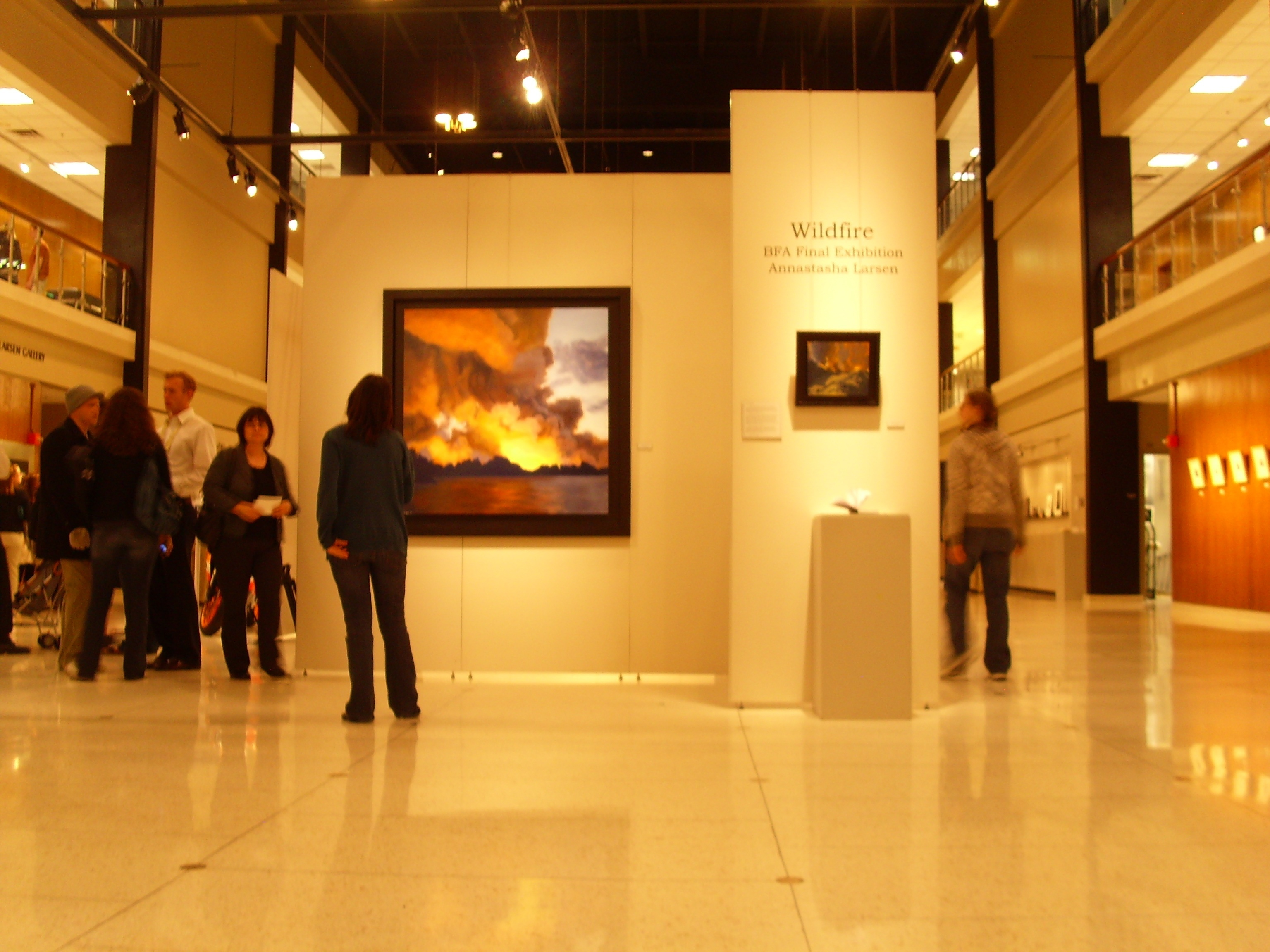
B.F. Larsen Gallery in Utah

B.F. Larsen (May 10, 1882 - January 1970) was an American art educator and painter. He taught art at Brigham Young University for five decades, and he was the chair of its Department of Art. He painted French and Utahn landscapes.

== Early life ==
Larsen was born in 1882 in Monroe, Utah. He graduated from Snow College, followed by Brigham Young University in 1908.

== Teaching career and French influence ==
Larsen began his career as an educator. Before attending BYU, he had taught in Cove and Green River, and in his hometown of Monroe. In his last year at BYU, he taught at the Springville High School in Springville.

Larsen began his five-decade teaching career at Brigham Young University in 1908, and he was eventually promoted to full professor and chair the Department of Art. He took a hiatus in the 1920s to study at the Art Institute of Chicago in 1922, and to live in France in the 1924–1925, where he studied at the Académie Julian, the Académie Colarossi, and the Académie de la Grande Chaumière. He was also trained by Cubist painter André Lhote.

Shortly after his return to Utah, Larsen completed his first painting in 1927. For the next four decades, he painted French and Utahn landscapes. Larsen became a member of the American Water Color Society. According to Utah Art, Utah Artists, "His colors, especially yellow, bright but subtle, were applied with vitality." For the Utah Artists Project, Larsen "made a varied contribution to Utah's artistic tradition."

Larsen retired as professor emeritus at BYU in 1953.

== Personal life and death ==
Larsen was a member of the Church of Jesus Christ of Latter-day Saints, and he married Geneva Day in the Manti Utah Temple.

Larsen died in 1970 in Provo, Utah, at age 87. His papers are held at BYU's Harold B. Lee Library.
