= Jens Larson Jenson Lime Kiln =

Historic place in Sevier County, Utah, United States

- U.S. National Register of Historic Places
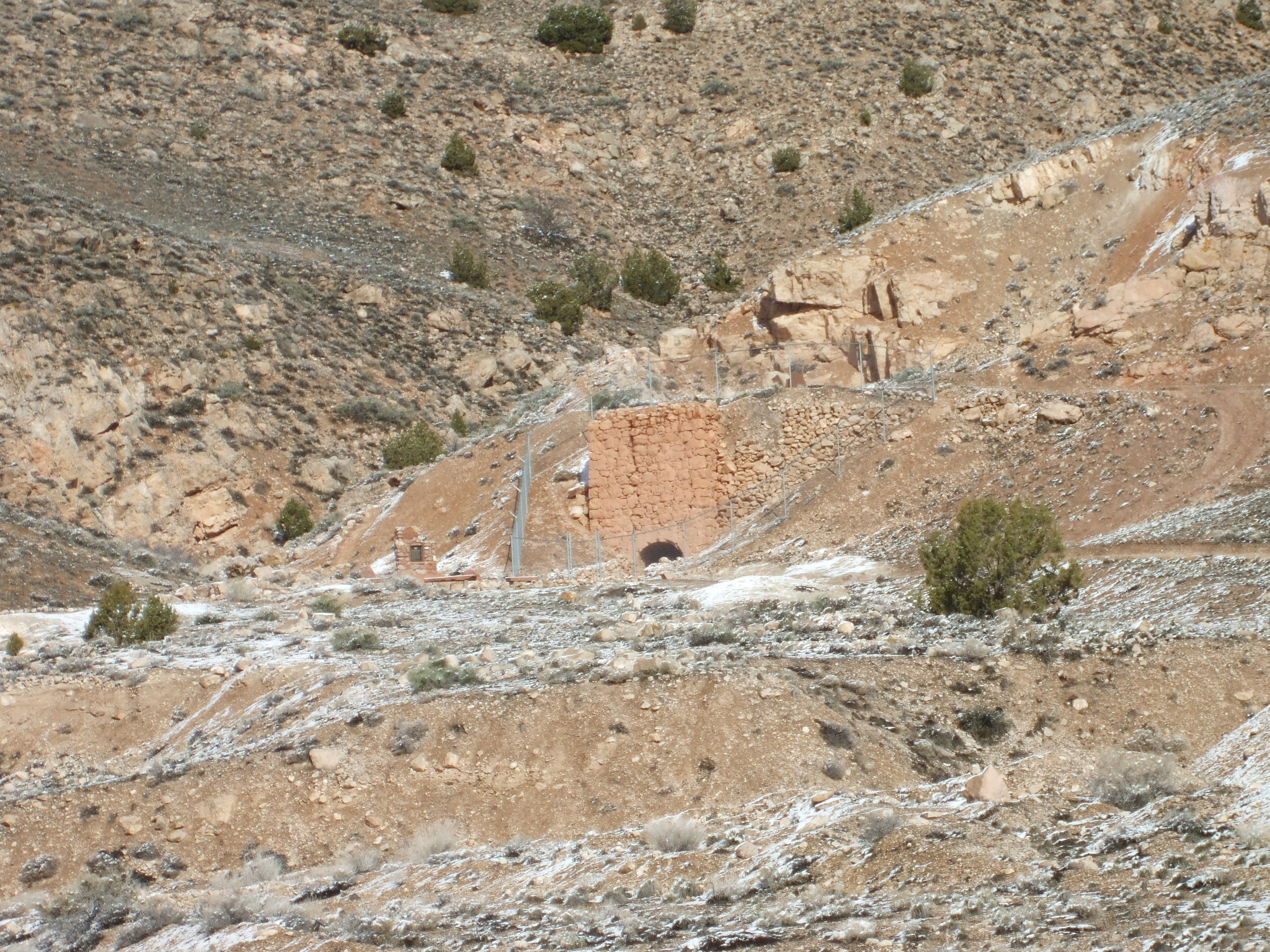

- Location within Utah Location within the United States
- Nearest city: Richfield, Utah
- Coordinates: 38°47′36″N 112°05′08″W
- Area: less than one acre
- Built: 1903
- Built by: J.H. Kyhl
- NRHP reference No.: 78002693
- Added to NRHP: December 22, 1978

The Jens Larson Jenson Lime Kiln, is a historic site in Sevier County, Utah, United States, north of, but just outside the city limits of, Richfield, Utah, that is listed on the National Register of Historic Places (NRHP).

== Description ==
The site primary included a lime kiln, built in 1903, which was deemed significant as a structure

important in the development of communities in the Sevier Valley. Built by Jens L. Jenson, Richfield's "well-known" lime burner, the kiln cured lime which was used for mortar utilized in the construction of numerous rock and brick structures, as well as in the production of the whitewash used on structures basic to successful rural life. Jens Larson "Limeburner" Jenson (sometimes spelled Jensen) was born in Dalby, Scona, Sweden, July 14, 1827. He was baptized into The Church of Jesus Christ of Latter-day Saints in 1855, and arrived in Utah in 1859 as a member of the Rowley Handcart Company. Jenson lived the doctrine of plural marriage, being joined to three women; and later served a sixty-two day sentence for polygamy.

The site was listed on the NRHP December 22, 1978.

== See also ==
- National Register of Historic Places listings in Sevier County, Utah
