= Salina Municipal Building and Library =

- U.S. National Register of Historic Places
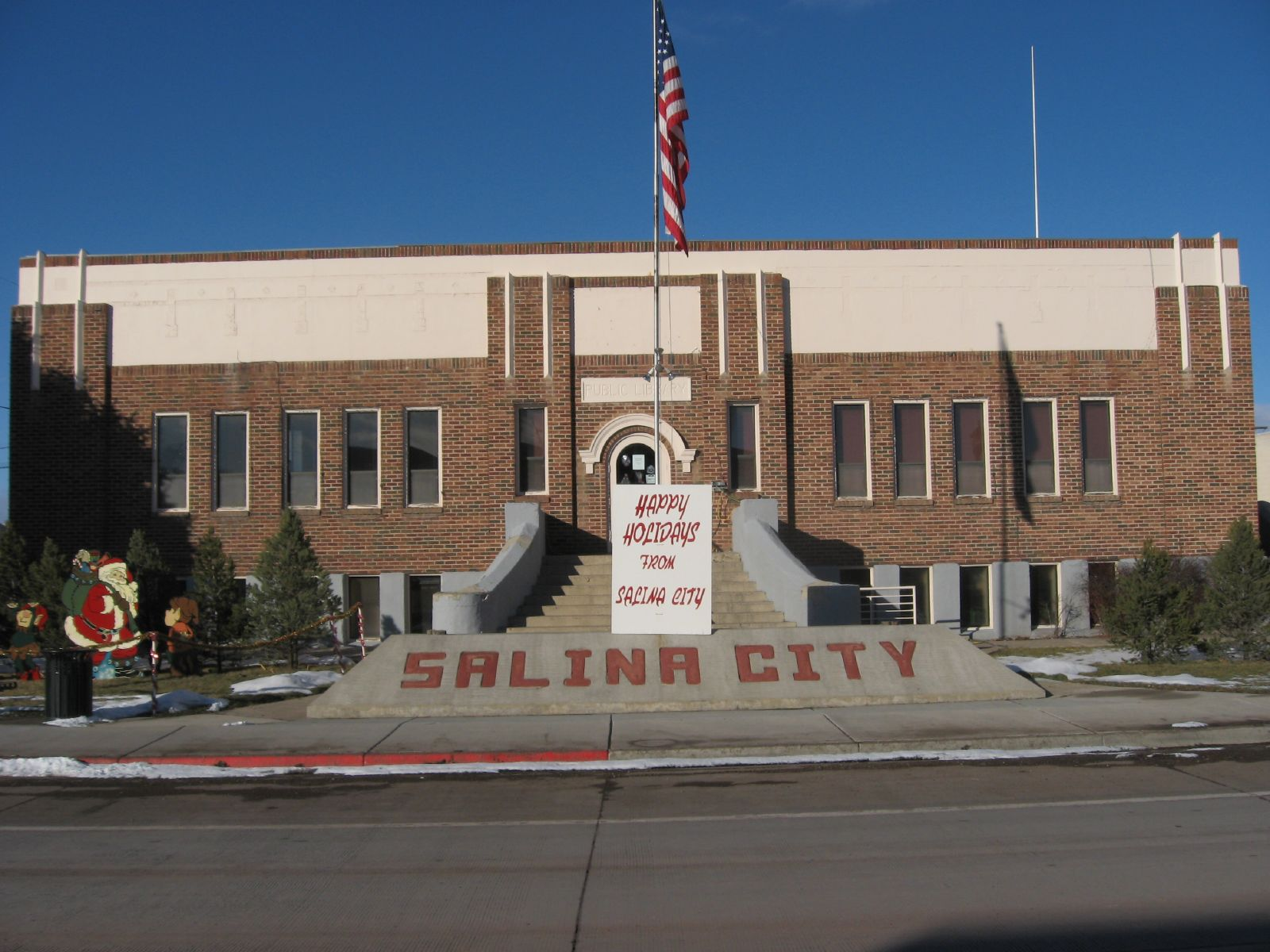
- The building in 2007

- Location within Utah Location within the United States
- Location: 90 West Main, Salina, Utah
- Coordinates: 38°57′28″N 111°51′38″W
- Area: 0.4 acres (0.16 ha)
- Built: 1936
- Built by: M.W. Breinholt
- Architectural style: Prairie School, Art Deco
- MPS: Public Works Buildings TR
- NRHP reference No.: 86000742
- Added to NRHP: April 9, 1986

The Salina Municipal Building and Library is a historic building in Salina, Utah. The original city hall was built in 1887, and torn down to make way for this new building. Construction began in 1936, and it was completed in 1937. It was built under the Works Progress Administration program by M.W. Breinholt, who was a building contractor in nearby Richfield, Utah for six decades. The building was designed in the Prairie School and Art Deco architectural styles. It has been listed on the National Register of Historic Places since April 9, 1986.
