= Elsinore White Rock Schoolhouse =

- U.S. National Register of Historic Places
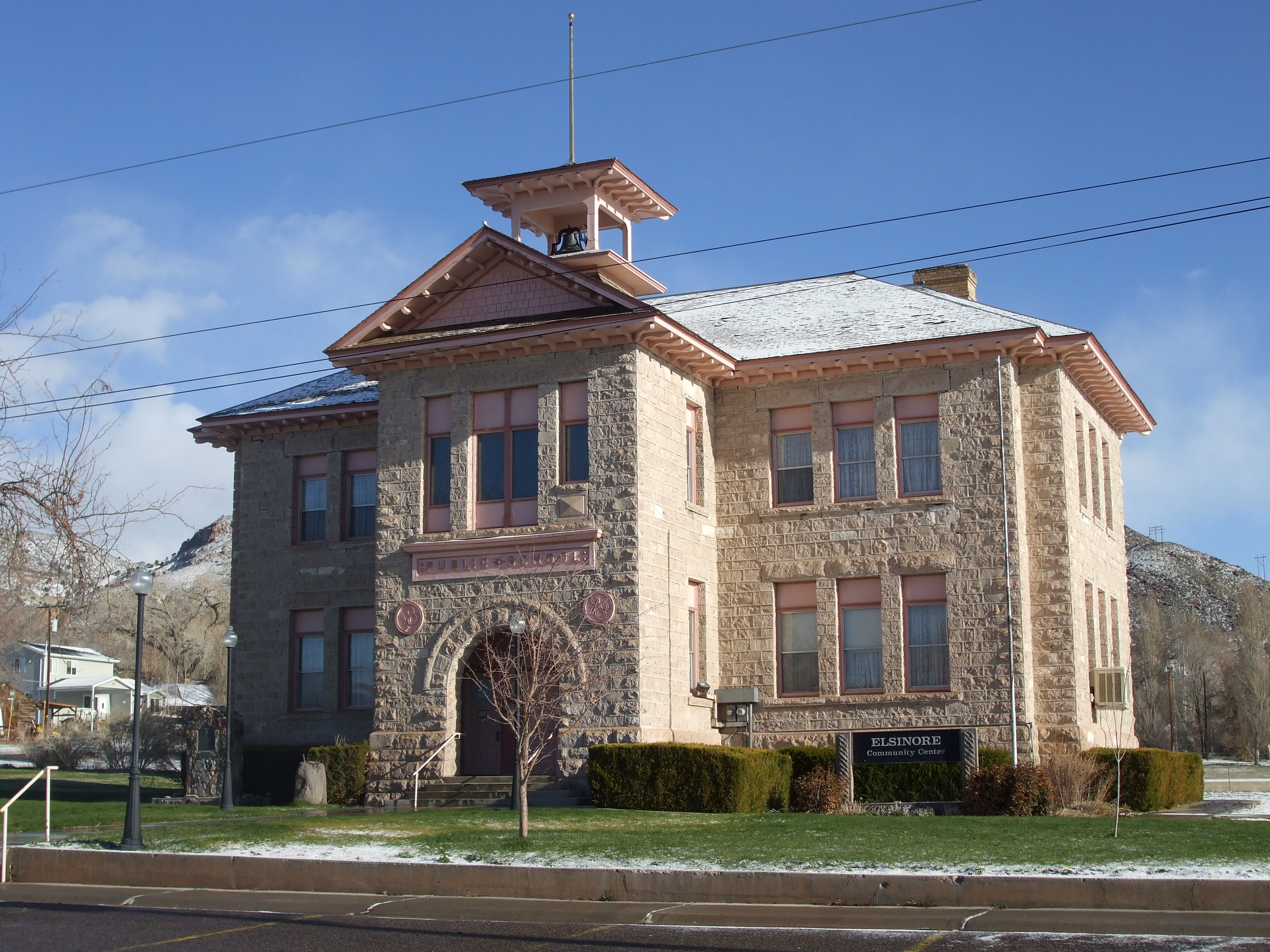

- Location within Utah
- Location: 25 S. 100 East, Elsinore, Utah
- Coordinates: 38°41′10″N 112°08′50″W
- Area: 5.6 acres (2.3 ha)
- Built: 1896-98
- Built by: Johnson, John Marinus, et al.
- Architect: Davis, T.T.
- NRHP reference No.: 78002692
- Added to NRHP: January 18, 1978

The Elsinore White Rock Schoolhouse, at 25 S. 100 East in Elsinore, Utah, was built in 1896. It was listed on the National Register of Historic Places in 1978.

It is a two-and-a-half-story building on a raised full basement, built of native white limestone, about 35 by 76 feet (11 m × 23 m) in plan.

It was built 23 years after Mormon converts from Scandinavia settled Elsinore, and was built by local craftsmen who were either Scandinavian born or children thereof. Per its National Register nomination:

Construction of the building commenced in 1896 and was completed in 1898. The white rock -was' quarried from a mountain 12 miles southeast of Elsinore near the Piute-Sevier county line. The quarried rock was transported by wagon from the quarry to the construction site. Most of the freighters were only able to make one trip per day but N.P. Anderson, a Dane, became the exception by making two trips each day. / John Marinus Johnson, a stone cutter and mason trained in America, contracted to build the school according to plans prepared by architect T.T. Davis. The stone work done by Johnson and his sons exemplify a remarkably high quality of stonework. / Most of the able bodied men of Elsinore participated in the construction of the School. Carl and Hans Johnson, Niels Anderson were the blacksmiths on the project. Peter "Wheelmaker" Christensen, a wheelmaker by trade, kept the rock bearing wagons in repair. Tenders and mud mixers were Ras Nielson, Chris "Cute" M. Anderson, Hans Johnson, Jim Hermansen, Fred Lott, and Chris Christiansen. Chris Christopherson did a great deal of the brick work, including the chimney. The carpenters were Christian Canutson and James "Black Jim" P. Hansen. / Thomas Christian Jensen, the father of Bishop J.I. Jensen, and James C. Nielson made the silver tone bell in the belfry. Thomas Christian was a brazier by vocation. The bell was constructed at the foundry on the canal behind Jensen's home in Elsinore. The bell rang the children to and from school until the closing of the school in 1958.

The bell "disappeared" sometime during 1970–77.

The building outlasted a brick new school which replaced it, and operated for 60 years, but has been demolished.
