= Young Block =

- U.S. National Register of Historic Places
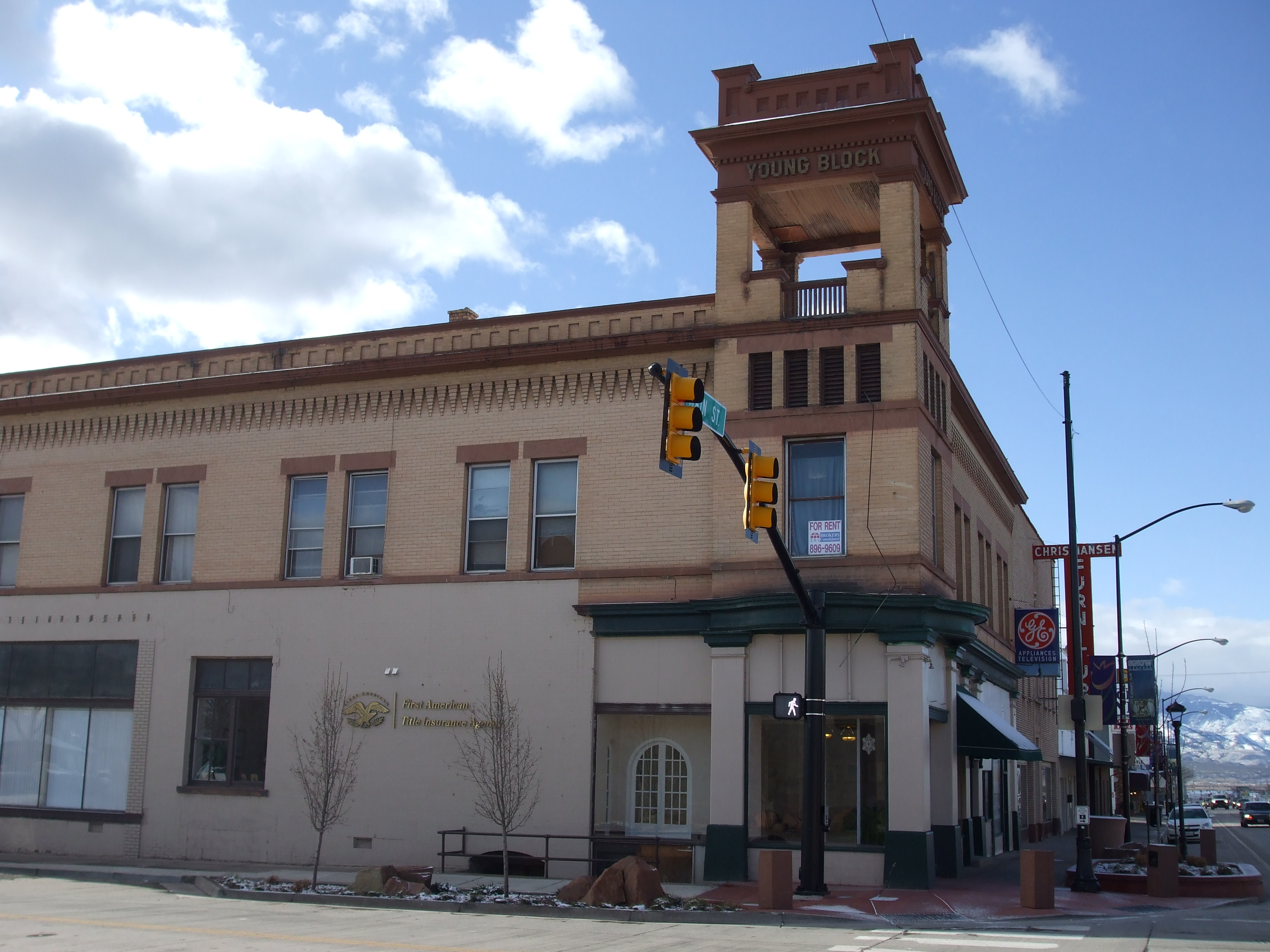

- Location within Utah Location within the United States
- Location: 3-17 S. Main St., Richfield, Utah
- Coordinates: 38°46′04″N 112°05′01″W
- Area: 0.2 acres (0.081 ha)
- Built: 1907
- Built by: Archibald Graham Young
- NRHP reference No.: 80003965
- Added to NRHP: June 24, 1980

The Young Block, at 3–17 S. Main St. in Richfield, Utah, is a building built in 1907. It was listed on the National Register of Historic Places in 1980.

It was built by contractor Archibald Graham Young, a Scottish Mormon immigrant, and was deemed "the most architecturally significant commercial building in Sevier County and one of the more commercially significant buildings in Central Utah."

It is a two-story brick building on the corner of Main and Center streets, with a square corner tower rising above.
