= Salina Presbyterian Church =

Historic church in Utah, United States

- U.S. National Register of Historic Places
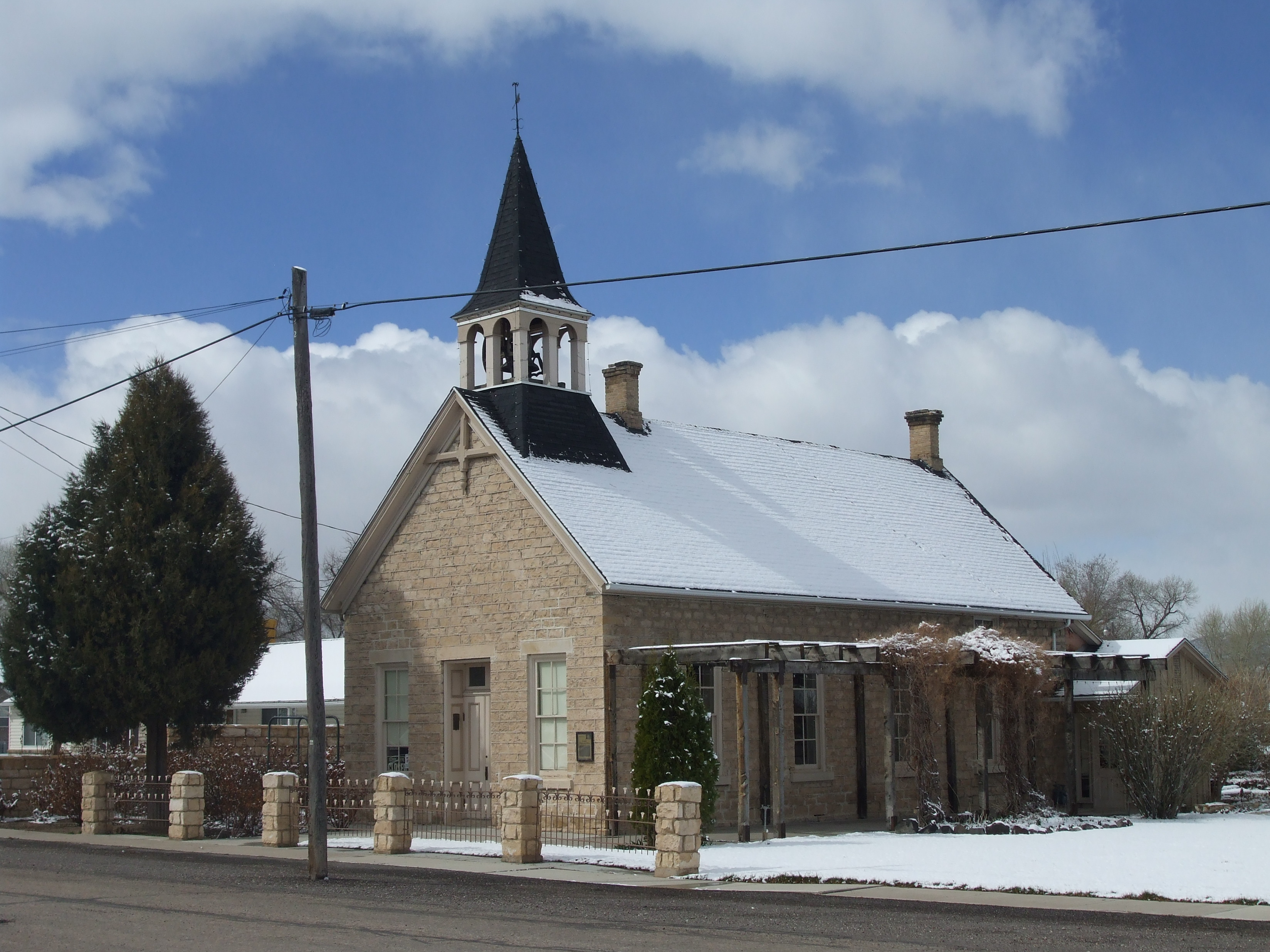

- Location within Utah Location within the United States
- Location: 204 S. 1st East, Salina, Utah
- Coordinates: 38°57′17″N 111°51′27″W
- Area: less than one acre
- Built: 1884
- NRHP reference No.: 80003967
- Added to NRHP: March 27, 1980

Salina Presbyterian Church (also known as The Crosby Memorial Church) is a historic church at 204 S. 1st East in Salina, Utah.

It was built in 1884 and added to the National Register of Historic Places in 1980. The building is now being restored as a private residence.
