= Monroe City Hall (Monroe, Utah) =

- U.S. National Register of Historic Places
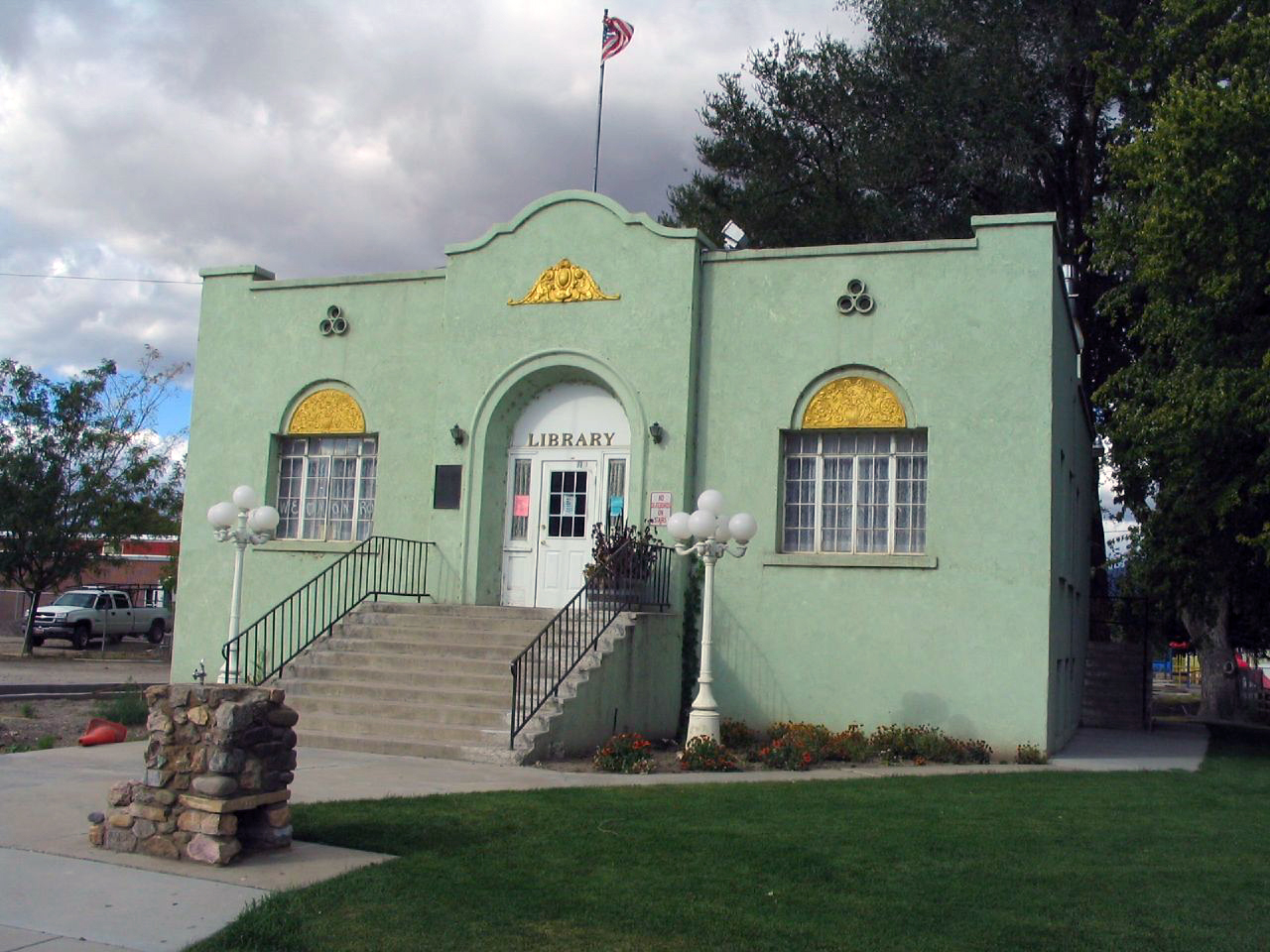
- The building now houses Monroe Public Library.

- Location within Utah Location within the United States
- Location: 55 N. Main St., Monroe, Utah
- Coordinates: 38.632764°N 112.121789°W
- Area: 1.6 acres (0.65 ha)
- Built: 1934
- MPS: Public Works Buildings TR
- NRHP reference No.: 85000814
- Added to NRHP: April 1, 1985

The Monroe City Hall in Monroe, Utah was built in 1934. Located at 55 N. Main St., it was listed on the National Register of Historic Places in 1985. Today it houses Monroe Public Library.

The building is suggested to be of Spanish Colonial Revival style, or it might be deemed to be a Mission Revival in style.

It is a one-story building with a flat roof and a parapet.
