= Joseph William Parker Farm =

- U.S. National Register of Historic Places
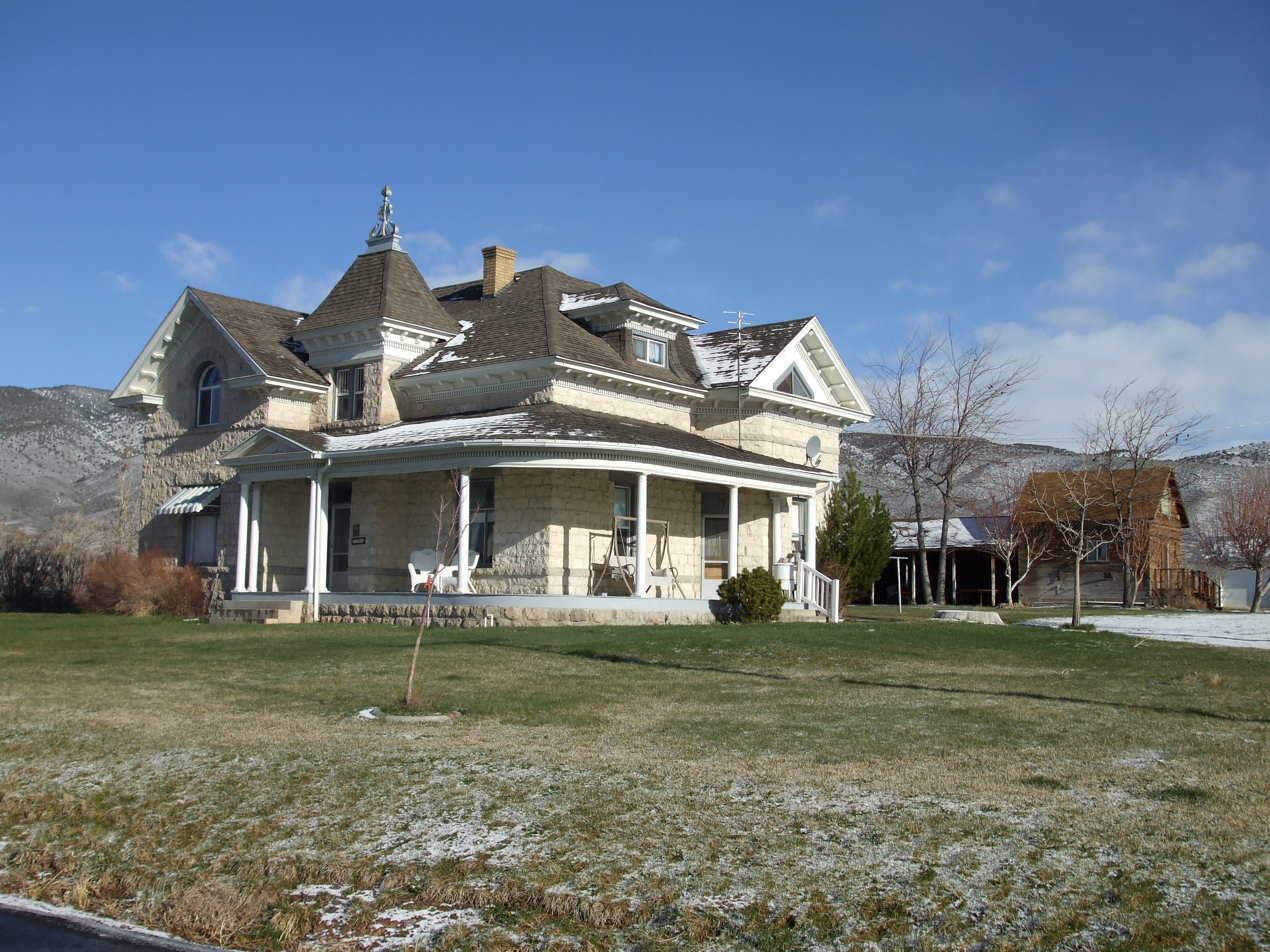

- Location within Utah Location within the United States
- Location: 2.5 miles (4.0 km) northeast of Joseph, Utah
- Coordinates: 38°39′18″N 112°11′39″W
- Area: 2.5 acres (1.0 ha)
- Built: 1892
- Built by: Archibald G. Young
- Architectural style: Late Victorian
- NRHP reference No.: 77001318
- Added to NRHP: March 25, 1977

The Joseph William Parker Farm, in Sevier County, Utah, near Joseph, Utah, was listed on the National Register of Historic Places in 1977. The listing includes seven contributing buildings on 2.5 acres (1.0 ha).

The property includes the original one-room log cabin residence of the farm built in 1892–93; it has been moved a short distance from its original location. It was built of cut cottonwood logs, and now rests on a cement block foundation.

Its main house, built of igooloo, is Late Victorian in style and was built by contractor Archibald G. Young. Young may possibly have designed the house or its design may have been taken from a pattern book.
