= Salina Hospital =

- Formerly listed on the U.S. National Register of Historic Places
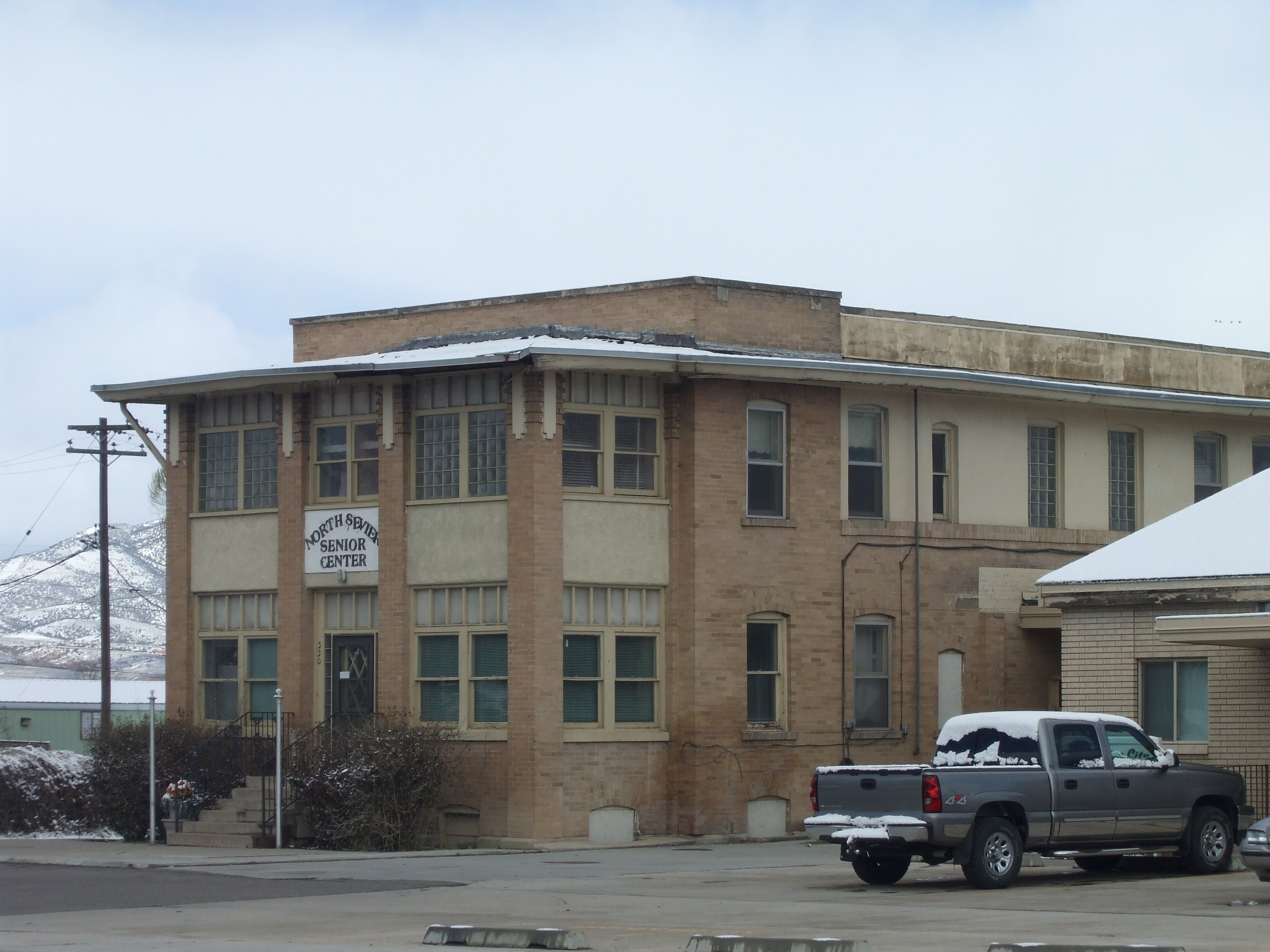

- Location within Utah Location within the United States
- Location: 330 W. Main St., Salina, Utah
- Coordinates: 38°57′28″N 111°51′54″W
- Area: 0.3 acres (0.12 ha)
- Built: 1917
- Architectural style: Prairie School
- NRHP reference No.: 80003966

Significant dates
- Added to NRHP: June 19, 1980
- Removed from NRHP: August 15, 2023

The Salina Hospital, at 330 W. Main St. in Salina, Utah, was built in 1917. Later the Salina Senior Citizen Center, it was listed on the National Register of Historic Places in 1980. It was delisted in 2023.

It has allusion to Prairie School style in its design. It was deemed "significant as one of the first medical facilities in Utah to provide health care to a rural agricultural community", and as the most important health care center for central Utah during the 1920s and 1930s. The hospital was discovered through a county-wide historical survey to be the best locally recognized representative of the role medicine had in Sevier County history."
