= Glenwood, Utah =

Town in the state of Utah, United States

- Town
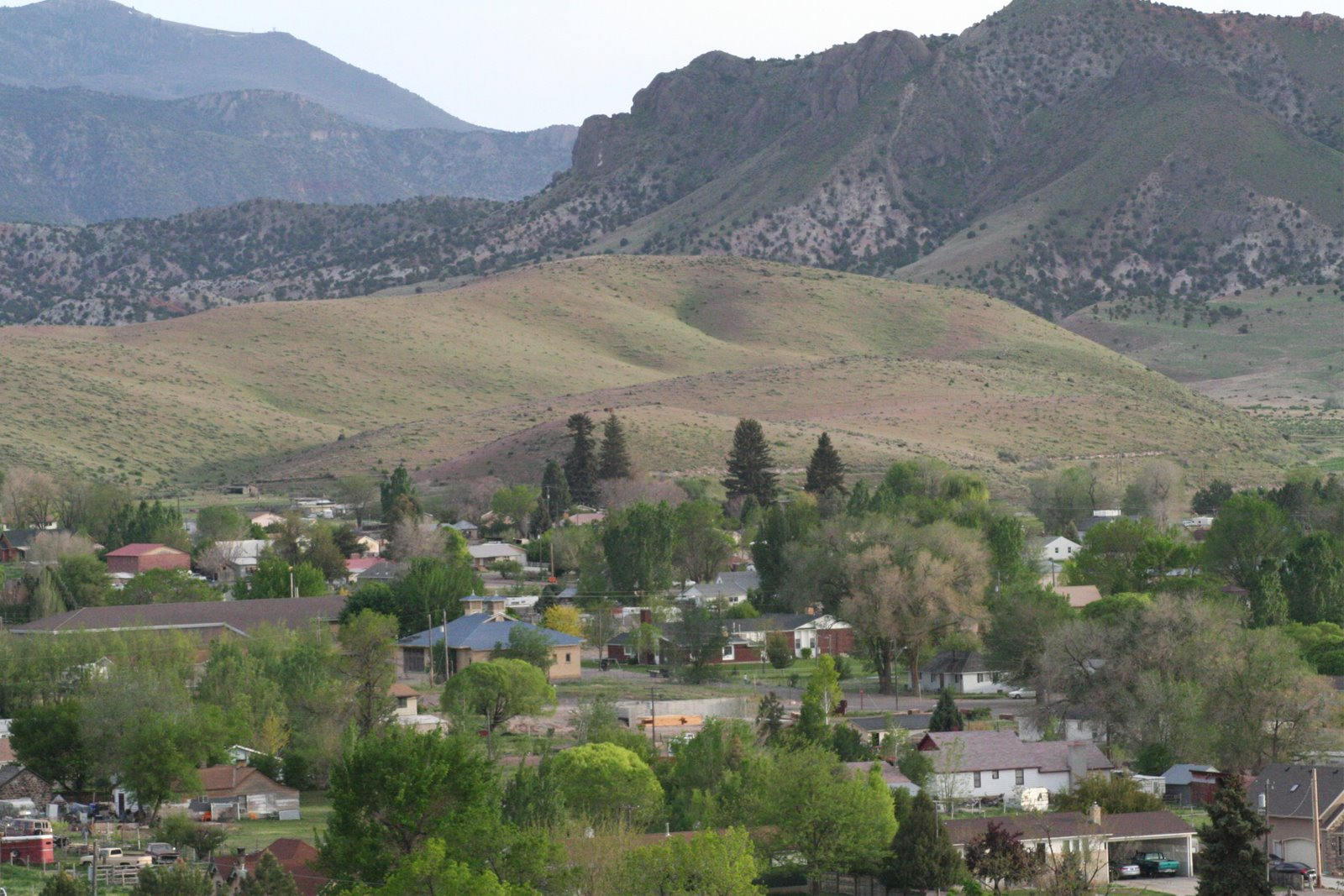

- Location in Sevier County and the state of Utah.
- Coordinates: 38°45′44″N 111°59′22″W
- Country: United States
- State: Utah
- County: Sevier
- Founded: 1863
- Named for: Robert Wilson Glenn

Area
  - Total: 0.52 sq mi (1.35 km^{2})
  - Land: 0.52 sq mi (1.35 km^{2})
  - Water: 0 sq mi (0.00 km^{2})
- Elevation: 5,272 ft (1,607 m)

Population (2020)
  - Total: 474
  - Density: 913.9/sq mi (352.84/km^{2})
- Time zone: UTC-7 (Mountain (MST))
  - Summer (DST): UTC-6 (MDT)
- ZIP code: 84730
- Area code: 435
- FIPS code: 49-29580
- GNIS feature ID: 1441332
- Website: glenwoodtownut.gov

Glenwood is a town in Sevier County, Utah, United States. The population was 474 at the 2020 census.

== History ==
Glenwood was established in 1863 by Mormon pioneers. It was named for an early pioneer, Robert Wilson Glenn. The settlement's original name was Glencoe or Glen Cove but was changed in November 1864 when Orson Hyde (an LDS Church leader) visited the settlement and recommended Glenwood. A stone fort was constructed in April 1866.

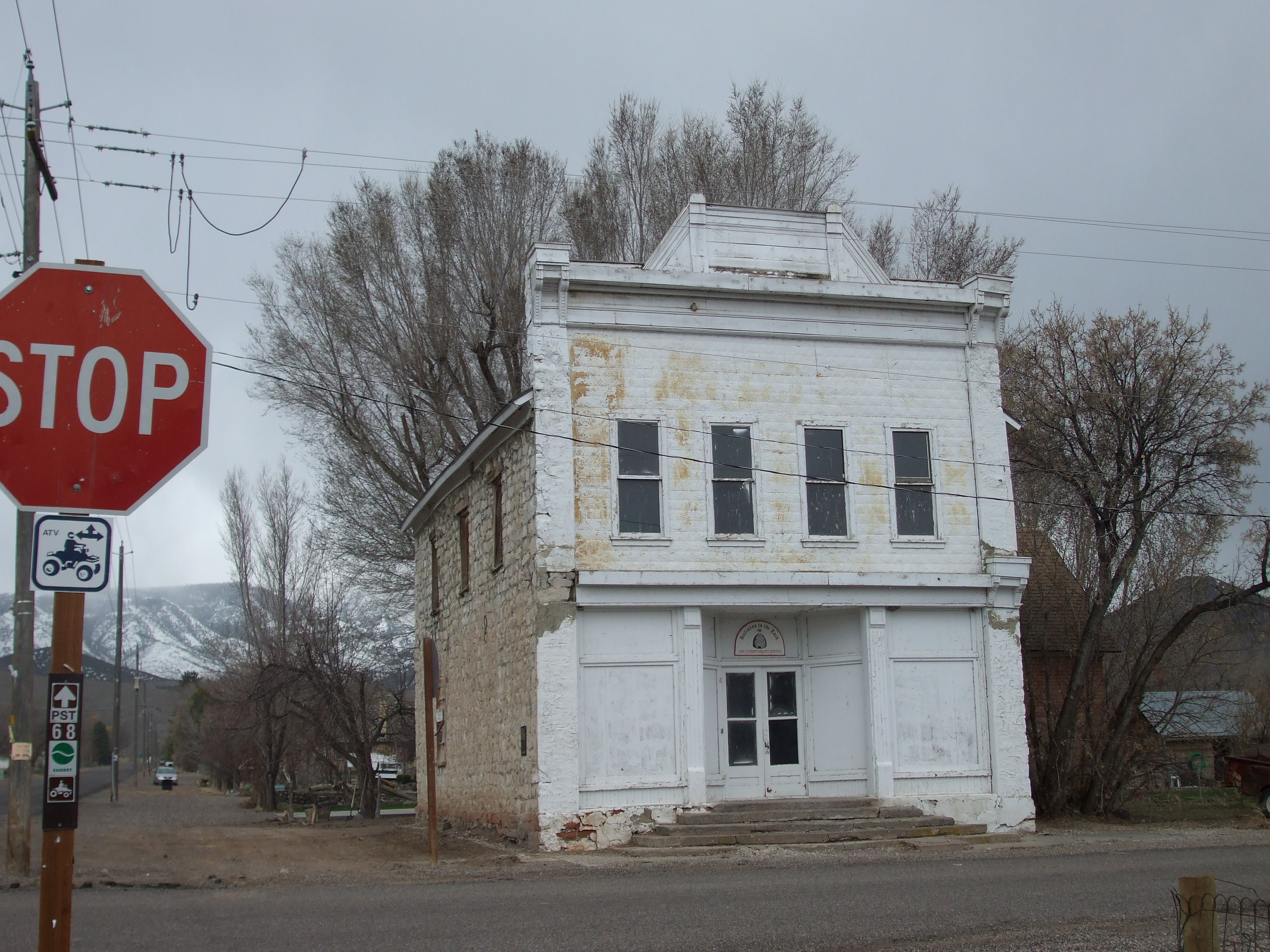
Glenwood Coop Store

The Black Hawk War of 1867 between the settlers and the local Indians left Glenwood deserted for one year, but it was later resettled in 1868 after peace resumed.

Glenwood was an excellent site for a settlement, owing to fresh springs that naturally bubbled from the hills east of town. The springs still feed Glenwood's culinary water supply and supply water for the State of Utah fish hatchery southeast of town. A gristmill was built in Glenwood that became the first of its kind in the county.

A ZCMI co-operative building was built at the intersection of Main and Center streets in 1878. For several years it was the largest building in the county. As families moved out of Glenwood, Isaac Washington Pierce Jr., a resident of Glenwood, bought out all shares in the store and ran the store as a privately owned business for many years.. It still stands as the main historical landmark in town, although it is currently abandoned.

== Geography ==
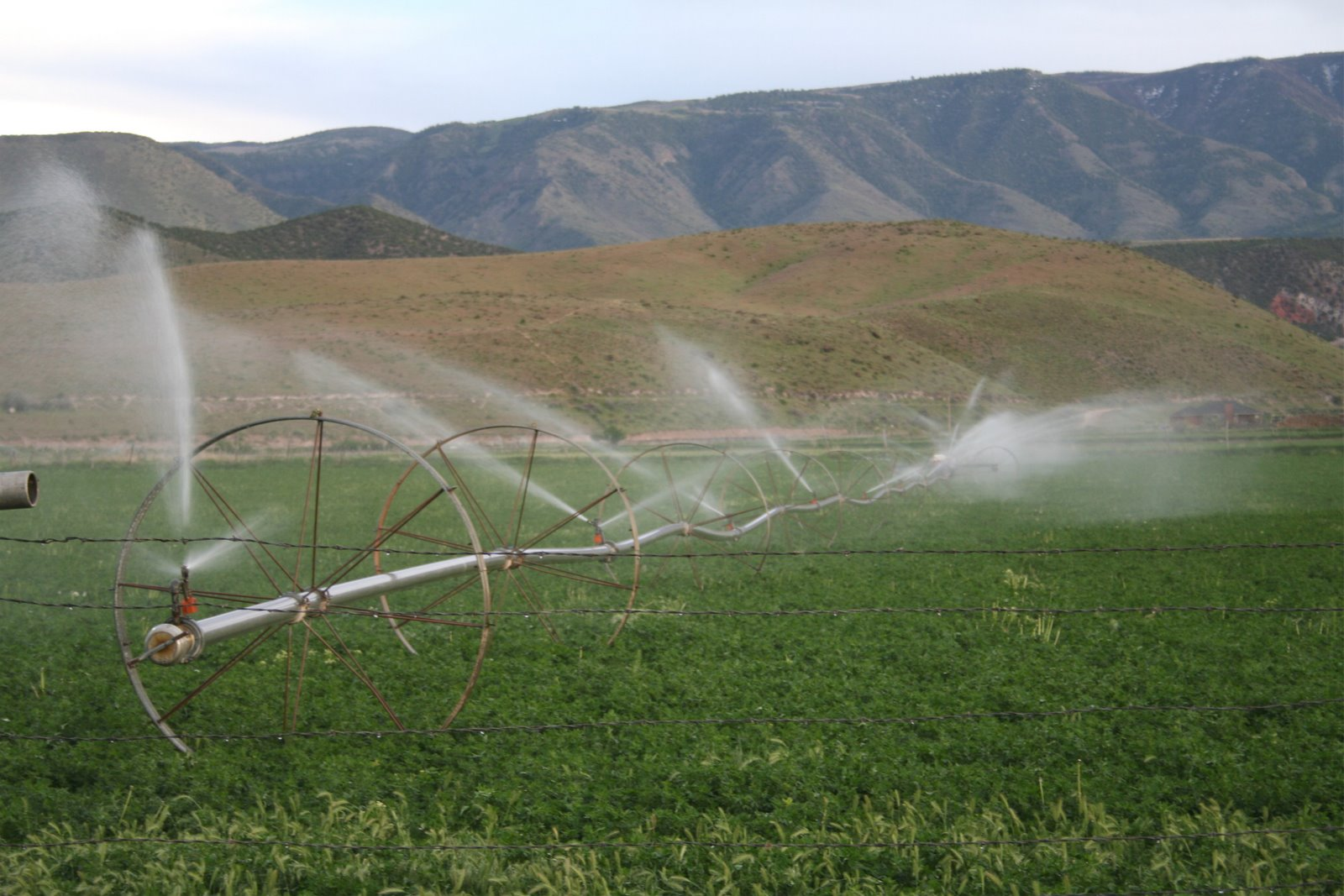

According to the United States Census Bureau, the town has a total area of 0.5 square mile (1.4 km^{2}), all land. The ZIP Code for the town is 84730.

The Mill Canyon-Sage Flat Watershed Project located in the drainage above Glenwood is designed to reduce flood damage in the area. Completed in 1959, this was the first project in the United States under the Watershed Protection and Flood Prevention Act. A major flood occurred during the final stages of completion, and residents claimed the project paid for itself by controlling this one flood.

=== Climate ===
Large seasonal temperature differences typify this climatic region, with warm to hot (and often humid) summers and cold (sometimes severely cold) winters. According to the Köppen Climate Classification system, Glenwood has a humid continental climate, abbreviated "Dfb" on climate maps.

== Demographics ==
Historical population
Census	Pop.	Note	%±
1880	462		—
1890	496		7.4%
1900	422		−14.9%
1910	359		−14.9%
1920	564		57.1%
1930	350		−37.9%
1940	385		10.0%
1950	338		−12.2%
1960	277		−18.0%
1970	212		−23.5%
1980	447		110.8%
1990	437		−2.2%
2000	437		0.0%
2010	464		6.2%
2020	474		2.2%
Source: U.S. Census Bureau

As of the census of 2000, there were 437 people, 140 households, and 120 families residing in the town. The population density was 813.1 people per square mile (312.5/km^{2}). There were 152 housing units at an average density of 282.8 per square mile (108.7/km^{2}). The racial makeup of the town was 98.40% White, 0.23% Native American, 0.69% Asian, 0.23% from other races, and 0.46% from two or more races. Hispanic or Latino of any race were 0.69% of the population.

There were 140 households, out of which 38.6% had children under 18 living with them, 82.9% were married couples living together, 3.6% had a female householder with no husband present, and 13.6% were non-families. 13.6% of all households were made up of individuals, and 8.6% had someone living alone who was 65 years or older. The average household size was 3.12, and the average family size was 3.44.

In the town, the population was spread out, with 30.9% under 18, 10.8% from 18 to 24, 18.8% from 25 to 44, 26.3% from 45 to 64, and 13.3% who were 65 years of age or older. The median age was 36 years. For every 100 females, there were 106.1 males. For every 100 females aged 18 and over, there were 105.4 males.

The median income for a household in the town was $45,192, and the median income for a family was $47,396. Males had a median income of $31,875 versus $19,286 for females. The per capita income for the town was $14,571. About 2.3% of families and 6.0% of the population were below the poverty line, including 4.2% of those under age 18 and 5.6% of those aged 65 or over.

Historically the town population has cycled, with a high of 564 in the 1920 Census, and a low of 212 in the 1970 Census.

== Notable people ==
- Art Acord (1890-1931), an American silent film actor and rodeo champion known as the "Mormon Cowboy", born in Prattville (small unincorporated community generally considered part of Glenwood, though not technically within the official city boundaries).
- Jacob Peter Anderson, a botanist who collected throughout Alaska from 1914 to 1940 while employed by the federal government. His collection of approximately 30,000 specimens is now housed in the University of Alaska Museum of the North. Mount Anderson (Alaska) is named for him. Born in Glenwood in 1874.
- Harvey Matusow, McCarthy era personality - town resident
- Ephraim P. Pectol, helped create the Capitol Reef National Park - born in Glenwood
- LeConte Stewart, a Mormon artist and former head of the Art Department at the University of Utah - born in Glenwood in 1891
- John Naisbitt, Author of Mindsets, Megatrends, and other literary works, remarked in the forward to Mindsets that he grew up in Glenwood, Utah

== See also ==
- National Register of Historic Places listings in Sevier County, Utah
- Richfield, Utah
- United Order
