= Monroe, Utah =

City in Utah, United States

Monroe
- City
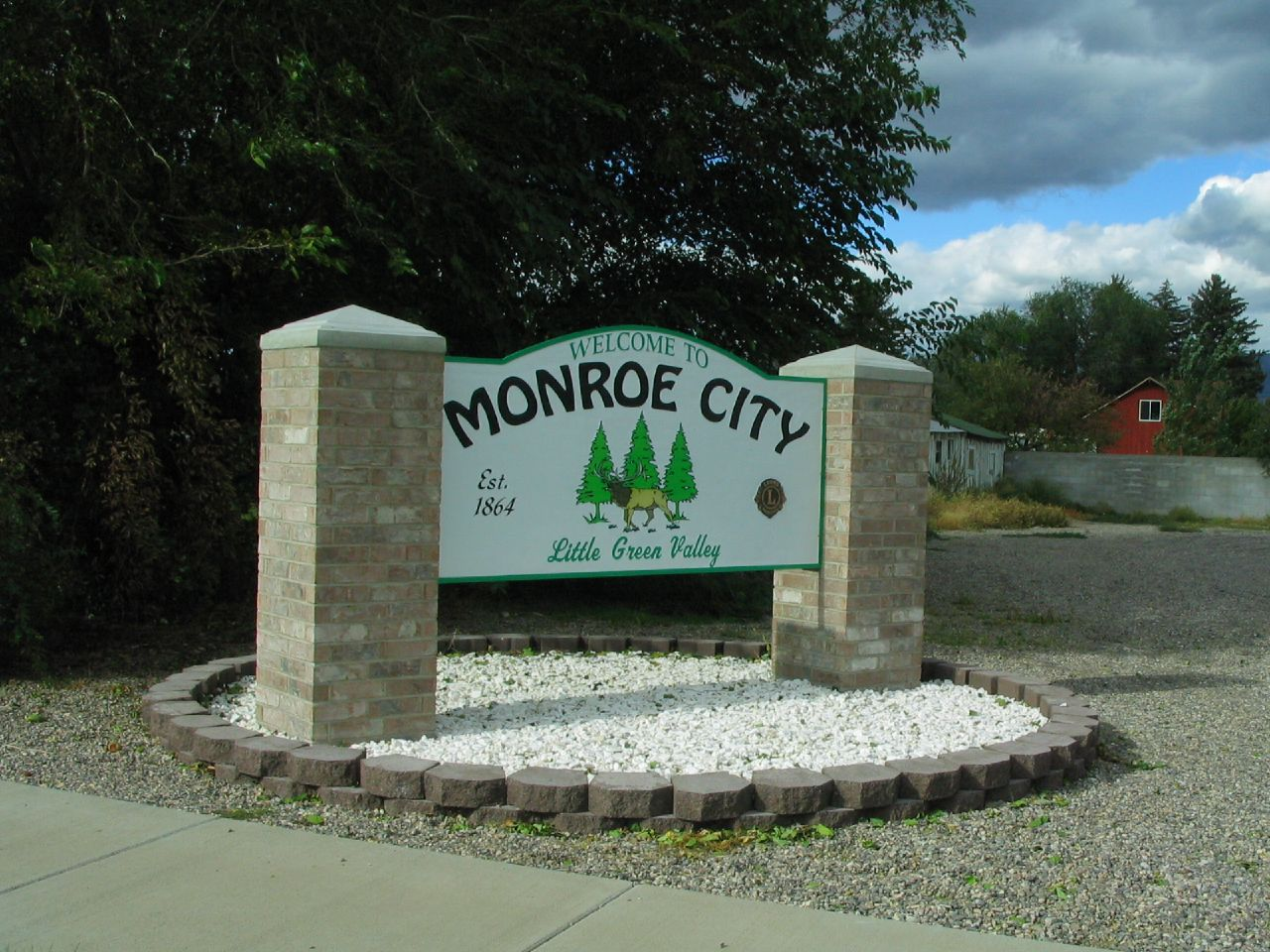
- Welcome sign at the northern entrance to Monroe

- Seal
- Nickname: The Little Green Valley
- Location in Sevier County and the state of Utah.
- Coordinates: 38°37′46″N 112°7′13″W
- Country: United States
- State: Utah
- County: Sevier
- Settled: 1864
- Incorporated: 1920
- Named for: James Monroe

Area
  - Total: 3.57 sq mi (9.25 km^{2})
  - Land: 3.57 sq mi (9.25 km^{2})
  - Water: 0 sq mi (0.00 km^{2})
- Elevation: 5,394 ft (1,644 m)

Population (2020)
  - Total: 2,515
  - Density: 660.4/sq mi (254.97/km^{2})
- Time zone: UTC-7 (Mountain (MST))
  - Summer (DST): UTC-6 (MDT)
- ZIP code: 84754
- Area code: 435
- FIPS code: 49-51360
- GNIS feature ID: 1443556
- Website: monroeut.gov

Monroe is a city in Sevier County, Utah, United States. The population was 2,515 at the 2020 United States Census.

== Geography ==
Monroe is located in rural central Utah. According to the United States Census Bureau, the city has a total area of 3.5 square miles (9.2 km^{2}), all land. Monroe is bordered by mountains on the east and south, and farmers' fields to the west and north.

Monroe is home to naturally occurring hot springs with travertine deposits, a result of the Monroe-Red Hill geothermal system found along the Sevier fault. On the east side of town, hot water surfaces at a temperature of 168 °F and a rate of about 200 gallons per minute. A travertine mound has formed, known as the Monroe Mound. This deposit stretches one mile across, 200 yards wide, and a few hundred feet thick. There is another hot water source about a mile north of town called the Red Hill Hot Springs. It also surfaces at 168 °F, but at a rate of about 100 gallons per minute. The Red Hill mound is about one-third of a mile across, and deep red in color.

== Demographics ==
Historical population
Census	Pop.	Note	%±
1880	744		—
1890	880		18.3%
1900	1,057		20.1%
1910	1,227		16.1%
1920	1,719		40.1%
1930	1,247		−27.5%
1940	1,292		3.6%
1950	1,214		−6.0%
1960	955		−21.3%
1970	918		−3.9%
1980	1,476		60.8%
1990	1,472		−0.3%
2000	1,845		25.3%
2010	2,256		22.3%
2020	2,515		11.5%
U.S. Decennial Census

=== 2020 census ===
As of the 2020 census, Monroe had a population of 2,515. The median age was 37.8 years. 29.5% of residents were under the age of 18 and 20.3% of residents were 65 years of age or older. For every 100 females there were 103.0 males, and for every 100 females age 18 and over there were 99.9 males age 18 and over.

0.0% of residents lived in urban areas, while 100.0% lived in rural areas.

There were 854 households in Monroe, of which 40.4% had children under the age of 18 living in them. Of all households, 64.4% were married-couple households, 13.6% were households with a male householder and no spouse or partner present, and 20.0% were households with a female householder and no spouse or partner present. About 19.8% of all households were made up of individuals and 14.6% had someone living alone who was 65 years of age or older.

There were 922 housing units, of which 7.4% were vacant. The homeowner vacancy rate was 1.0% and the rental vacancy rate was 7.1%.

Racial composition as of the 2020 census
Race	Number	Percent
White	2,322	92.3%
Black or African American	9	0.4%
American Indian and Alaska Native	23	0.9%
Asian	5	0.2%
Native Hawaiian and Other Pacific Islander	5	0.2%
Some other race	49	1.9%
Two or more races	102	4.1%
Hispanic or Latino (of any race)	108	4.3%

=== 2000 census ===
As of the 2000 census, there were 1,845 people, 707 households, and 480 families residing in the Monroe. The population density was 521.7 people per square mile (201.2/km^{2}). There were 707 housing units at an average density of 199.9 per square mile (77.1/km^{2}). The racial makeup of the city was 95.83% White, 0.22% African American, 1.41% Native American, 0.27% Asian, 0.11% Pacific Islander, 0.65% from other races, and 1.52% from two or more races. Hispanic or Latino of any race were 5.69% of the population.

There were 636 households, out of which 37.3% had children under the age of 18 living with them, 69.5% were married couples living together, 8.2% had a female householder with no husband present, and 19.5% were non-families. 18.4% of all households were made up of individuals, and 11.6% had someone living alone who was 65 years of age or older. The average household size was 2.90 and the average family size was 3.31.

In the city, the population was spread out, with 32.2% under the age of 18, 8.1% from 18 to 24, 21.2% from 25 to 44, 23.0% from 45 to 64, and 15.4% who were 65 years of age or older. The median age was 36 years. For every 100 females, there were 90.0 males. For every 100 females age 18 and over, there were 89.0 males.

The median income for a household in the city was $34,907, and the median income for a family was $37,415. Males had a median income of $31,797 versus $17,981 for females. The per capita income for the city was $14,331. About 5.0% of families and 7.7% of the population were below the poverty line, including 7.4% of those under age 18 and 8.1% of those age 65 or over.

== History ==
In late 1863, a few exploratory settlers came to Monroe including George Wilson, his son David, and two others who lived in a shelter near the center of modern-day Monroe. They were followed by the first permanent group of settlers, who arrived in Monroe on 20 February 1864. Most, if not all, of the first settlers were members of the Church of Jesus Christ of Latter-day Saints (LDS Church), who had immigrated to Utah. Four to five months before the first small group of men entered Monroe valley to begin settlement, an advanced team, also led by George Wilson, began to lay some foundation work to help prepare the settlement.

At first the town was called South Bend (due to the proximity to a bend in the Sevier River), but soon after its settlement it was renamed Alma, in honor of the Book of Mormon prophet. By late 1864, an estimated 20 families were living in Alma. They spent the first year building small homes and dugouts, along with clearing space for fields and pastures.

Mormons settling first in the Salt Lake Valley did not provoke the Native Americans to war, but further settlement outside of Salt Lake led to conflicts and Native Americans were often pushed back into the mountains. In April 1865, the Black Hawk War broke out between local Native Americans and the LDS settlers of both the Sevier and Sanpete counties. The war drastically ended the progress which was being made in creating farms and homes in and around Alma. On the night of 21 April 1866, Walter Barney and Sidney Robinson were on guard watching the public corral when they spotted something lying on the fence when making their nightly rounds. When approached, they realized that it was two Native Americans. After chasing them away, they went back to the fence and realized they had been digging around the poles to break the boundary around the corral.

Alma had been unwittingly settled in the middle of Native Americans’ traditional hunting grounds, and as a result they started to go hungry. During the war Native Americans were constantly trying to steal the settlers' stock for food, and they were successful during several raids.

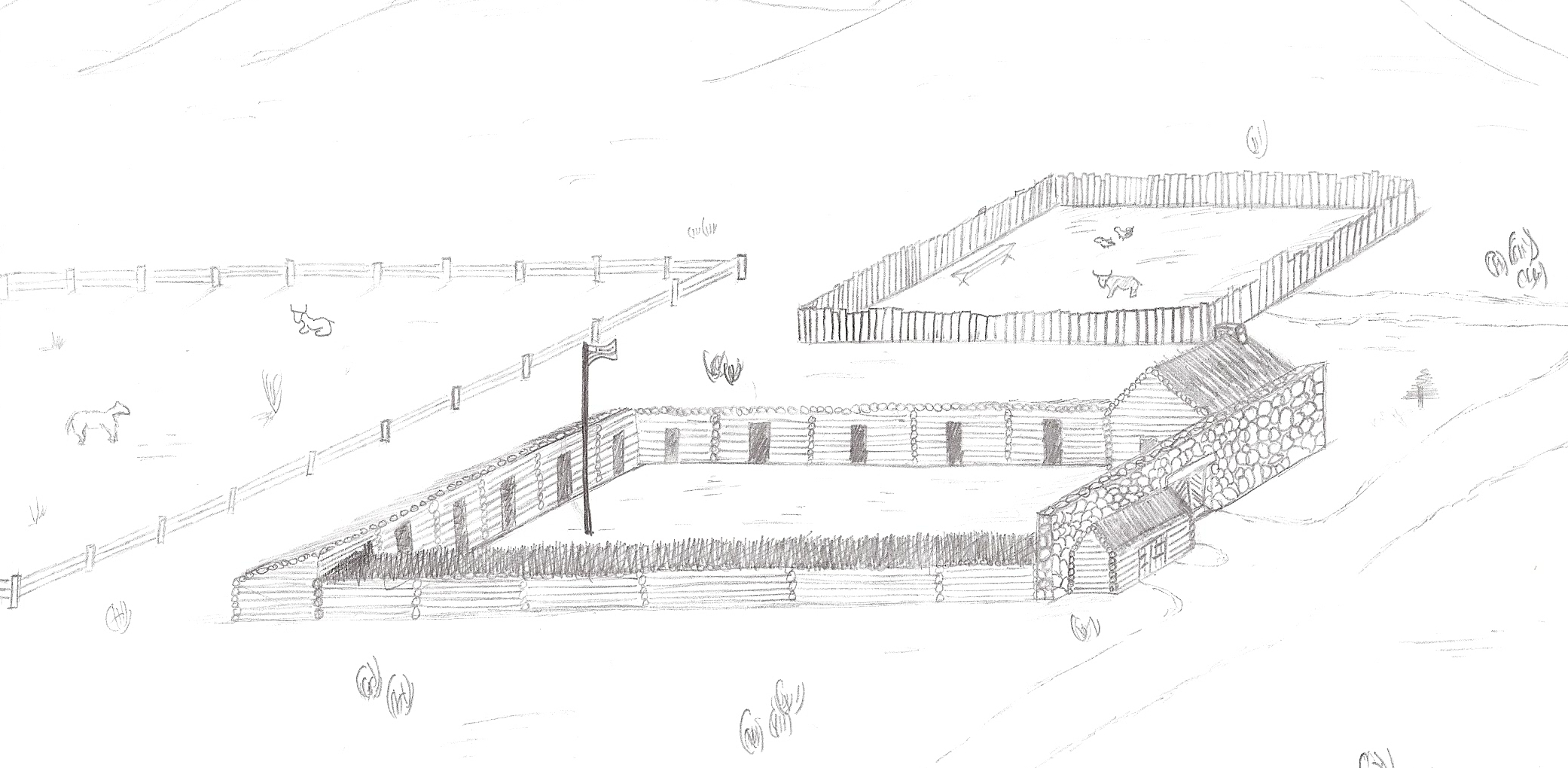
An artist's interpretation of what Fort Alma may have looked like.

Sometime during 1865, work began on a fort to provide protection for both the settlers and their stock. The fort was completed and contained several homes, a blacksmith shop, along with a corral and stockyard for the animals. Dubbed Fort Alma, the structure provided protection for about two years, but things continued to get more dangerous and in April 1867 the residents of Alma were evacuated. Most of the evacuees made temporary homes in nearby Sanpete County.

An attempt to resettle Alma was made during 1868, but the settlers ran into Native Americans near Cedar Ridge (now Vermillion, Utah) and a battle ensued. They were unsuccessful in resettling Alma, and it was not until March 1871 that Alma was reoccupied. The following year the residents applied for a Post Office under the city name of Monroe, in honor of U.S. President James Monroe. By the end of 1872 the electric telegraph had been extended through Monroe, which connected it with the rest of Utah. In 1889, Monroe was incorporated as a town and remained that way until 1921, when it was incorporated as a city.

In 1882, Thomas Cooper and his wife homesteaded the area on the east side of town where hot springs water emerged. They built a wood box to collect the water and offered it as a soaking pool. Later, around 1905, a building was erected. There was a dance floor, an indoor swimming pool, and many dressing rooms. Many people came from miles around by horse and buggy to enjoy soaking and dancing. In 1930 Farnsworth bought the hot springs. He was the leader of a band, and it became the house band. The slogan for the Monroe hot springs was, "the home of mirth and merriment". The hot springs enjoyed many years of prosperity until around 1950. It was revitalized in the 1970s. The name was changed to Mystic Hot Springs in 1995.

=== Present day ===
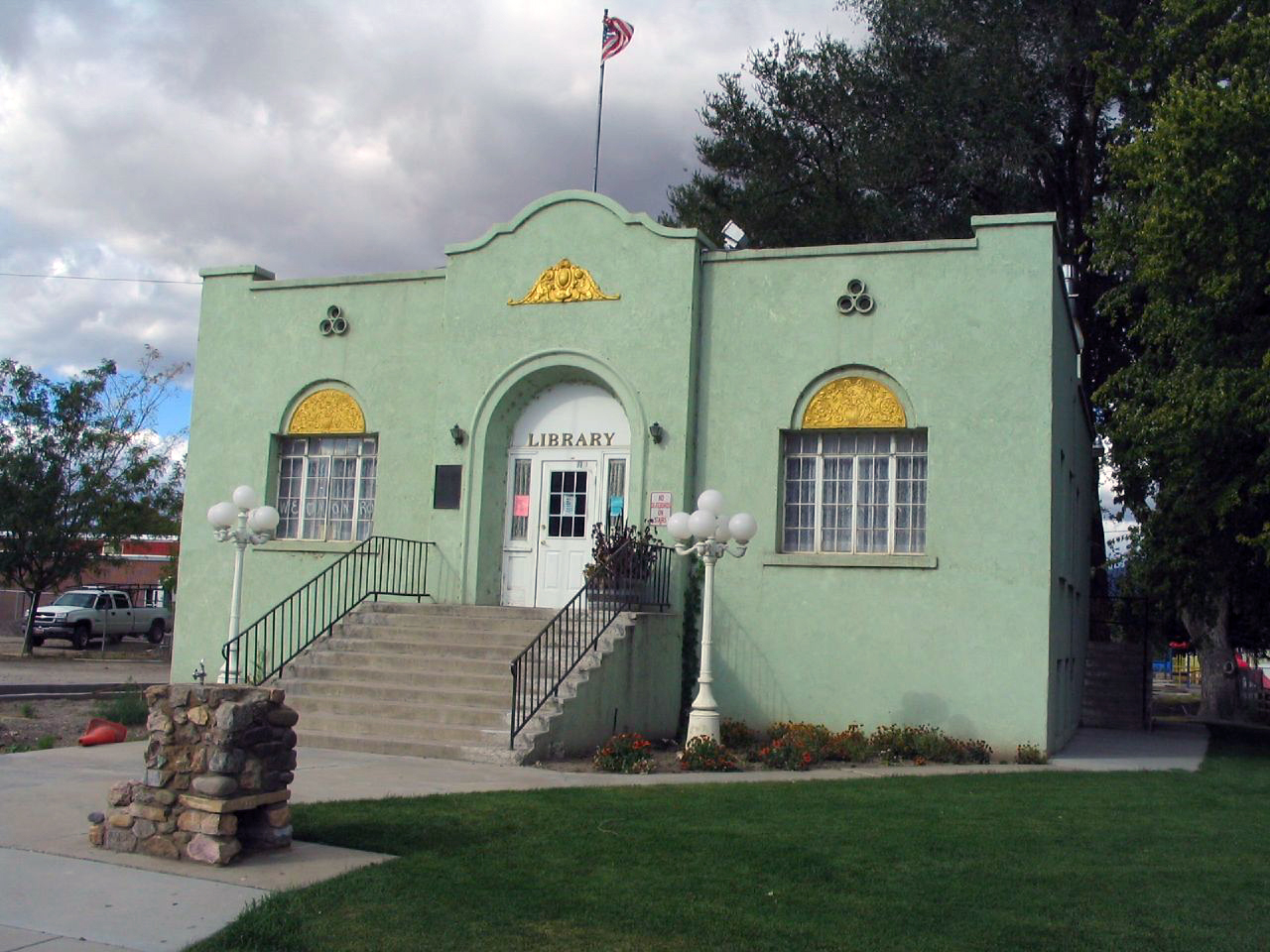
Monroe City Library

Monroe and the surrounding region are nicknamed "The Little Green Valley" due to the many fields that surround the city.

== Education ==
The schools for most of the surrounding areas are also located in Monroe, which has Monroe Elementary (K-5), South Sevier Middle School (6-8), and South Sevier High School (9-12). School-age children are traditionally bused from the neighboring towns of Central Valley, Annabella, Elsinore, Joseph, and Sevier to Monroe to attend school. Navajo placement students are also traditionally bused to the schools from a dormitory in Richfield.

== LDS Chapel 2024 New Year's Eve carbon monoxide poisoning ==
Over 50 Latter-Day Saint churchgoers were reported to be sickened from carbon monoxide poisoning at the LDS Monroe East chapel of the Church of Jesus Christ of Latter Day Saints in Sevier County, Utah, on December 31, 2023, New Year's Eve, as reported by the Sevier County Sheriff’s office. The sheriff reported they were transported to a local hospital for treatment. It was determined that the heating system malfunctioned, causing a release of carbon monoxide into the chapel, where services were being held. Carbon monoxide poisoning at the Monroe Latter-day Saint chapel in Utah led to 22 hospitalizations on Sunday, and 54 people experienced symptoms of poisoning, and 49 were treated.

The local fire department checked the building for carbon monoxide, and high levels were discovered and the building was evacuated. Members who re-entered the building continued to experience poisoning symptoms and were transported for medical care. 22 individuals required hospitalization and 10 ambulance transports were required to evacuate victims to a local hospital that had a hyperbaric chamber that could treat the patients. The church made a public statement that the building would be checked and the heating system repaired.

== Notable people ==
- B.F. Larsen – artist
- Ralph Okerlund — state senator

== See also ==
- Fremont Indian State Park
