= Elsinore, Utah =

Town in the state of Utah, United States

- Town
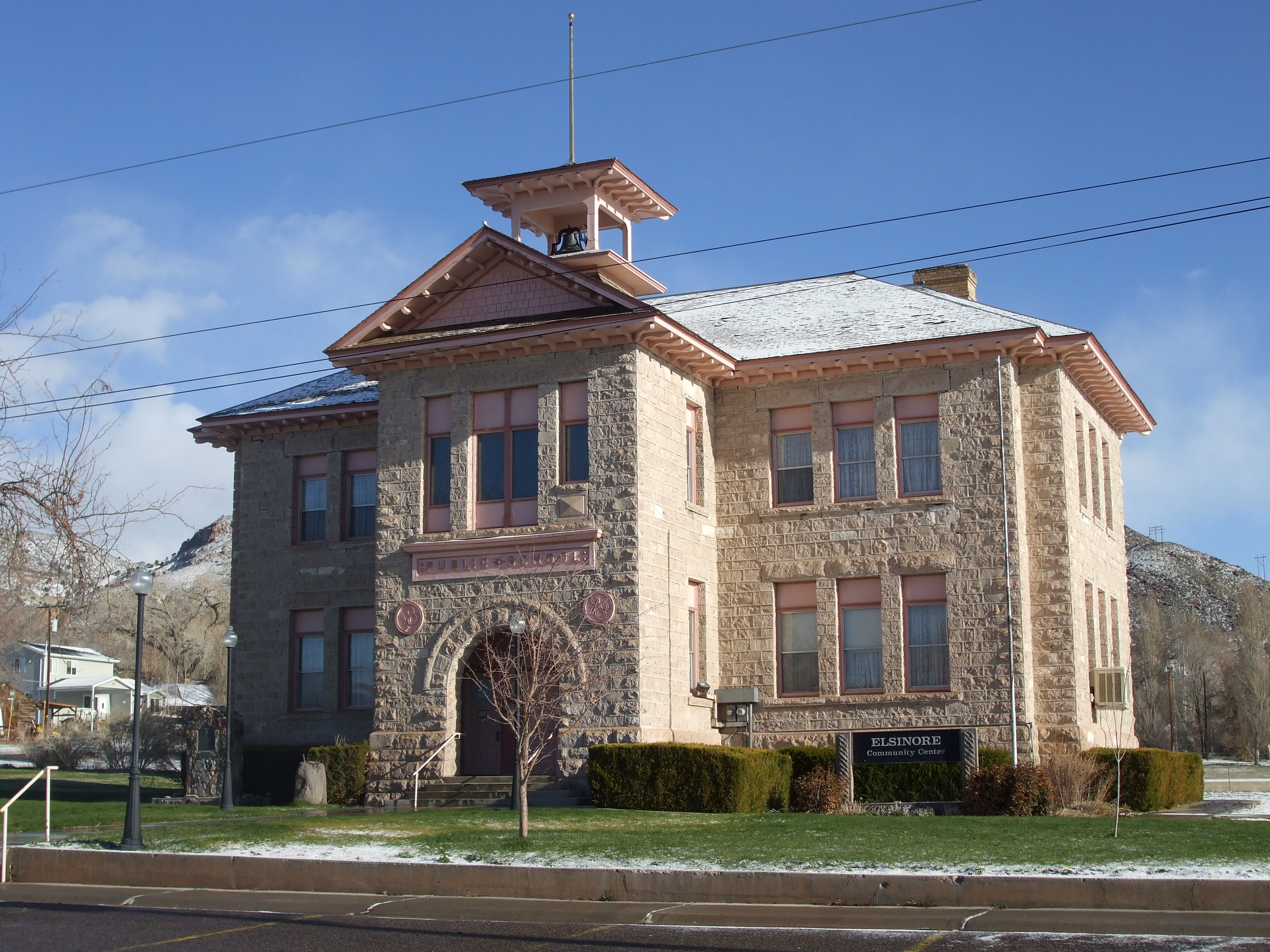
- Elsinore's old White Rock Schoolhouse
- Nickname: Little Denmark
- Location in Sevier County and the state of Utah.
- Coordinates: 38°41′4″N 112°8′51″W
- Country: United States
- State: Utah
- County: Sevier
- Settled: 1874
- Named for: Elsinore

Area
  - Total: 1.34 sq mi (3.46 km^{2})
  - Land: 1.34 sq mi (3.46 km^{2})
  - Water: 0 sq mi (0.00 km^{2})
- Elevation: 5,351 ft (1,631 m)

Population (2020)
  - Total: 802
  - Density: 660.5/sq mi (255.01/km^{2})
- Time zone: UTC-7 (Mountain (MST))
  - Summer (DST): UTC-6 (MDT)
- ZIP code: 84724
- Area code: 435
- FIPS code: 49-22650
- GNIS feature ID: 1440921
- Website: www.elsinoreut.com

Elsinore is a town in Sevier County, Utah, United States. The population was 802 at the 2020 census.

== History ==
The community was first settled in the spring of 1874 by James C. Jensen, Jens Iver Jensen, and others. The area was settled by Danish converts to the Church of Jesus Christ of Latter-day Saints, and named after Kronborg Castle, known as Elsinore in Hamlet. Helsingør, the city where Kronborg Castle is located, is classically known as Elsinore as well.

The first passenger train arrived on July 21, 1896, from the Denver & Rio Grande Railroad.

Elsinore was home to a Utah-Idaho Sugar Company factory for processing sugar beets into sugar from 1911 to 1929, but was closed due to a sugar beet blight.

On September 29 and October 1, 1921, Elsinore was hit by a series of magnitude six earthquakes. Some buildings were damaged, and residents were frightened from their homes, but no deaths were reported.

== Geography ==
According to the United States Census Bureau, the town has a total area of 1.3 square miles (3.3 km^{2}), all land.

== Demographics ==
Historical population
Census	Pop.	Note	%±
1880	223		—
1890	590		164.6%
1900	625		5.9%
1910	656		5.0%
1920	843		28.5%
1930	654		−22.4%
1940	674		3.1%
1950	657		−2.5%
1960	483		−26.5%
1970	357		−26.1%
1980	612		71.4%
1990	608		−0.7%
2000	733		20.6%
2010	847		15.6%
2020	802		−5.3%
U.S. Decennial Census

As of the census of 2000, there were 733 people, 261 households, and 196 families residing in the town. The population density was 581.8 people per square mile (224.6/km^{2}). There were 287 housing units at an average density of 227.8 per square mile (87.9/km^{2}). The racial makeup of the town was 95.50% White, 0.14% African American, 1.36% Native American, 0.27% Asian, 0.95% from other races, and 1.77% from two or more races. Hispanic or Latino of any race were 2.59% of the population.

There were 261 households, out of which 40.6% had children under 18 living with them, 59.8% were married couples living together, 13.0% had a female householder with no husband present, and 24.9% were non-families. 23.4% of all households were made up of individuals, and 13.4% had someone living alone who was 65 years or older. The average household size was 2.81, and the average family size was 3.33.

In the town, the population was spread out, with 33.4% under 18, 10.4% from 18 to 24, 23.2% from 25 to 44, 19.6% from 45 to 64, and 13.4% who were 65 years of age or older. The median age was 30 years. For every 100 females, there were 88.9 males. For every 100 females aged 18 and over, there were 85.6 males.

The median income for a household in the town was $27,917, and the median income for a family was $36,250. Males had a median income of $30,208 versus $16,705 for females. The per capita income for the town was $12,523. About 16.2% of families and 20.5% of the population were below the poverty line, including 30.3% of those under age 18 and 10.2% of those aged 65 or over.

== Library ==
In 1980, 10-year-old Jason Hardman petitioned Elsinore's mayor for permission to open a library. The library was initially set up in the basement of the town's public school (the historic town hall building), with 1,000 books. Hardman became the librarian, making him the youngest librarian in the United States. By 1982, the library had 10,000 volumes, largely from donations. By 1985, it had 17,000 volumes.

The Elsinore Town Library is a member of the Beehive Library Consortium.

== See also ==
- National Register of Historic Places listings in Sevier County, Utah
- Utah State Library

== Staples Art Center ==
The town also has a small art gallery and gift shop to support area artists. One of the founding members, Sue Ann Staples Brady, named it for her great-great-grandfather, George Staples, whose work with Native American tribes was instrumental in its founding.
