= Redmond, Utah =

Town in the state of Utah, United States

- Town
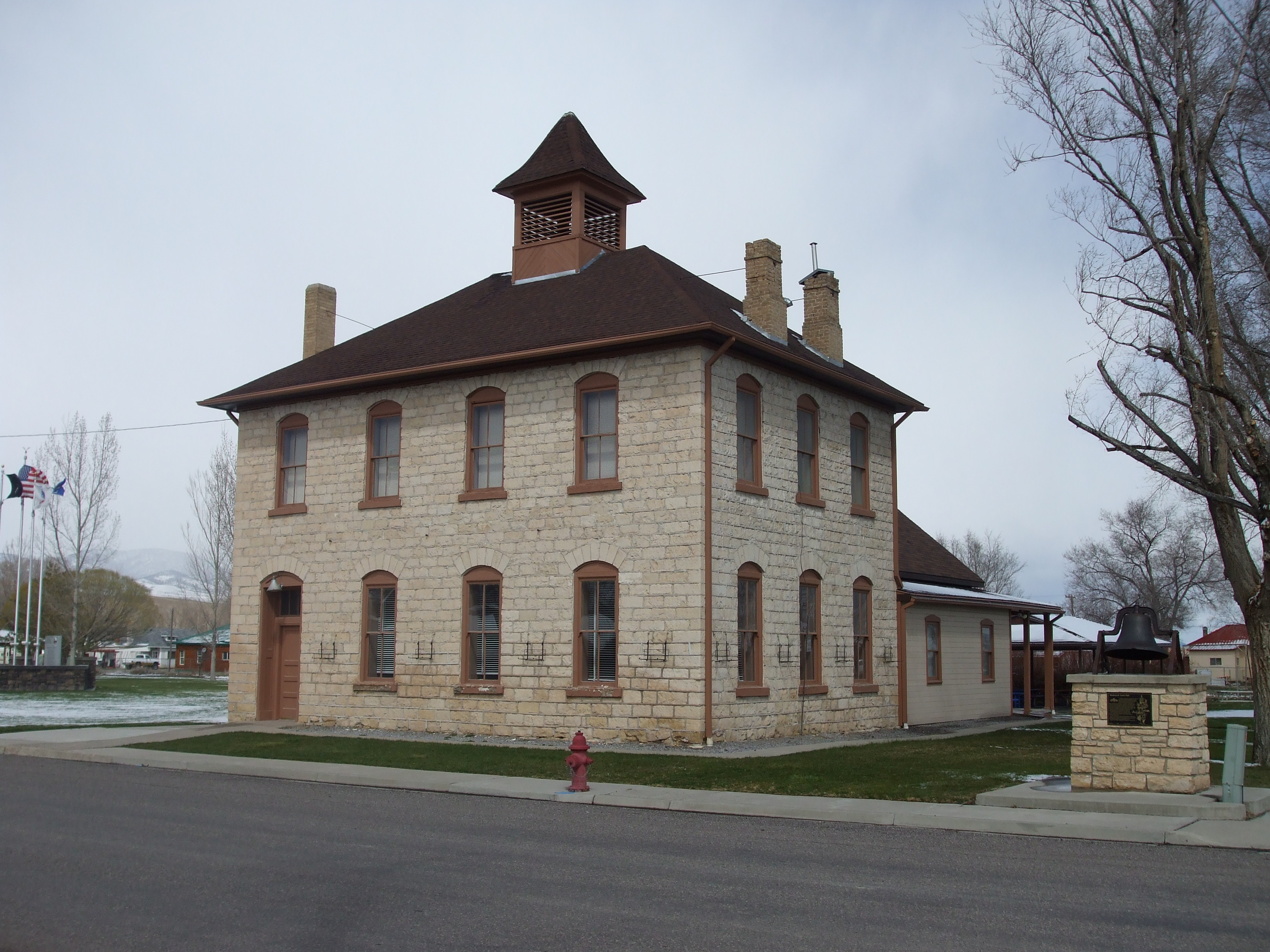
- The old Redmond Town Hall

- Location in Sevier County and the state of Utah.
- Coordinates: 39°0′19″N 111°52′2″W
- Country: United States
- State: Utah
- County: Sevier

Area
  - Total: 0.96 sq mi (2.48 km^{2})
  - Land: 0.94 sq mi (2.43 km^{2})
  - Water: 0.019 sq mi (0.05 km^{2})
- Elevation: 5,105 ft (1,556 m)

Population (2020)
  - Total: 762
  - Density: 795.6/sq mi (307.18/km^{2})
- Time zone: UTC-7 (Mountain (MST))
  - Summer (DST): UTC-6 (MDT)
- ZIP code: 84652
- Area code: 435
- FIPS code: 49-63240
- GNIS feature ID: 1444843

Redmond is a town in Sevier County, Utah, United States. The population was 762 at the 2020 census. Redmond was first settled in 1876, and named for red mounds to the west of the town.

== Geography ==
According to the United States Census Bureau, the town has a total area of 1.0 square miles (2.6 km^{2}), of which 1.0 square mile (2.5 km^{2}) is land and 0.04 square mile (0.1 km^{2}) (2.02%) is water.

=== Climate ===
This climatic region is typified by large seasonal temperature differences, with warm to hot (and often humid) summers and cold (sometimes severely cold) winters. According to the Köppen Climate Classification system, Redmond has a humid continental climate, abbreviated "Dfb" on climate maps.

== Demographics ==
Historical population
Census	Pop.	Note	%±
1880	158		—
1890	322		103.8%
1900	451		40.1%
1910	547		21.3%
1920	649		18.6%
1930	577		−11.1%
1940	641		11.1%
1950	600		−6.4%
1960	413		−31.2%
1970	409		−1.0%
1980	619		51.3%
1990	648		4.7%
2000	788		21.6%
2010	730		−7.4%
2020	762		4.4%
U.S. Decennial Census

As of the census of 2000, there were 788 people, 243 households, and 202 families residing in the town. The population density was 812.6 people per square mile (313.7/km^{2}). There were 262 housing units at an average density of 270.2 per square mile (104.3/km^{2}). The racial makeup of the town was 98.22% White, 0.13% African American, 0.13% Asian, 1.14% from other races, and 0.38% from two or more races. Hispanic or Latino of any race were 1.90% of the population.

There were 243 households, out of which 46.9% had children under the age of 18 living with them, 74.9% were married couples living together, 5.8% had a female householder with no husband present, and 16.5% were non-families. 14.8% of all households were made up of individuals, and 7.0% had someone living alone who was 65 years of age or older. The average household size was 3.24 and the average family size was 3.64.

In the town, the population was spread out, with 36.4% under the age of 18, 9.9% from 18 to 24, 26.0% from 25 to 44, 17.6% from 45 to 64, and 10.0% who were 65 years of age or older. The median age was 28 years. For every 100 females, there were 99.5 males. For every 100 females age 18 and over, there were 102.0 males.

The median income for a household in the town was $40,313, and the median income for a family was $41,875. Males had a median income of $36,250 versus $19,375 for females. The per capita income for the town was $12,620. About 12.5% of families and 12.3% of the population were below the poverty line, including 14.8% of those under age 18 and 4.3% of those age 65 or over.

== Economy ==
Rock salt, which is pink in color, is mined near Redmond, and sold by Redmond Life as Real Salt.
