= List of citadels =

This is a list of citadels from around the world.

See also List of forts, List of fortifications and List of castles.

- Herat Citadel, Afghanistan
- Citadel of Ghazni, Afghanistan
- Antwerp Citadel, Belgium (demolished)
- Citadel of Dinant, Belgium
- Citadel of Huy, Belgium
- Citadel of Liège, Belgium (partially demolished)
- Citadel of Namur, Belgium
- Citadel Počitelj, Bosnia and Herzegovina
- Halifax Citadel, Canada
- Citadelle of Quebec, Canada
- Vyšehrad, Czech Republic
- Špilberk Castle, Czech Republic
- Kastellet, Copenhagen, Denmark
- Cairo Citadel, Egypt
- Citadelle d'Ajaccio, France
- Citadel of Amiens, France
- Citadel of Arras, France
- Citadel of Belfort, France
- Citadel of Belle-Île-en-Mer, France
- Citadel of Besançon, France
- Citadel of Bitche, France
- Citadel of Brouage, France
- Citadel of Calais, France
- Citadel of Entrevaux, France
- Citadel of Lille, France
- Citadel of Mont-Louis, France
- Citadel of Saint-Tropez, France
- Citadel of Sisteron, France
- Mainz Citadel, Germany
- Petersberg Citadel, Germany
- Spandau Citadel, Germany
- Acropolis of Athens, Greece
- Citadelle Laferrière, Haiti
- Citadella, Hungary
- Citadel Prins Frederik, Indonesia (demolished)
- Cittadella, Italy
- Bam Citadel, Iran
- Citadel of Bashtabia, Iraq (ruins)
- Amedi Citadel, Iraq
- Citadel of Baghdad, Iraq (demolished 1932)
- Kirkuk Citadel, Iraq
- Citadel of Erbil, Iraq (partially ruined)
- Tal Afar Citadel, Iraq (Partially demolished)
- Jerusalem Citadel or Tower of David, Israel
- Amman Citadel, Amman, Jordan
- Cittadella (Gozo), Malta
- Citadel of 's-Hertogenbosch, the Netherlands
- Intramuros, Philippines
- Warsaw Citadel, Poland
- Peter and Paul Fortress, Russia
- Landskrona Citadel, Sweden
- Citadel of Aleppo, Syria (partly destroyed, being rebuilt)
- Citadel of Salah Ed-Din, Syria (partially ruined)
- Verne Citadel, United Kingdom
- Royal Citadel, Plymouth, United Kingdom
- Ark of Bukhara, Uzbekistan
- Konya Ark, Khiva, Uzbekistan
