= List of public art in Corse-du-Sud =

This is a non-exhaustive list of public art in Corse-du-Sud, a department of France.

== List ==
Work	Artist	Commune	Location / Address	Date	Coordinates	Image	Ref.
Memorial to General Abbatucci	Vital Gabriel Dubray	Ajaccio	Place Abbatucci	1854	41.925442°N 8.738361°E	—	
Fontaine des quatre lions	Jérôme Maglioli	Ajaccio	Place du Maréchal-Foch	5 May 1850	41.918856°N 8.738297°E		
Bust of Pierre Griffi	Noël Bonardi	Ajaccio	—	2003	41.9268°N 8.739°E	—	
Bust of Pierre Lelong	—	Ajaccio	Citadel (entrance)	—	41.9165°N 8.7392°E		
Bust of Sylvestre Marcaggi	—	Ajaccio	Boulevard Sylvestre-Marcaggi	1926	41.9166°N 8.7315°E		
Statue of Joseph Fesch	Vital Gabriel Dubray	Ajaccio	Courtyard of the Palais Fesch	1856	41.921859°N 8.738392°E		
Place d'Austerlitz Napoleon Monument	—	Ajaccio	Place d'Austerlitz	1938	41.9165°N 8.7249°E		
Statue of Napoleon	Francesco Massimiliano Laboureur	Ajaccio	Place du Maréchal-Foch	5 May 1850	41.918856°N 8.738297°E		
Statue of General Paul François Grossetti	—	Ajaccio	Place Grossetti	—	41.913306°N 8.728676°E		
Bust of Pasquale Paoli	—	Ajaccio	Place Paul Vittori	5 July 2013	41.917400°N 8.739740°E		
Statue of Sampiero Corso	Vital Gabriel Dubray	Bastelica	—	1890	42.0009°N 9.0498°E		
Statue of Christ the King	Noël Bonardi	Évisa	Col de Vergio	—	42.290657°N 8.878424°E		
Bust of Célestin Caïtucoli	—	Sollacaro	—	—	—		
Bust of Pasquale Paoli	—	Sartène	—	—	—		
Bust of Pasquale Paoli	—	Porto-Vecchio	Quai Pasquale Paoli	16 June 2014	—	—	
Bust of Jean Nicoli	Noël Bonardi	Carbini	—	—	—	—	
Bust of Michel Bozzi	Noël Bonardi	Coti-Chiavari	—	—	41.772939°N 8.771805°E		
Bust of Fiorello Ceccaldi	—	Évisa	—	1963	42.2536°N 8.8023°E	—	
Memorial to Jean-Toussaint Fieschi	Pierre Dionisi	Petreto-Bicchisano	—	1957	41.7855°N 8.9768°E	—	
Dolphin Ballet	Noël Bonardi	Pianottoli-Caldarello	—	—	41.4918°N 9.0551°E	—	

== See also ==
- List of public art in Haute-Corse
