= Siege of Huy (1595) =

1595 battle during the Eighty Years' War

- Part of the Eighty Years' War, the Luxemburg campaigns and the Anglo-Spanish War (1585–1604)
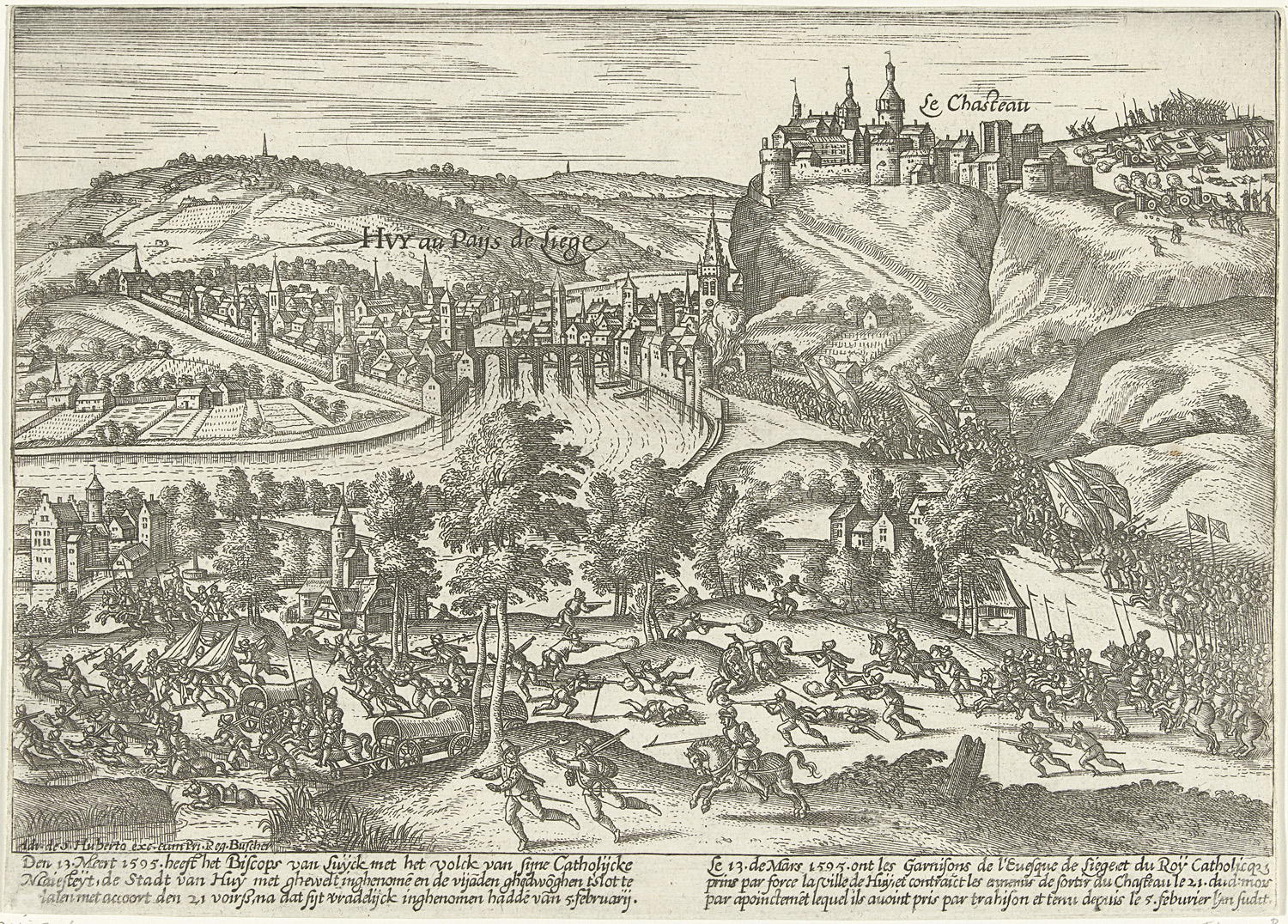
- Engraving Siege of Huy by Frans Hogenberg. Collection Rijksmuseum Amsterdam.
Date	March 7–20, 1595
Location	Huy, Prince-Bishopric of Liège (present-day Belgium)
Result	Spanish victory

Belligerents
Dutch Republic; England	(Spain) Spanish Empire

Commanders and leaders
Charles de Héraugière	Baron de la Motte

Strength
1,800	Unknown

The siege of Huy of 1595, also known as the assault of Huy, took place between 7 and 20 March 1595, at Huy in the Prince-Bishopric of Liège, as part of the Eighty Years' War and the Anglo-Spanish War (1585–1604), despite the neutrality of Liège in the conflict. It concluded in a Spanish victory.

== Capture ==
Despite the promises of Prince Maurice of Orange to relieve Huy, the forces of the new Governor-General of the Spanish Netherlands, Don Pedro Henriquez de Acevedo, Count of Fuentes, led by Don Valentín Pardieu de la Motte, after a short siege and low resistance, captured the town and the Citadel of Huy from the combined Protestant troops of Charles de Héraugière. Thirteen days later, on March 20, Héraugière, unable to keep the defense, agreed to terms of capitulation between the Protestant forces and the Spaniards.

The Spanish forces were composed of two Spanish tercios led by Don Luis de Velasco and Don Antonio de Zúñiga, two German regiments, three Walloon regiments, and some pieces of artillery. The majority of the Protestant forces were composed of Dutch troops, about 1,800 infantry and cavalry, which included a regiment of Scots commanded by General Barthold Balfour, and a contingent of Huguenots.

== Abuses ==
Although Huy was declared neutral in the war during the occupation by the forces of Héraugière, the population endured great abuses by the Protestant soldiers. Several churches and many houses were looted. The Spanish forces retired on March 23, leaving the citadel of Huy in the hands of Captain Juan de Zornoza and 150 Spanish soldiers, until repair of the batteries and the return of the garrison of the Prince-Elector, Ernest of Bavaria.

The occupation of Huy by the United Provinces, and consequently the violation of the rights of neutral zones, was the failure of a plan by Philip of Nassau for control of an advantageous position from which to open a short route and aid the operations of the French troops commanded by the Duke of Bouillon in the borders of Luxembourg.

== See also ==
- Siege of Groenlo (1595)
- Siege of Le Catelet (1595)
- Ernest of Bavaria
- Prince-Bishopric of Liège
- List of governors of the Spanish Netherlands
