= Meuse Citadels =

Group of forts along the Meuse river in Belgium

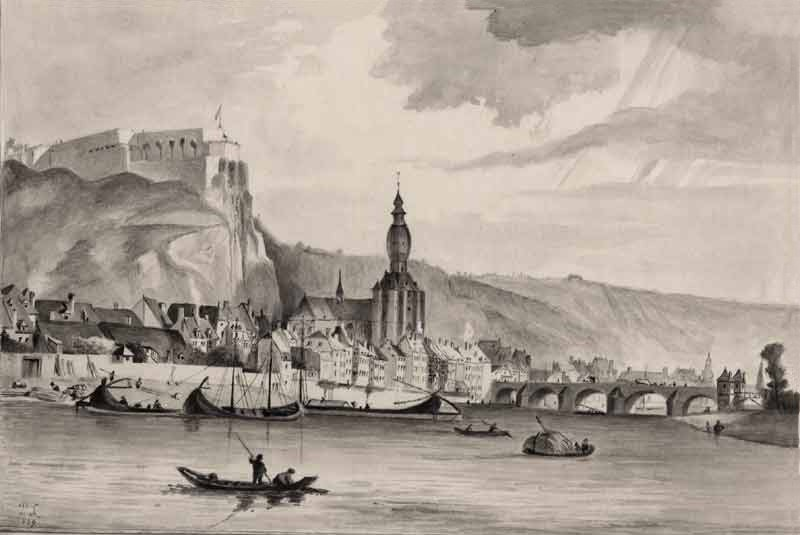
19th-century depiction of Dinant, with its citadel situated on the hill overlooking the town and river

The Meuse citadels or Mosane citadels (French: Citadelles mosanes) are a group of forts situated along the Meuse river in southern Belgian region of Wallonia. The citadels were originally intended to defend the Prince-Bishopric of Liège and County of Namur and were later modernized during the periods of French and Dutch rule. They include four citadels, at Namur, Liège, Huy and Dinant, all of which are partially or totally preserved.

== List of citadels ==
Picture	Citadel	Description
	Citadel of Namur; 50°27′38″N 4°51′50″E	Open to the public.
	Citadel of Huy; 50°31′02″N 5°14′14″E	Open to the public. Used as a camp to house political prisoners during the German occupation of Belgium during World War II.
	Citadel of Liège; 50°39′07″N 5°34′41″E	A large part of the Liège citadel was demolished in the 1970s to make way for a hospital.
	Citadel of Dinant; 50°15′42″N 4°54′47″E	Open to the public.

== UNESCO proposal ==
On 8 April 2008, the citadels of Dinant, Namur and Huy were officially proposed as candidates to be UNESCO World Heritage Sites under the reference number 5365. After discussions, it was decided to propose Namur alone, possibly in combination with Dinant.

== See also ==
- Fort de Charlemont, Givet
