= René Boutegourd =

French general (1858–1932)

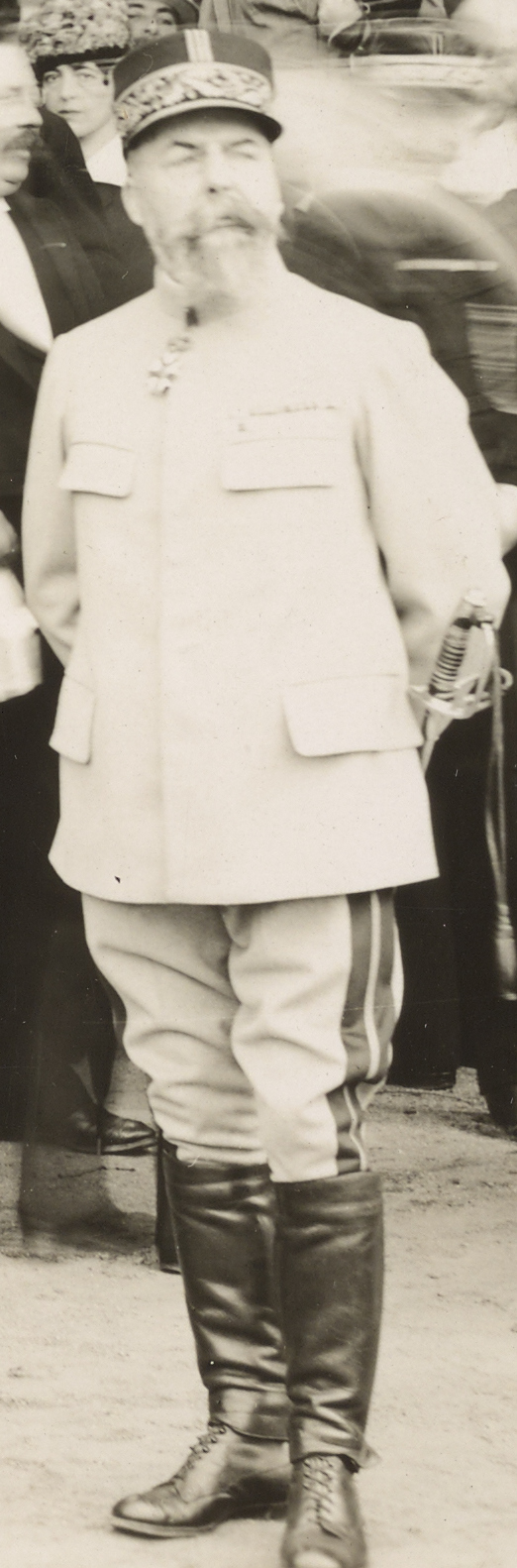
- Boutegourd at Tours in July 1918
- Born: 20 September 1858; Lambézellec, Finistère, France
- Died: 3 April 1932 (aged 73); Brest, Finistère, France
- Alma mater: École spéciale militaire de Saint-Cyr
- Military career
- Allegiance: France
- Branch: French Army
- Service years: 1876 – 1919
- Rank: Général de Brigade
- Commands: 1st Foreign Regiment; 51st Reserve Division
- Conflicts: World War I: Battle of the Frontiers; Battle of Dinant; Retreat to the Marne; First Battle of the Marne

René Auguste Émile Boutegourd (1858-1932) was a French brigadier general of World War I. He commanded the 51st Reserve Division throughout the war, notably leading the division at the First Battle of the Marne.

== Family ==
René Boutegourd was born in Lambézellec on 20 September 1858. His father, Jean-Baptiste Boutegourd was a native of Landunvez, had a brilliant career in the Imperial French Navy, a master gunner for line crews, military medalist, and a knight of the Legion of Honor. His grandfather was a recipient of the Saint Helena Medal. His mother was Françoise Bernicot, who was a native of Lambézellec, with her parents coming from Landéda and Bourg-Blanc. René's three brothers and sister died in infancy.

== Early military career ==
Inspired by family tradition, René chose a military career, but unlike his father, he joined the French Army. He enlisted at the age of 18 in Brest in the 2nd Marine Infantry Regiment, which in 1901 became the 2nd Colonial Infantry Regiment. Boutegourd was promoted to corporal on 3 April 1877, with enough ambition to study at the École spéciale militaire de Saint-Cyr the same year, from which he graduated as second lieutenant on 10 October 1879. He was promoted to lieutenant in 1882.

== Cochinchina Campaigns ==
At the beginning of the 1880s, Cochinchina was a French possession where the indigenous population retained a certain autonomy. During these years, France sought to consolidate its positions more deeply towards the interior of the country which would form the future French Indochina, which caused the French to enlist marine regiments to expand further inland. It was therefore with the 2nd Marine Infantry Regiment that he distinguished himself in the Far East between 1881 and 1886, notably by leading a column in Cambodia. In 1883, he was a lieutenant in the regiment of Tirailleurs indochinois.

He was then promoted to captain on 18 April 1885, but was wounded in action on 14 December. During the years 1886–1887, he was still in Cochinchina with the 2nd Marine Infantry Regiment. In 1890, he was transferred to Senegal to the general staff, attached to the 3rd Marine Infantry Regiment. He was made a Knight of the Legion of Honor on 20 December 1886, and an Officer of the Royal Order of Cambodia on 25 July 1887, with the latter personally awarded by King Norodom of Cambodia. Boutegourd also received the Tonkin Expedition commemorative medal during this period.

== African Colonial Campaigns ==
He then served in Dahomey during the First Franco-Dahomean War as a member of the French chief of staff. At the end of the 19th century, the great European powers participated in the Scramble for Africa. The armies met the resistance of the indigenous populations, with the French colonial infantry engaging in these confrontations. From 1890 to 1891 he was sent and transferred to Algeria with the 3rd Marine Infantry Regiment.

By 1891, he was at the headquarters of the colonial forces at Senegal and in 1892, he was promoted to Chef de Bataillon. In 1900, he was promoted lieutenant-colonel to the 1st Algerian Tirailleurs Regiment. In 1904, he was promoted to colonel in the 1st Foreign Regiment in Casablanca. By 20 March 1914 he was promoted to general inspector of the 1st Military Region.

== World War I ==
After the outbreak of World War I, on 2 August 1914, Boutegourd was given command of the 51st Infantry Division. On 7 September 1914, seven soldiers of the 327th Infantry Regiment were condemned for having abandoned their post. By the order of Brigadier General René Boutegourd, without carrying out a real investigation, the following were ordered to be executed: Barbieux, Clément (deceased on September 9 "from his wounds"), Caffiaux, Désiré Hubert (rehabilitated twelve years later and listed on the war memorial of the town of Trith-Saint-Léger, Nord), Delsarte, Dufour and Waterlot. The latter emerged unscathed from the shooting and died on the forehead on 10 June 1915. The so-called "327th arrondissement" case was the subject of a major rehabilitation campaign by the League for Human Rights, but it was unsuccessful.

In 1919, he was assigned to the 9th Military Region at Tours. He died on 3 April 1932 in Brest.

== Awards ==
- Legion of Honor
  - Knight (20 December 1886)
  - Officer (19 April 1906)
  - Commander (11 July 1914)
  - Grand Officer (6 July 1919)
- Royal Order of Cambodia, Officer (25 July 1887)
- Order of the Black Star, Commander
