= List of public art in Haute-Corse =

This article lists the public art of the Haute-Corse, in Corsica.

== List ==
Title / individual commemorated	Sculptor / Designer	Location	address	Date	Source	Coordinates	Image
Sambucucciu d'Alandu	Noël Bonardi	Alando		1994		42.3069°N 9.2911°E	
Christ Roi	Noël Bonardi	Albertacce	Col de Vergio			42.2906°N 8.8784°E	
Le Minéral	Georges Nadal	Bastia	Lycée Giocante-de-Casabianca	1981		42.7038°N 9.4446°E	
Napoléon Ier en empereur romain	Lorenzo Bartolini	Bastia	Place Saint-Nicolas	1900		42.6998°N 9.451°E	
Bust of Tommaso Prelà		Bastia		2017			
Bust of César Vezzani		Bastia	Théâtre municipal			42.6976°N 9.4482°E	
Equestrian statue of Vincentello d'Istria	Cesare Rabitti	Biguglia	Rond-point de Ceppe	2009		42.6288°N 9.4375°E	
Bust of Charles Marchal		Calvi	Place Charles-Marchal			42.5672°N 8.7574°E	
Fontaine Gavini		Campile				42.4925°N 9.3537°E	
Duc de Padoue	Auguste Bartholdi	Corte	Place du Duc de Padoue	1866		42.3083°N 9.1506°E	
Jean-Pierre Gaffory	Émile Aldebert	Corte	place Gaffory			42.3051°N 9.1497°E	
Pasquale Paoli	Victor Huguenin	Corte	Place Paoli	1852		42.3053°N 9.1511°E	
Bust of Pasquale Paoli		L'Île-Rousse	Place Pasquale Paoli			42.6344°N 8.9381°E	
Stained Glass (Untitled)	Éric Dalbis	Lucciana	Cathedral of Saint Mary of the Assumption of Lucciana				
Pasquale Paoli		Morosaglia				42.434°N 9.2967°E	
Sans titre	Jose Pini	Santa-Maria-Poggio	Port de plaisance de Campoloro	1986		42.3454°N 9.4963°E	

== See also ==
- List of public art in Corse-du-Sud
