= Citadel =

Central military fortification of a town

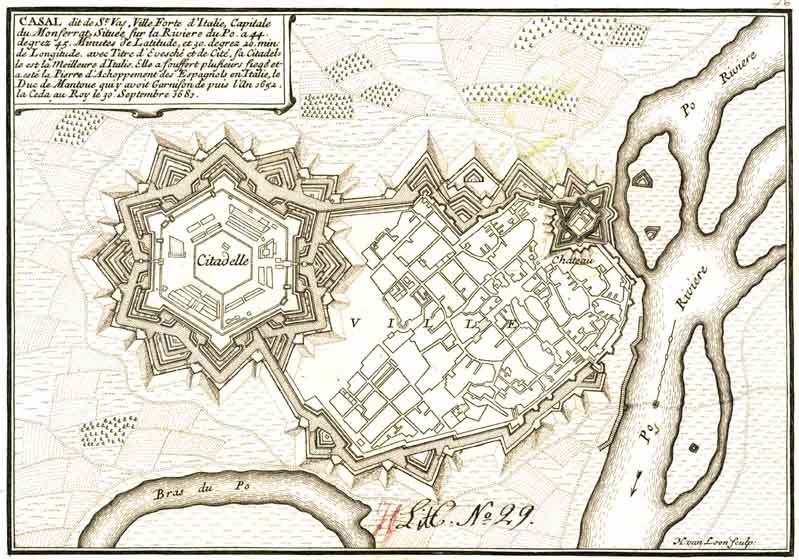
In this seventeenth-century plan of the fortified city of Casale Monferrato the citadel is the large star-shaped structure on the left.

A citadel is the most fortified area of a town or city. It may be a castle, fortress, or fortified center. The term is a diminutive of city, meaning "little city", because it is a smaller part of the city of which it is the defensive core.

In a fortification with bastions, the citadel is the strongest part of the system, sometimes well inside the outer walls and bastions, but often forming part of the outer wall for the sake of economy. It is positioned to be the last line of defence, should the enemy breach the other components of the fortification system.

== History ==
=== 3300–1300 BC ===
Some of the oldest known structures which have served as citadels were built by the Indus Valley civilisation, where citadels represented a centralised authority. Citadels in Indus Valley were almost 12 meters tall. The purpose of these structures, however, remains debated. Though the structures found in the ruins of Mohenjo-daro were walled, it is far from clear that these structures were defensive against enemy attacks. Rather, they may have been built to divert flood waters.

Several settlements in Anatolia, including the Assyrian cities of Kaneš in modern-day Kültepe, featured citadels. Kaneš' citadel contained the city's palace, temples, and official buildings. The citadel of the Greek city of Mycenae was built atop a highly-defensible rectangular hill and was later surrounded by walls in order to increase its defensive capabilities.

=== 800 BC – 400 AD ===
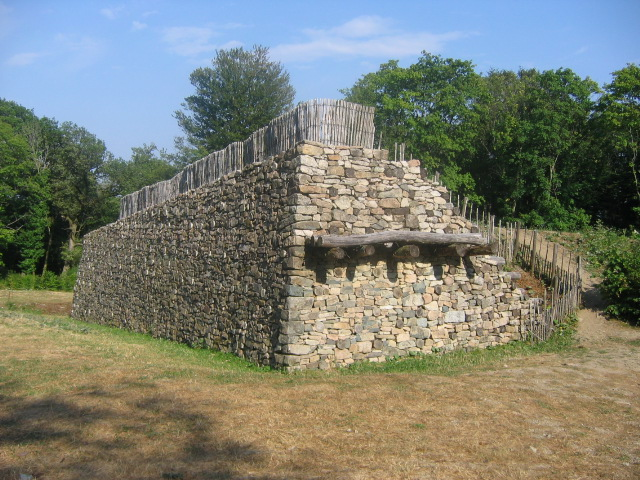
Reconstruction of the redoubt of Bibracte, a part of the Gaulish oppidum. The Celts utilized these fortified cities in the 2nd and 1st centuries BC.

In Ancient Greece, an acropolis, which literally means "high city", placed on a commanding eminence, was important in the life of the people, serving as a lookout, a refuge, and a stronghold in peril, as well as containing military and food supplies, a shrine or temple, and a royal palace. The most well known is the Acropolis of Athens, but nearly every Greek city-state had one – the Acrocorinth is famed as a particularly strong fortress. In a much later period, when Greece was ruled by the Latin Empire, the same strong points were used by the new feudal rulers for much the same purpose.

In the first millennium BC, the Castro culture emerged in northwestern Portugal and Spain in the region extending from the Douro river up to the Minho, but soon expanding north along the coast, and east following the river valleys. It was an autochthonous evolution of Atlantic Bronze Age communities. In 2008, the origins of the Celts were attributed to this period by John T. Koch and supported by Barry Cunliffe. The Ave River Valley in Portugal was the core region of this culture, with a large number of small settlements (the castros), but also settlements known as citadels or oppida by the Roman conquerors. These had several rings of walls and the Roman conquest of the citadels of Abobriga, Lambriaca and Cinania around 138 BC was possible only by prolonged siege. Ruins of notable citadels still exist, and are known by archaeologists as Citânia de Briteiros, Citânia de Sanfins, Cividade de Terroso and Cividade de Bagunte.

==== 167–160 BC ====
Rebels who took power in a city, but with the citadel still held by the former rulers, could by no means regard their tenure of power as secure. One such incident played an important part in the history of the Maccabean Revolt against the Seleucid Empire. The Hellenistic garrison of Jerusalem and local supporters of the Seleucids held out for many years in the Acra citadel, making Maccabean rule in the rest of Jerusalem precarious. When finally gaining possession of the place, the Maccabeans pointedly destroyed and razed the Acra, though they constructed another citadel for their own use in a different part of Jerusalem.

=== 400–1600 ===
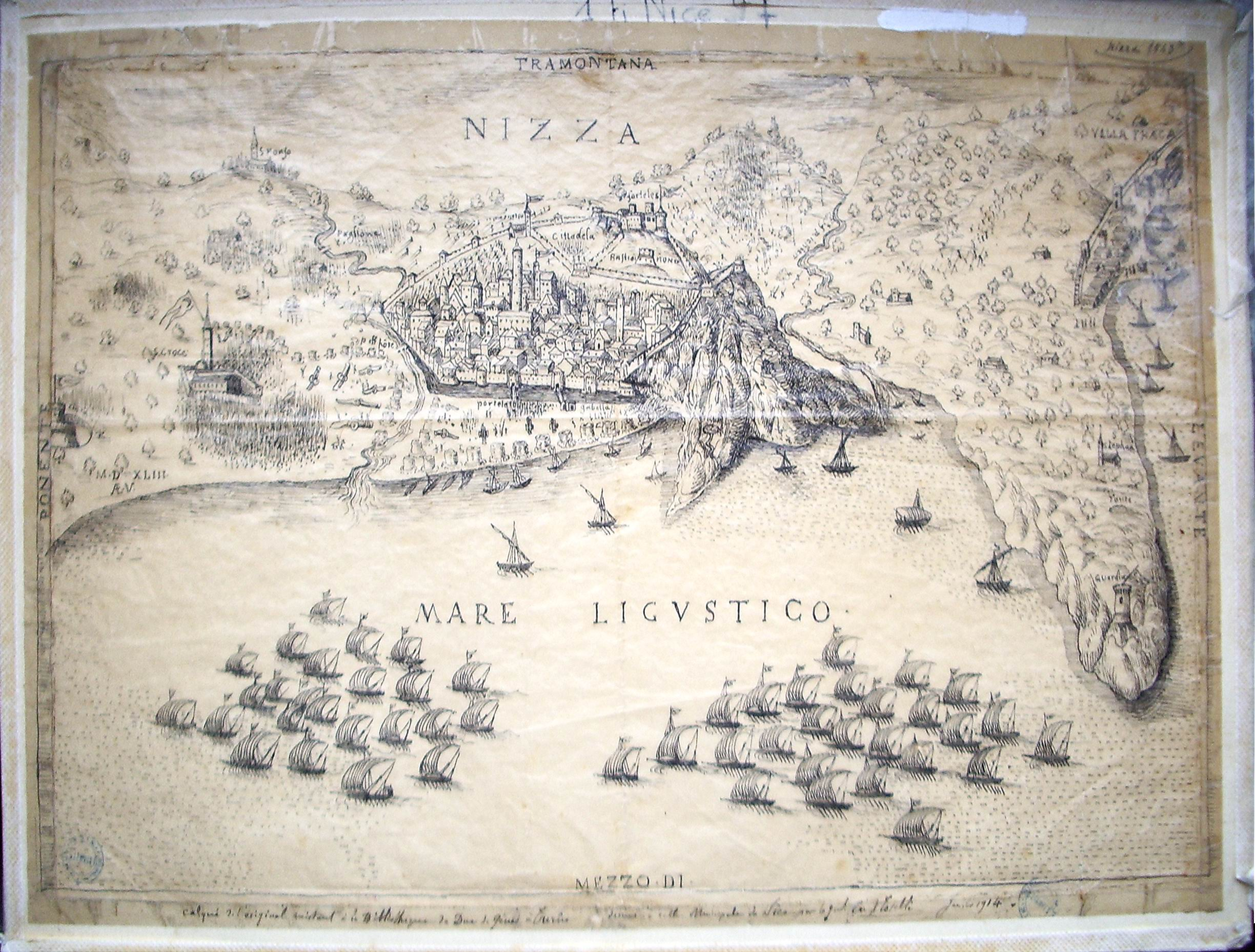
Although much of Nice was ransacked during the 1543 siege of the city, Franco-Ottoman forces besieging Nice were unable to capture its Citadel. Citadels have often been used as a last defence for a besieged army.

At various periods, and particularly during the Middle Ages and the Renaissance, the citadel – having its own fortifications, independent of the city walls – was the last defence of a besieged army, often held after the town had been conquered. Locals and defending armies have often held out citadels long after the city had fallen. For example, in the 1543 Siege of Nice the Ottoman forces led by Barbarossa conquered and pillaged the town and took many captives, but the citadel held out.

In the Philippines, the Ivatan people of the northern islands of Batanes often built fortifications to protect themselves during times of war. They built their so-called idjangs on hills and elevated areas. These fortifications were likened to European castles because of their purpose. Usually, the only entrance to the castles would be via a rope ladder that would only be lowered for the villagers and could be kept away when invaders arrived.

=== 1600 to the present ===
In times of war, the citadel in many cases afforded retreat to the people living in the areas around the town. However, citadels were often used also to protect a garrison or political power from the inhabitants of the town where it was located, being designed to ensure loyalty from the town that they defended. This was used, for example, during the Dutch Wars of 1664–1667: King Charles II of England constructed a Royal Citadel at Plymouth, an important channel port which needed to be defended from a possible naval attack. However, due to Plymouth's support for the Parliamentarians, in the then-recent English Civil War, the Plymouth Citadel was so designed that its guns could fire on the town as well as on the sea approaches.

Barcelona had a great citadel built in 1714 to intimidate the Catalans against repeating their mid-17th- and early-18th-century rebellions against the Spanish central government. In the 19th century, when the political climate had liberalized enough to permit it, the people of Barcelona had the citadel torn down, and replaced it with the city's main central park, the Parc de la Ciutadella. A similar example is the Citadella in Budapest, Hungary.

The attack on the Bastille in the French Revolution – though afterwards remembered mainly for the release of the handful of prisoners incarcerated there – was to considerable degree motivated by the structure's being a Royal citadel in the midst of revolutionary Paris.

Similarly, after Garibaldi's overthrow of Bourbon rule in Palermo, during the 1860 Unification of Italy, Palermo's Castellamare Citadel – a symbol of the hated and oppressive former rule – was ceremoniously demolished.

Following Belgium gaining its independence in 1830, a Dutch garrison under General David Hendrik Chassé held out in Antwerp Citadel between 1830 and 1832, while the city had already become part of independent Belgium.

The Siege of the Alcázar in the Spanish Civil War, in which the Nationalists held out against a much larger Republican force for two months until relieved, shows that in some cases a citadel can be effective even in modern warfare; a similar case is the Battle of Huế during the Vietnam War, where a North Vietnamese Army division held the citadel of Huế for 26 days against roughly their own numbers of much better-equipped US and South Vietnamese troops.

=== Modern usage ===
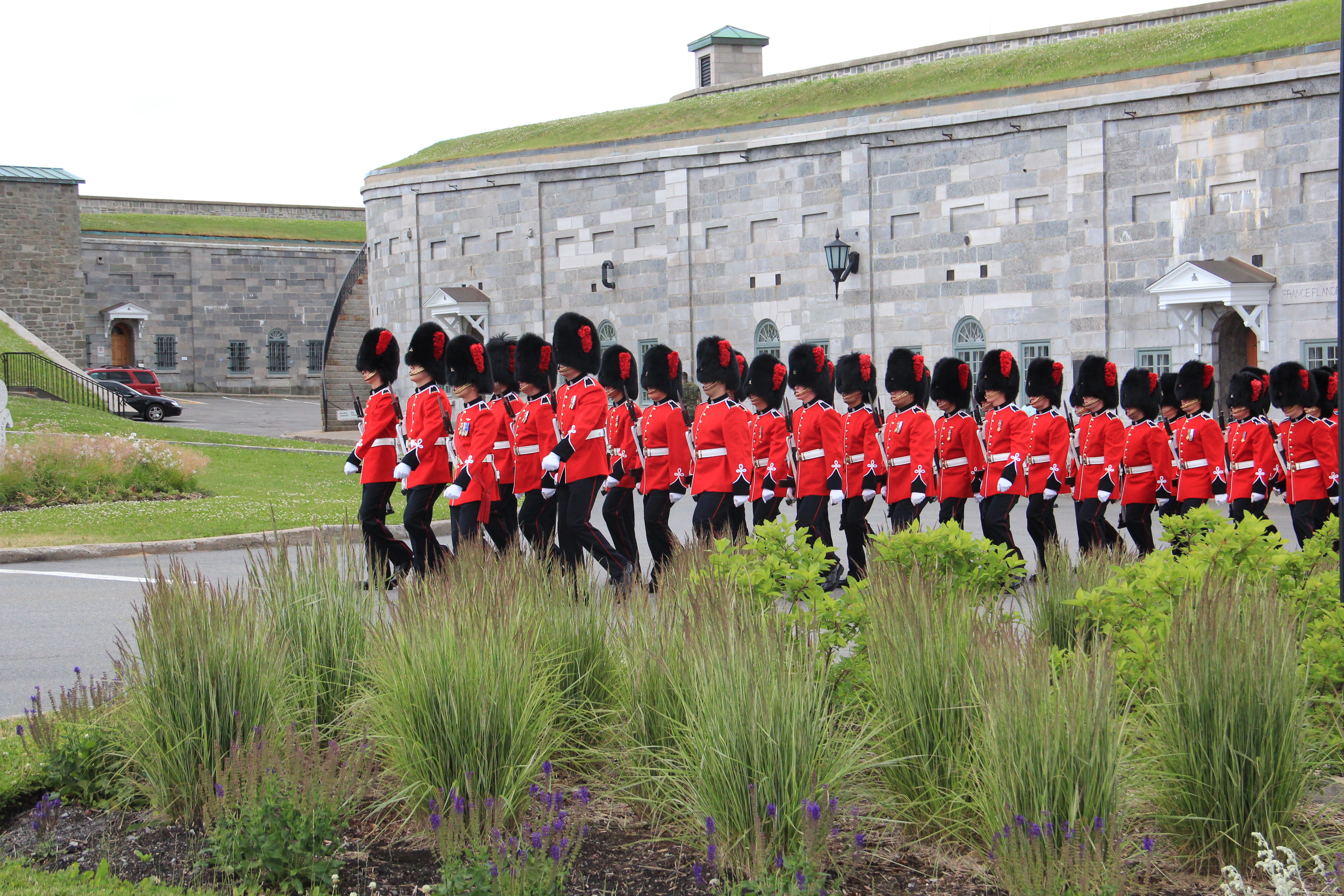
The Royal 22nd Regiment's home garrison is the Citadelle of Quebec in Canada. The citadel is the largest still in military operation in North America.

The Citadelle of Québec (the construction was started in 1673 and completed in 1820) still survives as the largest citadel still in official military operation in North America. It is home to the Royal 22nd Regiment of the Canadian Army and forms part of the Ramparts of Quebec City dating back to 1620s.

Since the mid 20th century, citadels have commonly enclosed military command and control centres, rather than cities or strategic points of defence on the boundaries of a country. These modern citadels are built to protect the command centre from heavy attacks, such as aerial or nuclear bombardment. The military citadels under London in the UK, including the massive underground complex Pindar beneath the Ministry of Defence, are examples, as is the Cheyenne Mountain nuclear bunker in the US.

== Naval term ==
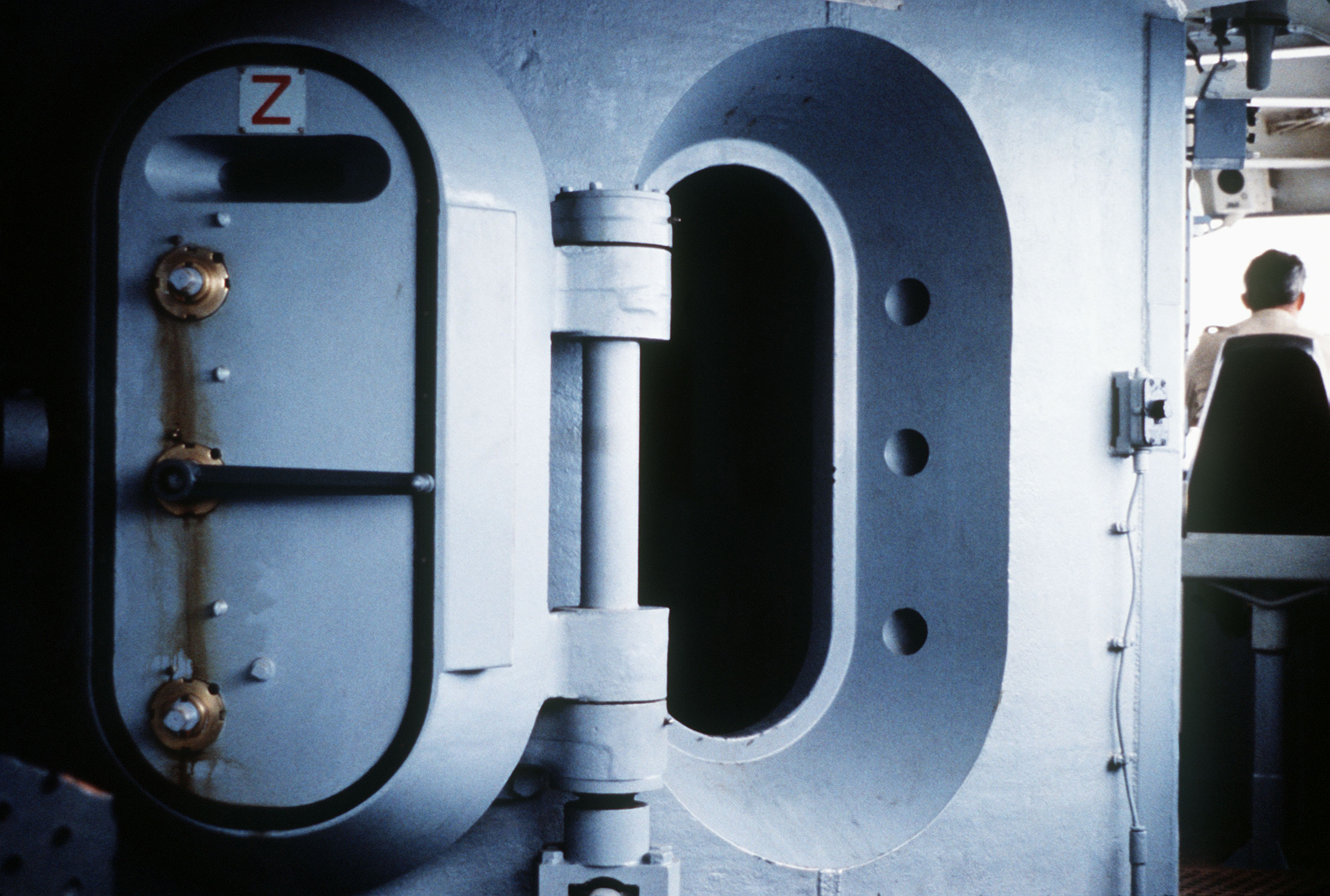
Entrance to the armoured citadel of USS New Jersey

On armoured warships, the heavily armoured section of the ship that protects the ammunition and machinery spaces is called the armoured citadel.

A modern naval interpretation refers to the heaviest protected part of the hull as "the vitals", and the citadel is the semi-armoured freeboard above the vitals. Generally, Anglo-American and German languages follow this while Russian sources/language refer to "the vitals" as цитадель "citadel". Likewise, Russian literature often refers to the turret of a tank as the 'tower'.

The safe room on a ship is also called a citadel.

== See also ==
- List of citadels
- Acropolis
- Alcázar
- Arx (Roman)
- Fujian Tulou
- Kasbah
- Kremlin (fortification)
- Presidio
- Rocca (fortification)
- List of cities with defensive walls
- List of forts
