= Citadel of Namur =

Fortress in Namur, Belgium

- Citadelle de Namur (French)
- Namur, Wallonia, Belgium
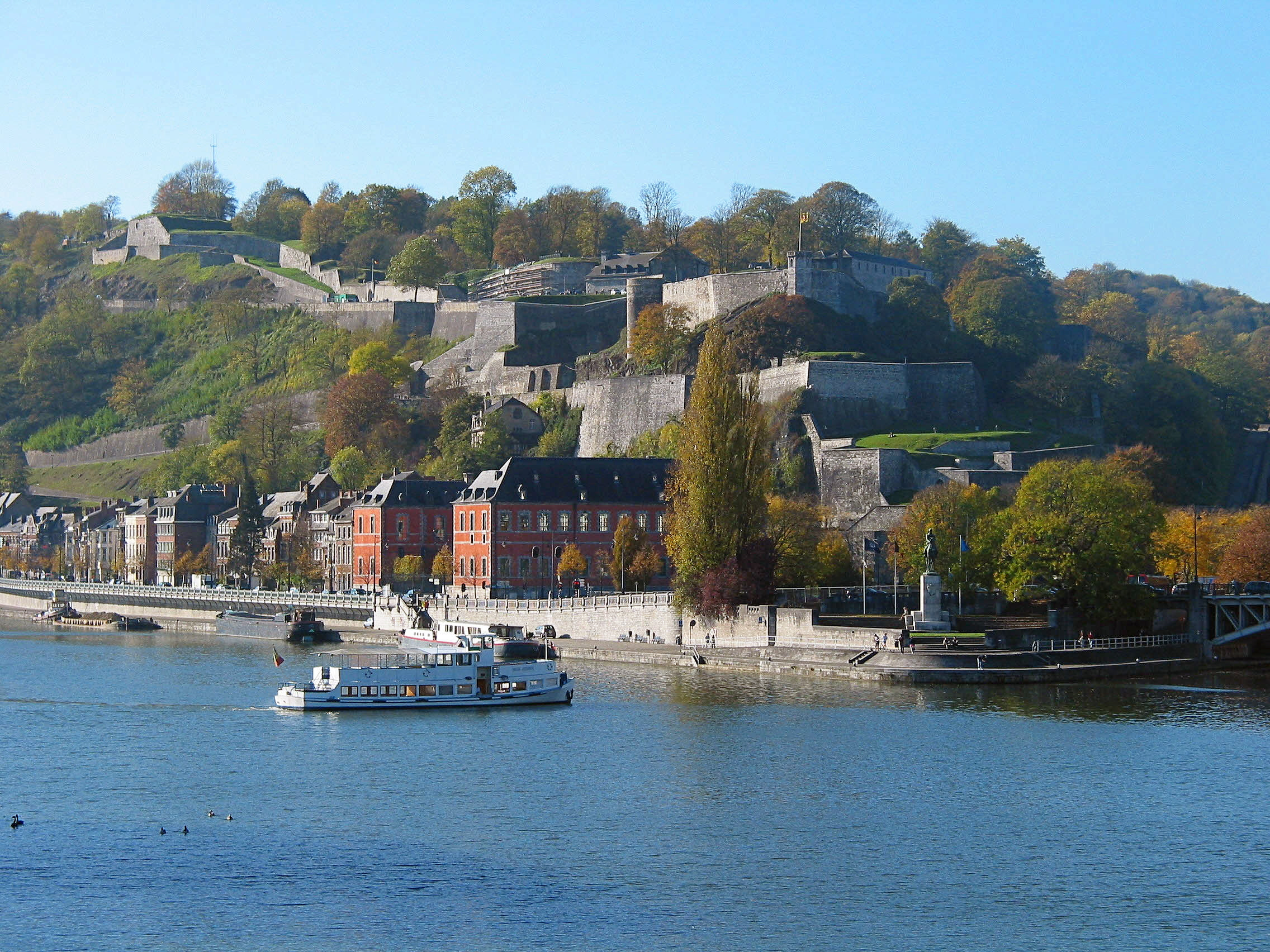
- The Citadel of Namur, with the Meuse and the Parliament of Wallonia in the foreground

Site information
- Type: Fort
- Controlled by: Belgium
- Open to the public: Yes

Location
- Coordinates: 50.4605°N 4.8640°E

Site history
- Built: 937
- Materials: Stone

The Citadel of Namur (French: Citadelle de Namur) is a fortress in the Walloon capital city of Namur, at the confluence of the Sambre and Meuse rivers. It is originally from the Roman era, but has been rebuilt several times. Its current form was designed by Menno van Coehoorn, and improved upon by Vauban after the siege of 1692. It has been classified as a Wallonia Major Heritage site. Its highest point sits at 190 metres (620 ft). Together with those at Dinant, Huy and Liège, the Citadel of Namur forms part of the so-called Meuse Citadels.

The original citadel dates to 937. It achieved its present extent between 1631 and 1675, when the city was under Dutch control. This section was called "Terra Nova" to distinguish it from the smaller Médiane fort built adjacent in 1542 and ensuing years. A variety of subsidiary positions were built in the 18th century. It was disestablished as a military post in 1891, superseded by a new ring of forts around Namur that were calculated to prevent the city from being attacked with artillery. This ring became the Fortified Position of Namur in the 1930s. The citadel was used as protected space for its command post.

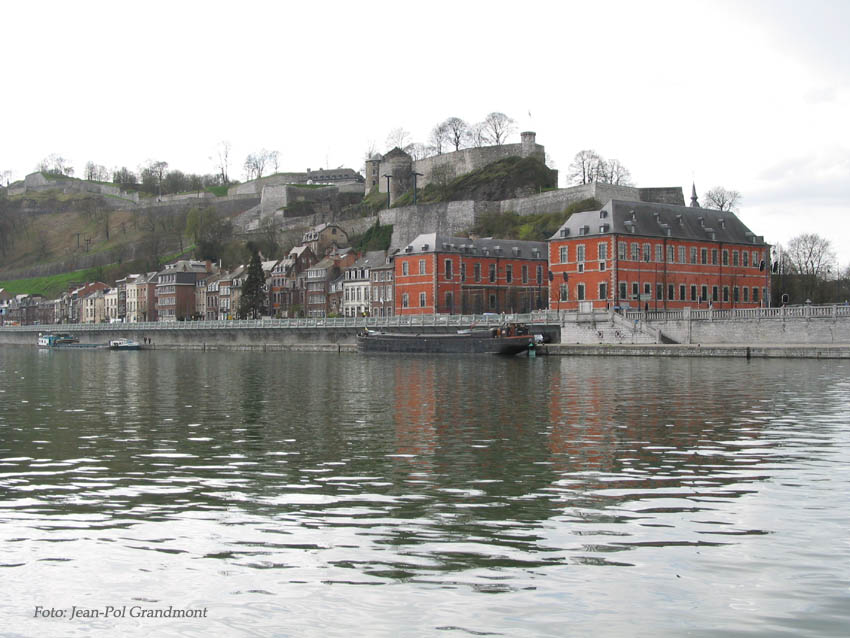
Namur, the Meuse, the Parliament of Wallonia and the citadel

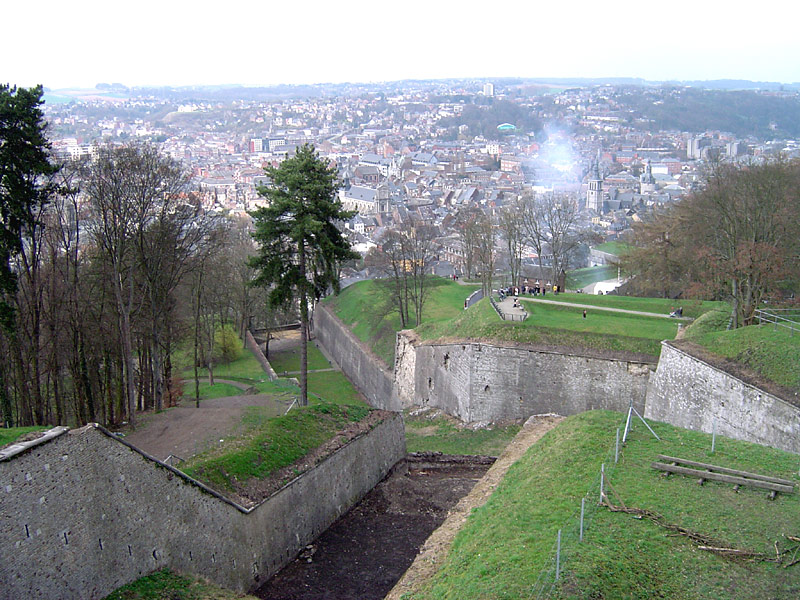
Citadel of Namur

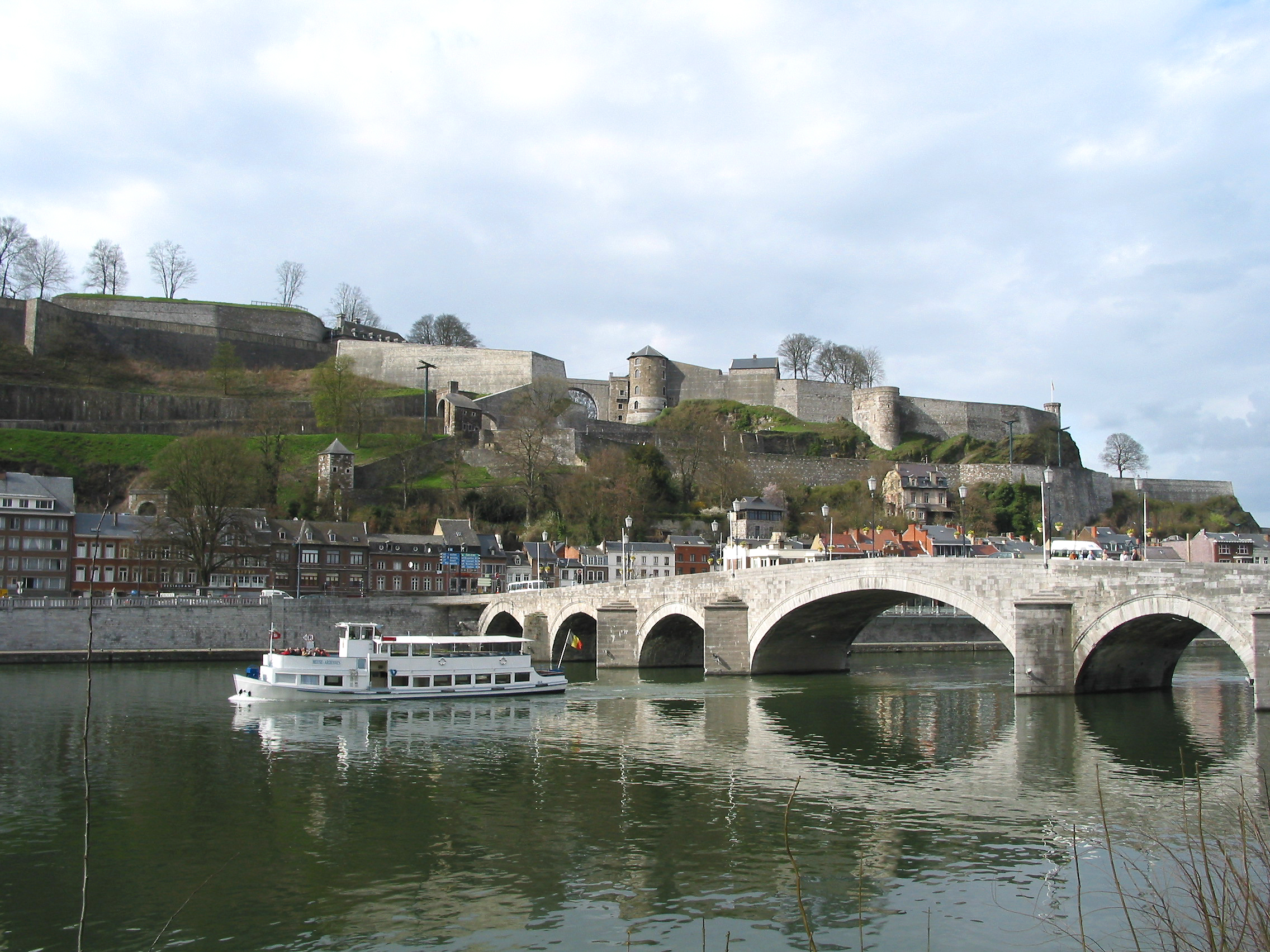
The Jambes Bridge over the Meuse, in front of the citadel

== See also ==
- History of Namur city
- List of castles in Belgium
