= Citadel of Liège =

Partially destroyed fortress in Liège, Belgium

- Citadelle de Liège (French)
- Part of Fortified Position of Liège
- Liège, Wallonia, Belgium
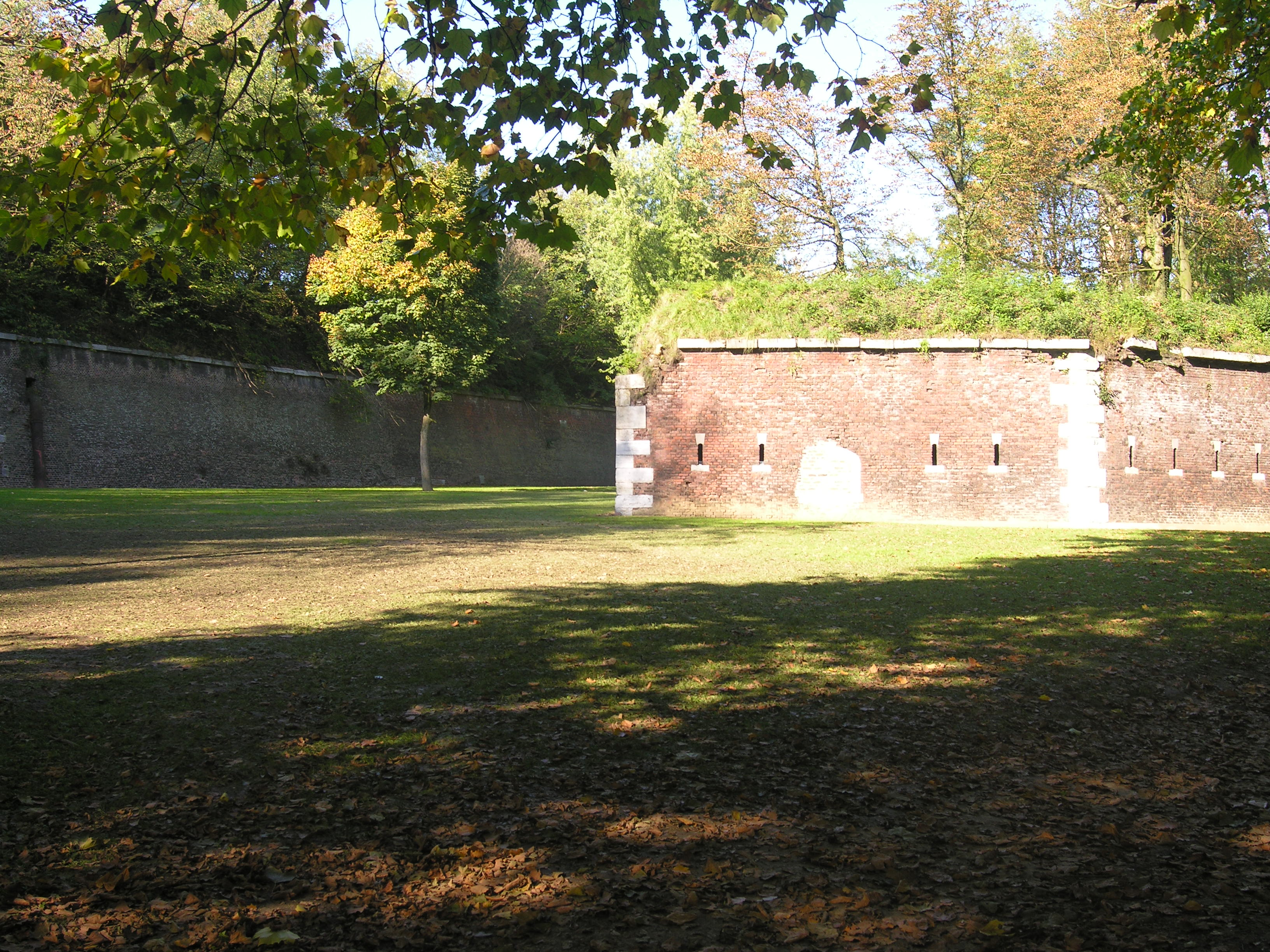
- Surviving walls of the citadel

Site information
- Type: Fort
- Owner: Hôpital CHR Citadelle
- Controlled by: Belgium
- Open to the public: Yes
- Condition: Parkland, hospital site

Location
- Coordinates: 50.652°N 5.578°E

Site history
- Built: 1255
- Materials: Masonry
- Battles/wars: Battle of Liège, Battle of Belgium

The Citadel of Liège (French: Citadelle de Liège) was the central fortification of the strategic Belgian city of Liège, Wallonia, until the end of the 19th century. It is located in the Sainte-Walburge neighborhood, 111 metres (364 ft) above the Meuse valley. Together with those at Dinant, Huy and Namur, the Citadel of Liège forms part of the so-called Meuse Citadels.

The first citadel was built on the heights overlooking the city in 1255. It was rebuilt in a pentagonal shape by Prince-Bishop Maximilian Henry of Bavaria in 1650. This fortress was destroyed by France shortly afterwards, then rebuilt in 1684. During the Napoleonic Wars, it was given five bastions in the style of Vauban. By the late 19th century, the citadel had become obsolete as a fort, replaced by the twelve forts of the Fortified Position of Liège, though it continued in use as a barracks and as a command post for the Fortified Position, contributing to the country's National Redoubt.

In the 1970s, the citadel was largely destroyed by the construction of a hospital on the site. The southern walls remain. An area on the north side is a memorial to Belgians executed in the citadel by German occupiers in World Wars I and II, while 20th-century bunkers remain on the south side.

== History ==
=== Early history ===
Around the year 1000, during the reign of Notker, Prince-Bishop of Liège, the city built its first walls in sandstone. The enclosure was shaped like an elongated rectangle of about 25 hectares (62 acres), surrounded with a ditch and lined with towers and gates. A gate tower was built at the foot of Pierruse. The first bridge at the site of the Pont des Arches was built around 1033. In the early 12th century Holy Roman Emperor Henri IV proposed a larger enclosure, but failed to raise the necessary funds. A new wall was started in 1204 from the Porte Sainte-Walburge to Paienporte, then down to the river, and another wall was under construction between the Hocheporte and Sainte-Walburge. In May 1212 the still uncompleted walls were scaled by the troops of Henry I, Duke of Brabant, who sacked the city. Encouraged by this setback, the townsmen completed the walls in 1215.

In 1255 Prince-Bishop Henri de Gueldre built the Porte Sainte Walburga, furnished with towers, a well, a drawbridge and a prison, which was in effect the first citadel on the site. In 1468 the troops of Charles the Bold destroyed the city despite an attack by the 600 Franchimontois.

=== 17th century ===
In 1650 the Holy Roman Emperor granted Prince-Bishop Maximilien Henri de Bavière permission to build a fort. He erected a large well-protected rectangle, relying on German engineers. The walls were of earthen construction, incorporating the 1548 Sainte-Walburge bastion. However, the construction was blown up by the French shortly after completion.

Work began in 1663 on the first permanent masonry citadel. In 1671 work was completed on a pentagonal fortress with bastions at the angles and demi-lunes. On the outer side the walls were lined with ditches, and the citadel was integrated with the city walls. The bastions were named for St. Lambert, St. Francis, St. Mary, St. Maximilian and St. Henry. The Chapel of St. Balbina was placed in the center of the citadel. The French took the citadel in 1675. In 1676 the French demolished the citadel to prevent it from falling into the hands of its enemies. The bastions, demi-lunes and part of the old ramparts were undermined. In 1684 Prince-Bishop Maximilian Henry of Bavaria began to rebuild the citadel. However, the 1685 Treaty of Versailles, which guaranteed the neutrality of the Liégeoise, required the citadel's demolition. In 1691 French troops commanded by Louis François, duc de Boufflers bombarded the city from the vicinity of the Fort de la Chartreuse during the Nine Years' War.

In 1692 the Dutch general Menno van Coehoorn organized the defense of Liège. He established a series of protected trenches on the left bank of the Meuse. This system employed light troops supported by artillery, reflecting van Coehoorn's lack of interest in fortifications.

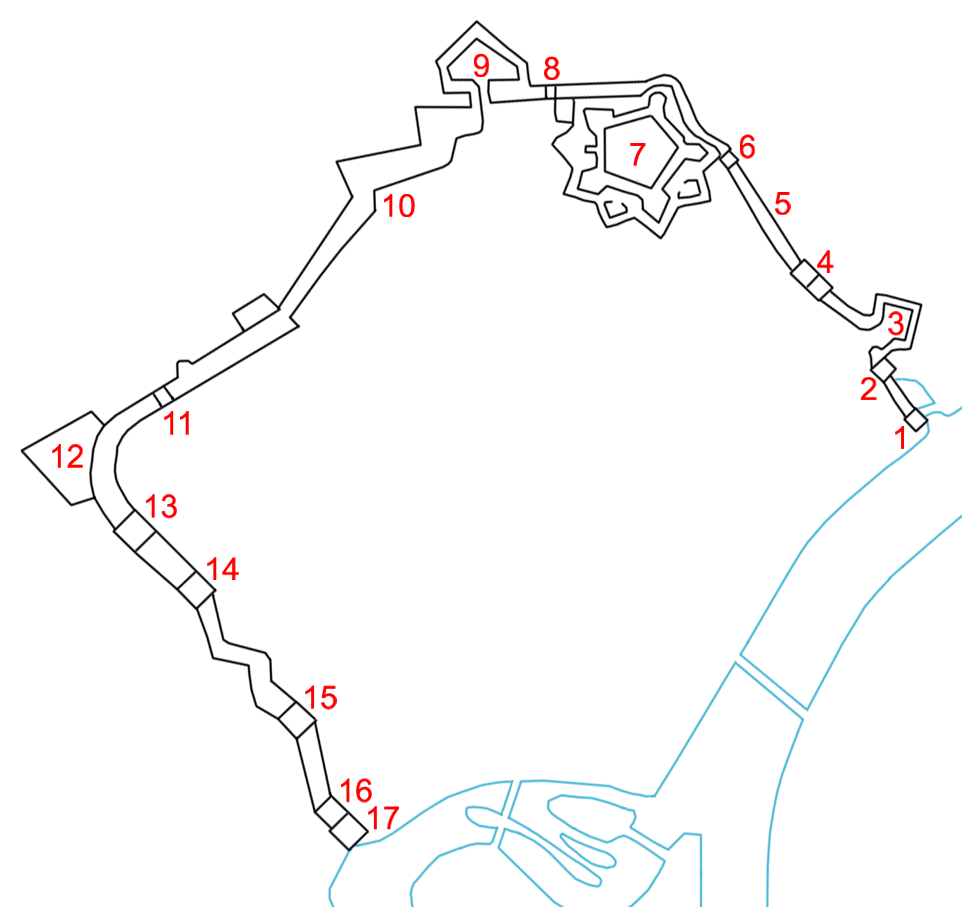
Fortifications of Liège at the end of the 17th century.: 1. Porte Maghin, 2. Porte Saint-Léonard, 3. Bastion Saint-Léonard, 4. Porte de Vivegnis, 5. Rempart des Six-Cents-Degrés, 6. Païenporte, 7. Citadel, 8. Porte Sainte-Walburge, 9. Bastion du Clergé, 10. Bastion des Anglais, 11. Hocheporte, 12. Bastion du Saint-Esprit, 13. Porte Sainte-Marguerite, 14. Porte Saint-Martin, 15. Tour des Moxhons, 16. Porte des Bégards, 17. Tour des Bégards.

=== 18th century ===
With the commencement of the War of Spanish Succession in 1701, the engineer Jacques de la Combe was delegated by Vauban to repair the citadel. In 1702 the engineer Filley reported to Vauban, describing the state of the citadel as lamentable. Vauban came to Liège to try to convince Prince-Bishop Joseph Clemens of Bavaria to underwrite the cost of repairs.

In 1702 the allies under van Coehoorn laid siege to the citadel for three days. In 1703 in accordance with the Treaties of Namur and Utrecht, Liège was declared neutral. New work continued from 1707 to 1711 with the addition of new bastions and demi-lunes.

The 1713 Treaty of Utrecht established peace between France and the Republic of the Seven United Provinces, followed by the Treaty of Rastatt which settled disputes between France and the Holy Roman Empire, thereby ending the War of Spanish Succession. In 1715 the Treaty of the Barrier was signed at Antwerp between the Empire and the United Provinces, requiring the demolition of the citadel of Liège The bastions and walls on the town side of the citadel remained.

=== 19th century ===
In 1815 the Dutch took control of the area following the defeat of Napoleon. In 1816 William I of the Netherlands authorized the reconstruction of the citadel to a plan by Camerlingh. In 1817 the St. Balbina chapel, the old Porte Sainte-Walburge and the bastion du Clergé were demolished. The Sainte-Lambert and Sainte-François bastions were rebuilt and demi-lune outworks were added.

The Dutch garrison capitulated during the Belgian Revolution of 1830. The second battalion of the first Belgian Independent Regiment occupied the citadel. In 1891 a royal decree downgraded the citadel and the nearby Fort de la Chartreuse, following the construction of twelve modern forts surrounding Liége. The citadel was used as a barracks and command post.

=== 20th century ===
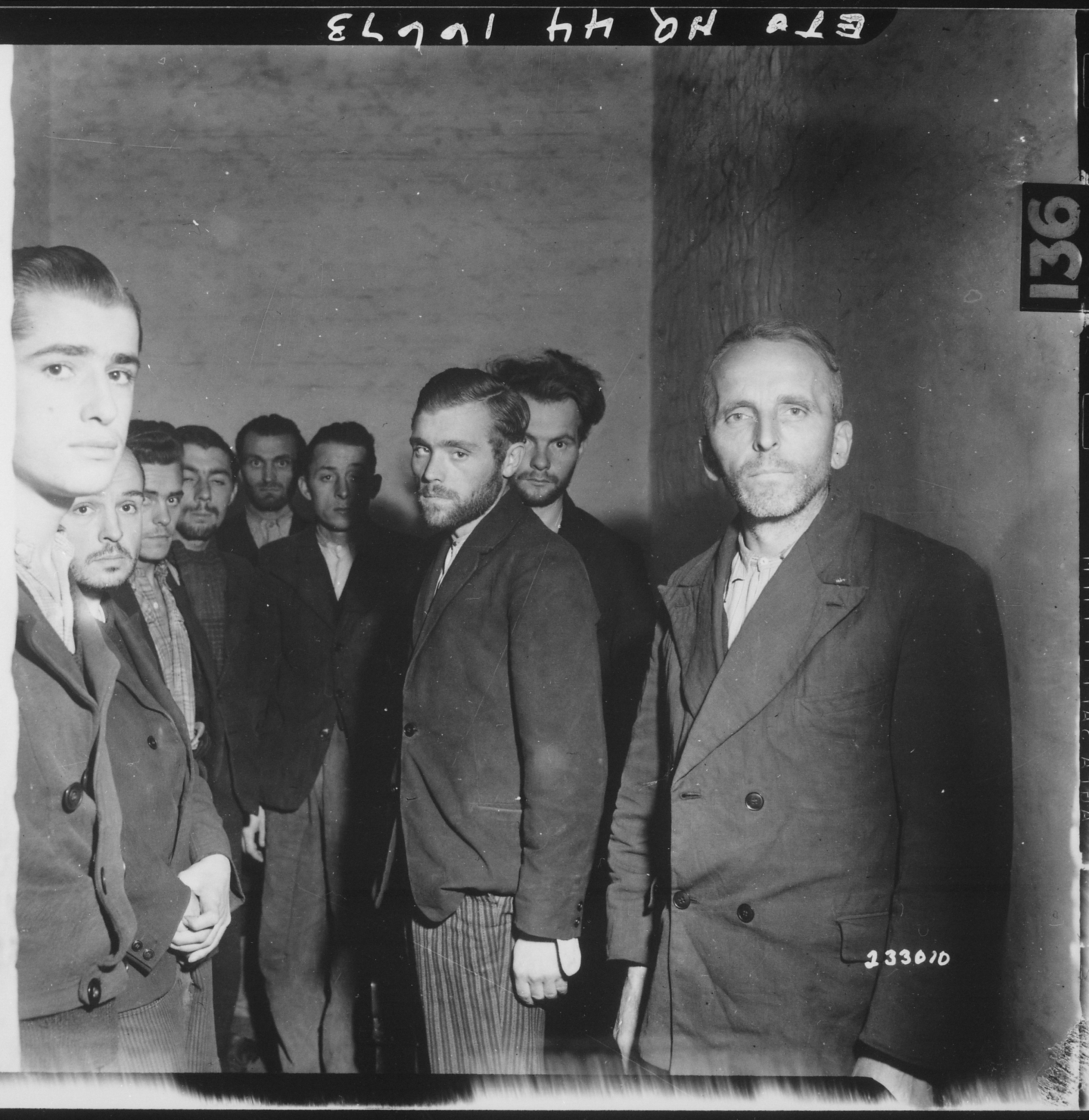
German Gestapo agents arrested after the fall of Liège, Belgium, are herded together in a cell in the citadel of Liège.

In 1911 Belgian troops were billeted in the citadel. In August 1914 they participated in the defense of Liège from German invasion. Following the surrender of the city the citadel was used as a place of internment and as a hospital. It continued in use as a hospital following the 1918 armistice.

A command post for the Fortified Position of Liège was established in the southern portion of the citadel, in a section which survives. The rounded concrete forms of the three bunkers contrast with the older masonry. The command post was augmented after World War II with an air intake tower equipped with filters for nuclear, biological and chemical contaminants.

Following the Battle of Belgium in May 1940 the citadel was once again used by German forces to intern Belgians. It was occupied by American forces in 1945, and in 1947 Belgian forces reoccupied the citadel.

In 1946 a memorial was established to those who had been executed in the citadel during World Wars I and II. The Enclos des Fusillés ("enclosure of those shot by firing squad") was dedicated in 1947, with 197 crosses commemorating the dead.

In 1967 the citadel was turned over to the Public Centre for Social Welfare of Liège, and in 1970 construction of the Centre hospitalier régional de la Citadelle was begun, destroying much of the old citadel. Work on the hospital building started in 1974 and was completed in 1978. Due to the presence of underground excavations, the hospital was placed on driven piles for support.

On 21 December 1977 the fortress and the Païenporte Well were listed as classified structures. On 11 October 1982 the bastions and curtain walls were designated, and on 23 March 1988 the walls and the Porte de Païenporte were classified.

== Gallery ==
Graphic portrayal of the citadel's evolution:

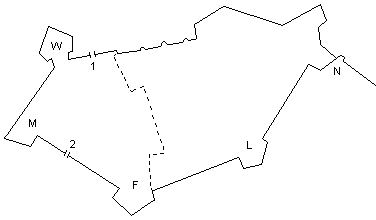
Citadel of Liège in 1650

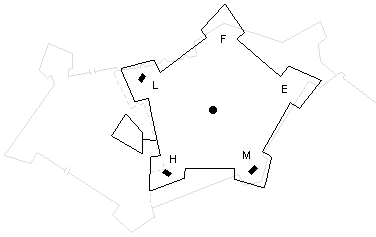
Citadel of Liège in 1671

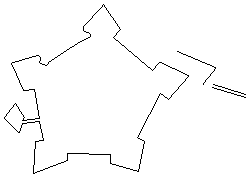
Citadel of Liège in 1694

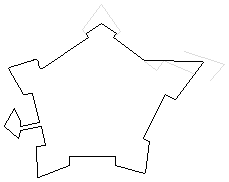
Citadel of Liège in 1698

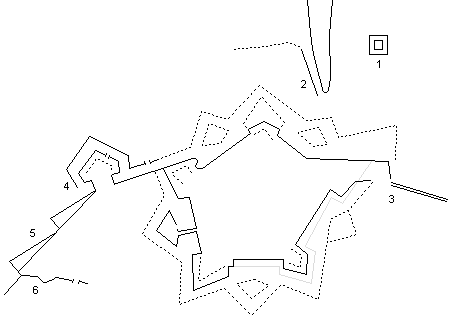
Citadel of Liège in 1702

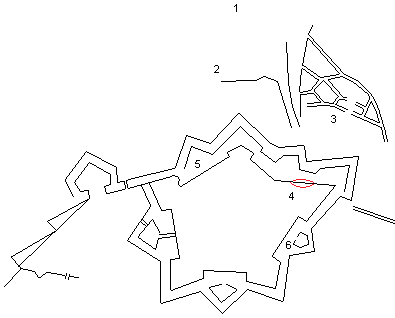
Citadel of Liège on 23 October 1702

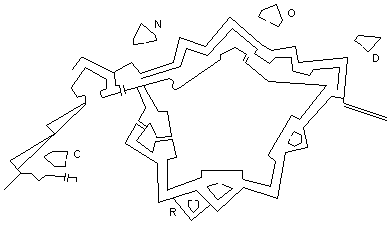
Citadel of Liège in 1711

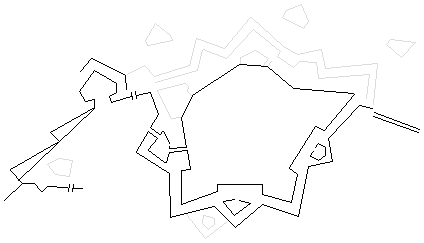
Citadel of Liège in 1715

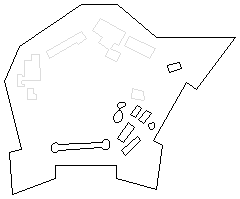
Citadel of Liège in 1816

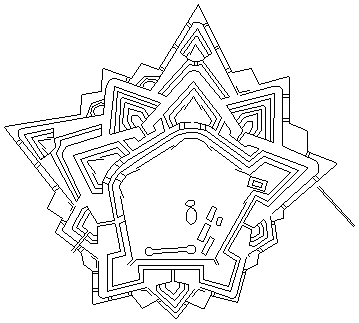
Camerlingh project in 1817

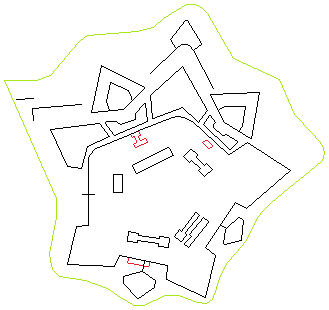
Citadel in the 1940s

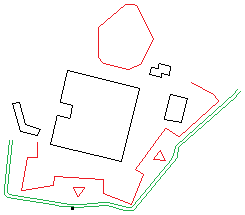
Citadel of Liège in 1978

== Bibliography ==
Jules Loxhay, Histoire de l'enceinte et de la citadelle sur la rive gauche de la Meuse, à Liège, 1999, 207 p., Liège, Centre Liégeois d'Histoire et d'Archéologie Militaire OCLC 51670581
