= Citadel of Huy =

Fortress in Liège, Belgium

- Citadelle de Huy (French)
- Huy, Wallonia, Belgium
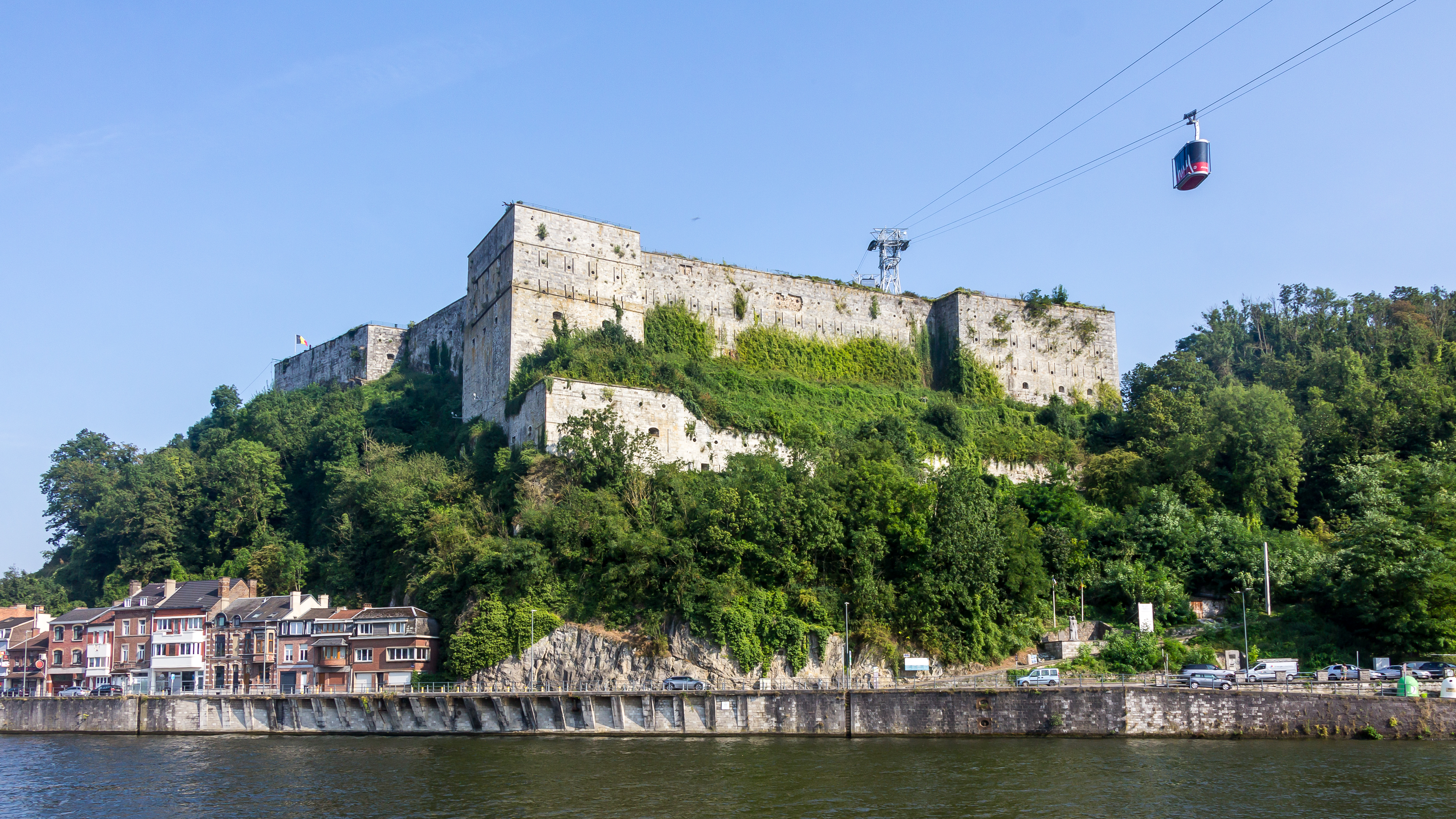
- View of the citadel and banks of the Meuse river

Site information
- Type: Fort
- Controlled by: Belgium
- Open to the public: Yes

Location
- Coordinates: 50.5173°N 5.2371°E

Site history
- Built: 9th century
- Materials: Stone

The Citadel of Huy (French: Citadelle de Huy) or the Fort of Huy (French: Fort de Huy), known locally as The Castle (Walloon: Li Tchestia), is a fortress located in the Walloon city of Huy in the province of Liège, Belgium. The fort occupies a high position in the town, overlooking the strategic Meuse river. Together with those at Dinant, Liège and Namur, the Citadel of Huy forms part of the so-called Meuse Citadels.

The site of the citadel has been fortified since the 9th century, and various structures have been built on the site. The current fort dates to 1818 during the period of Dutch rule in Belgium and took five years to build. The citadel was frequently used to house political prisoners. In the 19th century, members of the revolutionary Belgian Legion were imprisoned after their failed invasion of Belgium at Risquons-Tout in 1848. During the German occupation of Belgium in World War II, six thousand Belgian political prisoners, including the Communist Julien Lahaut, were held at the citadel and many were later sent to concentration camps in Germany.
