= Citadelle d'Ajaccio =

Fortress in Corse-du-Sud, France

Coordinates: 41°55′0″N 8°44′25″E

Citadelle d'Ajaccio

Citadelle d'Ajaccio is a fortress in Corse-du-Sud, France. It was built in 1492.
