= Citadel of Dinant =

Fortress in Dinant, Belgium

- Citadelle de Dinant (French)
- Dinant, Wallonia, Belgium
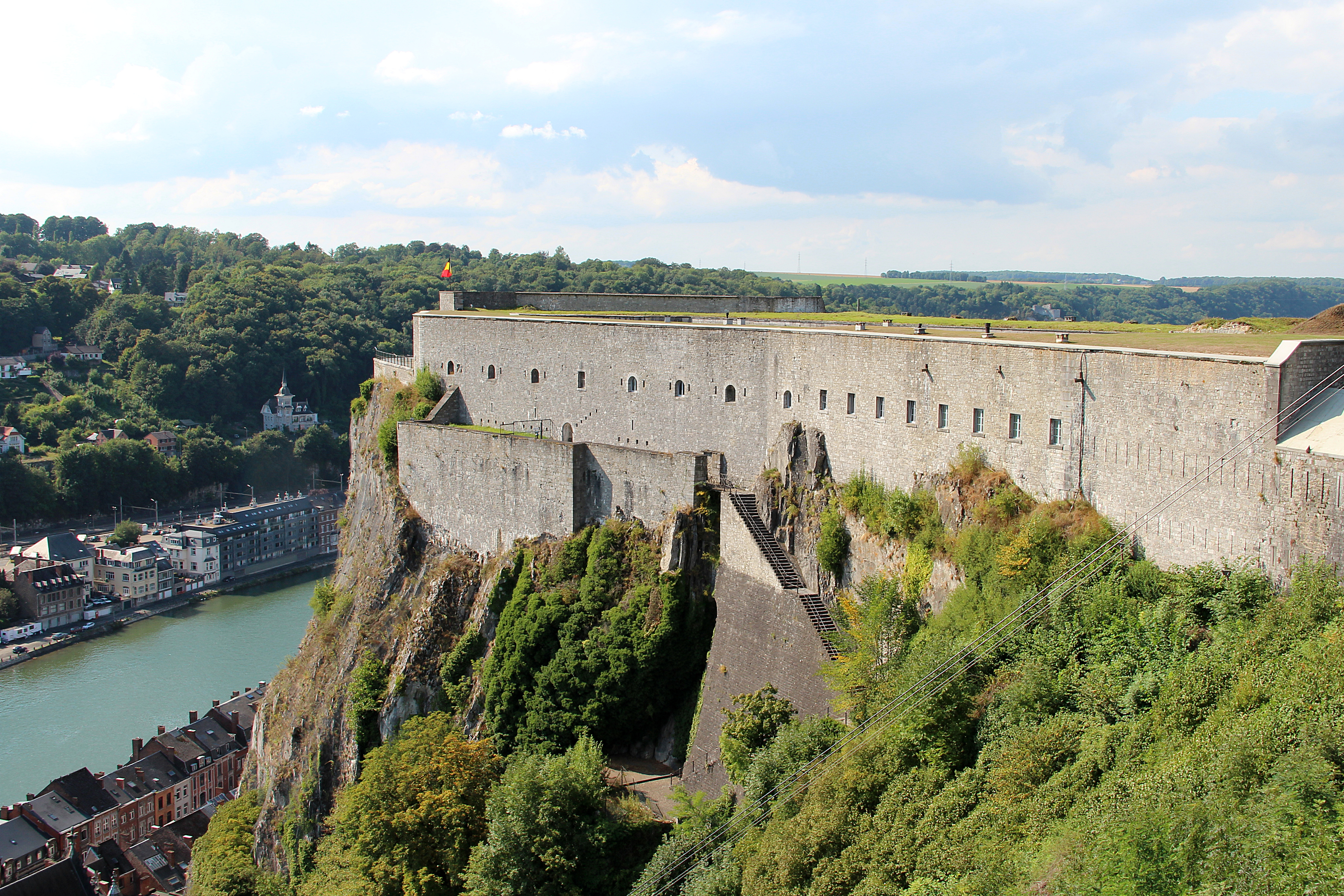
- View of the city and the river from the citadel

Site information
- Type: Fort
- Controlled by: Belgium
- Open to the public: Yes

Location
- Coordinates: 50°15′42″N 4°54′47″E

Site history
- Built: 1051
- Materials: Stone

The Citadel of Dinant (French: Citadelle de Dinant) is a fortress located in the Walloon city of Dinant in the province of Namur, Belgium. The current fort was built in 1815 on a site which was originally fortified in 1051 when the region was ruled by the Prince-Bishopric of Liège. The citadel overlooks the city of Dinant and the strategic Meuse river which runs through the town. It is open to the public. Together with those at Huy, Liège and Namur, the Citadel of Dinant forms part of the so-called Meuse Citadels.
