= List of United States post offices in Utah =

United States post offices operate under the authority of the United States Post Office Department (1792–1971) or the United States Postal Service (since 1971). Historically, post offices were usually placed in a prominent location. Many were architecturally distinctive, including notable buildings featuring Beaux-Arts, Art Deco, and Vernacular architecture. However, modern U.S. post offices were generally designed for functionality rather than architectural style.

Following is a list of United States post offices in Utah. Notable post offices include individual buildings, whether still in service or not, which have architectural, historical, or community-related significance. Many of these are listed on the National Register of Historic Places (NRHP) or state and local historic registers.

Post office	City	Date built	image	Architect	Notes	Ref.
Beaver Main Post Office	Beaver	1941		Louis A. Simon	(Note: Listed on the National Register of Historic Places.)	
U.S. Post Office-Cedar City Main	Cedar City	1932–1933		Cannon & Fetzer		
Echo Post Office	Echo	c. 1928		unknown		
U.S. Post Office-Eureka Main	Eureka	1922		James A. Wetmore		
United States Post Office-Helper Main	Helper	1938		Louis A. Simon		
Nephi Main Post Office	Nephi	1933		James A. Wetmore		
United States Post Office and Courthouse (Ogden, Utah)	Ogden	1905–1909		James Knox Taylor		
United States Post Office-Price Main	Price	1931		Louis A. Simon		
U.S. Post Office-Richfield Main	Richfield	1919		James A. Wetmore		
Deseret Telegraph and Post Office	Rockville	1864		unknown	(Note: No longer used as a post office)	
U.S. Post Office-Sugar House	Salt Lake City	1939–1940		Louis A. Simon		
United States Post Office-Springville Main	Springville	1941		Louis A. Simon		
