= National Register of Historic Places listings in Juab County, Utah =

Location of Juab County in Utah

This is a list of the National Register of Historic Places listings in Juab County, Utah.

This is intended to be a complete list of the properties and districts on the National Register of Historic Places in Juab County, Utah, United States. Latitude and longitude coordinates are provided for many National Register properties and districts; these locations may be seen together in a map.

There are 23 properties and districts listed on the National Register in the county. One other site in the county was once listed, but has since been removed.

This National Park Service list is complete through NPS recent listings posted May 1, 2026.

== Current listings ==
	Name on the Register	Image	Date listed	Location	City or town	Description
1	Edwin Robert Booth House	Edwin Robert Booth House	December 6, 1979 (#79002497)	94 W. 300 South; 39°42′15″N 111°50′13″W	Nephi	
2	Oscar M. Booth House	Oscar M. Booth House	April 18, 1983 (#83004399)	395 E. 100 South; 39°42′32″N 111°50′19″W	Nephi	
3	Centennial-Eureka Mine		March 14, 1979 (#79003481)	South of Eureka; 39°56′40″N 112°07′22″W	Eureka	
4	Diamond Cemetery		March 14, 1979 (#79003474)	Diamond; 39°52′52″N 112°06′28″W	Diamond	
5	Eagle and Blue Bell Mine	Eagle and Blue Bell Mine	March 14, 1979 (#79003482)	South of Eureka; 39°56′50″N 112°07′00″W	Eureka	
6	Eureka City Cemetery	Eureka City Cemetery	March 14, 1979 (#79003469)	Southwest of Eureka off U.S. Route 6; 39°56′42″N 112°08′46″W	Eureka	
7	Eureka Historic District	Eureka Historic District	March 14, 1979 (#79002514)	Roughly bounded by the city limits 39°57′19″N 112°06′55″W	Eureka	
8	Fish Springs Caves Archeological District		May 11, 1981 (#81000582)	Address Restricted	Callao	
9	Fitch Cemetery		March 14, 1979 (#79003471)	State Route 36; 39°56′14″N 112°09′07″W	Eureka	
10	Grand Central Mine		March 14, 1979 (#79003480)	North of Mammoth; 39°56′12″N 112°06′58″W	Mammoth	
11	Juab County Jail	Juab County Jail	November 20, 1987 (#87002060)	45 W. Center; 39°42′30″N 111°50′10″W	Nephi	
12	Knight Grain Elevator	Knight Grain Elevator	March 14, 1979 (#79003470)	State Route 36; 39°56′33″N 112°11′39″W	Eureka	
13	Knightsville School Foundation	Knightsville School Foundation	March 14, 1979 (#79003485)	East of Eureka; 39°57′16″N 112°05′58″W	Knightsville	
14	Mammoth Historic District	Mammoth Historic District	March 14, 1979 (#79003468)	Roughly bounded by city limits 39°55′38″N 112°07′30″W	Mammoth	
15	Nephi Mounds		September 9, 1975 (#75001808)	Address Restricted	Nephi	
16	Showers Mine and Headframe		March 14, 1979 (#79003475)	Southeast of Mammoth; 39°53′24″N 112°05′40″W	Mammoth	
17	Silver City Cemetery	Silver City Cemetery	March 14, 1979 (#79003473)	Southwest of Mammoth; 39°54′08″N 112°07′59″W	Silver City	
18	Sunbeam Mine		March 14, 1979 (#79003476)	East of Silver City; 39°54′33″N 112°06′46″W	Silver City	
19	Tintic Smelter Site	Tintic Smelter Site	March 14, 1979 (#79003472)	Off U.S. Route 6; 39°55′01″N 112°08′22″W	Silver City	
20	Union Pacific Railroad Depot	Union Pacific Railroad Depot	March 14, 1979 (#79003478)	241 W. Main St. 39°57′15″N 112°07′12″W	Eureka	Originally built in Eureka, then moved near the Dragon Mine in Silver City. Moved back to Eureka, it now houses the Tintic Mining Museum
21	US Post Office-Eureka Main	US Post Office-Eureka Main	November 27, 1989 (#89001994)	205 W. Main St. 39°57′17″N 112°07′09″W	Eureka	
22	US Post Office-Nephi Main	US Post Office-Nephi Main	November 27, 1989 (#89001996)	10 N. Main; 39°42′32″N 111°50′06″W	Nephi	
23	George Carter Whitmore Mansion	George Carter Whitmore Mansion	December 12, 1978 (#78002663)	106 S. Main; 39°42′30″N 111°50′09″W	Nephi	

== Former listing ==
	Name on the Register	Image	Date listed	Date removed	Location	City or town	Description
1	South Iron Blossom Headframe		March 14, 1979 (#79003477)	December 4, 1991	Southeast of Mammoth; 39°54′48″N 112°05′31″W	Mammoth vicinity	

== See also ==
- List of National Historic Landmarks in Utah
- National Register of Historic Places listings in Utah
