= Silver City Cemetery =

Silver City Cemetery may refer to:

- Silver City Cemetery (Tuttle, Oklahoma), listed on the National Register of Historic Places in Grady County, Oklahoma
- Silver City Cemetery (Utah), listed on the National Register of Historic Places in Juab County, Utah
- Silver City Cemetery (Lewis and Clark County, Montana)
- Silver City Cemetery (Silver City, South Dakota)

== See also ==
- Silver City Historic District (disambiguation)
