= Water Lily Shaft =

- U.S. National Register of Historic Places
- Location within Utah Location within the United States
- Nearest city: Eureka, Utah
- Coordinates: 39°59′4″N 112°3′13″W
- Area: less than one acre
- MPS: Tintic Mining District MRA
- NRHP reference No.: 79003489
- Added to NRHP: March 14, 1979

The Water Lily Shaft near Eureka, Utah was dug during 31 days in 1921 and won a "World Champion Shaft Sinking" competition. It was drilled by Walter Fitch Jr. Company using Waugh Clipper Drills, and set a record of "427.5 feet of vertical, three-compartment shaft" being dug in a 31-day period.

It was listed on the National Register of Historic Places in 1979 and is in the Tintic Mining District.
