= Knight Grain Elevator =

Histric grain elevator in Knight, Utah, United States

- U.S. National Register of Historic Places
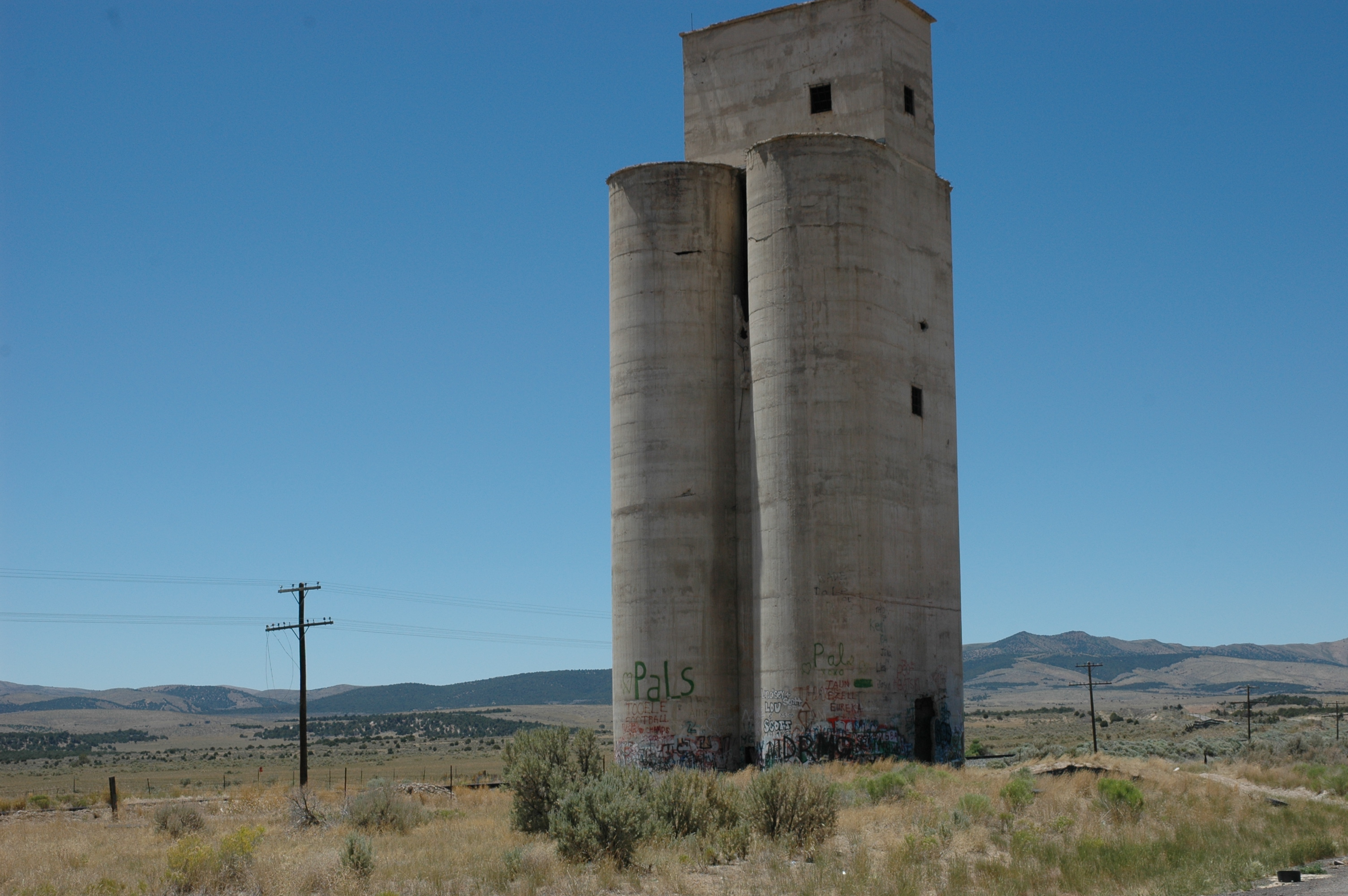
- Knight Grain Elevator, June 2012

- Location within Utah Location within the United States
- Nearest city: Eureka, Utah
- Coordinates: 39°56′33″N 112°11′39″W
- Area: less than one acre
- Built: 1915
- Built by: Union Grain & Elevator Co.
- MPS: Tintic Mining District MRA
- NRHP reference No.: 79003470
- Added to NRHP: March 14, 1979

The Knight Grain Elevator is a historic grain elevator along Utah State Route 36 in the former community of Knight, Utah, United States, that is listed on the National Register of Historic Places (NRHP). The elevator is nearly all the remains of Knight, which is located in the Tintic Valley, about 4 miles (6.4 km) west of the city of Eureka in eastern Juab County.

== Description ==
The elevator, which was built in 1915, is a 50,000 bu (150,000 mm) concrete grain elevator built by the Union Grain & Elevator Co., of the Knight investment company.

According to its NRHP nomination:

This structure was part of the Knight Farm, owned by Tintic mining entrepreneur Jesse Knight. Essentially a dry farming venture, the farm represented one of the largest in the Tintic Valley and illustrates Knight's concern and involvement in all aspects of life in a mining area from mines to power plants, mills, smelters, railroads, drain tunnels, and farming.[2]

The structure was listed on the NRHP March 14, 1979.

== See also ==
- National Register of Historic Places listings in Juab County, Utah
