= Diamond Gulch (Juab County, Utah) =

Gulch in Juab County, Utah, United States

Coordinates: 39°52′20″N 112°07′50″W

Diamond Gulch is a gulch in eastern Juab County, Utah, United States.

== Description ==
The gulch is located on the western slopes of the East Tintic Mountains. It begins at the northern base of Sunrise Peak, at the mouth of Water Canyon, at an elevation of 6,247 feet (1,904 m) From there it runs west‑southwest through the ghost town of Diamond to the base of the East Tintic Mountains. It then heads southwest through the Tintic Valley, passing under U.S. Route 6 (just south of mile marker 133) and the Union Pacific Railroad tracks (at elevation 5,633 feet [1,717 m]), until it reaches its mouth at a point about 4,600 feet (1,400 m) north of former community of McIntyre, at an elevation of 5,515 feet (1,681 m).

== See also ==
- List of valleys of Utah
