= Diamond, Utah =

- Ghost town
- Location of Diamond within the State of Utah Diamond (the United States)
- Coordinates: 39°52′54″N 112°05′51″W
- Country: United States
- State: Utah
- County: Juab
- Settled: 1870
- Named after: Quartz crystals found in the area (originally thought to be diamonds)
- Elevation: 6,253 ft (1,906 m)
- Time zone: UTC-7 (Mountain (MST))
  - Summer (DST): UTC-6 (MDT)
- GNIS feature ID: 1455093
- Diamond Cemetery
- U.S. National Register of Historic Places
- Location: Diamond, Utah; United States
- Coordinates: 39°52′52″N 112°06′28″W
- Area: 0.25 acres (0.10 ha)
- NRHP reference No.: 79003474
- Added to NRHP: March 14, 1979

Diamond is a ghost town in eastern Juab County, Utah, United States. The Diamond Cemetery is listed on the National Register of Historic Places.

== Description ==
The site of the former community is along the Diamond Gulch on the western slopes of the East Tintic Mountains, northwest of Sunrise Peak, just east of the Tintic Valley, and about 5 miles (8.0 km) south of Eureka. There are multiple abandoned mines in the surrounding area, and it is considered part of (but south of the active area of) the Tintic Mining District.

The community received its name from the quartz crystals found in the area that were originally thought to be diamonds.

== History ==
Diamond was first settled 1870 following the discovery of the "diamonds" in the area. Soon after a post office was established and saloons, stores, and even a school was built. The population eventually grew to about 900, but after water was struck in the nearby mines the last residents moved away in 1890 and the town was abandoned. However, the post office apparently remained open until 1906. The community's last house was moved in 1923. All that remains are the mining tailings and a cemetery.

== Diamond Cemetery ==
The Diamond Cemetery is a small 0.25 acres (0.10 ha) property that is the only remaining remnant of the former town of Diamond (one of the earliest mining camps in the Tintic Mining District. Very little of the original cemetery remains, but at least one gravesite is still maintained and visited by the family of Amber Rose and possibly a new addition to the cemetery in 2014. The cemetery was added to the National Register of Historic Places March 14, 1979.

== See also ==
- List of ghost towns in Utah
- National Register of Historic Places listings in Juab County, Utah
