= Eureka City Cemetery (Utah) =

Historic cemetery in Juab County, Utah

- U.S. National Register of Historic Places
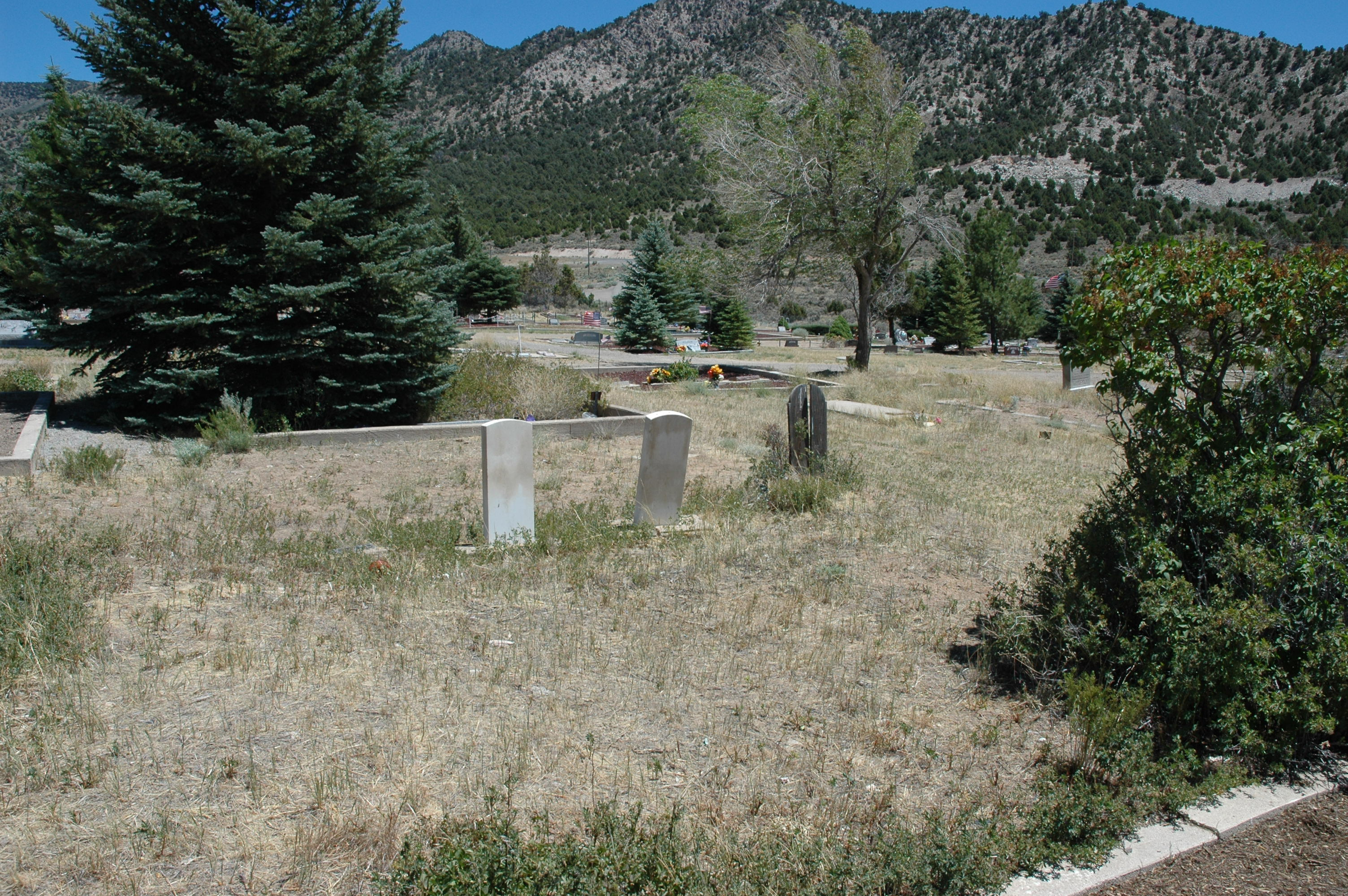
- Eureka Utah Cemetery, June 2012

- Location within Utah Location within the United States
- Nearest city: Eureka, Utah; United States
- Coordinates: 39°56′42″N 112°08′46″W
- Area: 10 acres (4.0 ha)
- Built: 1894
- MPS: Tintic Mining District MRA
- NRHP reference No.: 79003469
- Added to NRHP: March 14, 1979

The Eureka City Cemetery (or Eureka Cemetery), located west of Eureka, Utah, United States, was established at its current location in 1894 and was listed on the National Register of Historic Places (NRHP) in 1979.

== Description ==
The cemetery's NRHP nomination write-up notes that cemeteries are not usually listed on the NRHP, but asserts that, as an exception, "the Eureka Cemetery represents an integral part of.the Tintic Mining District. Its contents provide insights into the types of people, cultures and social organisations thatinhabited the area. Grave stones reveal nationality, as well as various cultural symbolisms which reflect values, dates of death also aid in identifying periods of disease and misfortune. In addition, various fraternal organizations have separate plots which aid in understanding their role as, in part, seeing to a decent burial for their members."

It is located to the west of Eureka, off U.S. Route 6.

== See also ==
- National Register of Historic Places listings in Juab County, Utah
- Fitch Cemetery, a nearby private cemetery that is also listed on the NRHP
