= Knightsville, Utah =

Knightsville, Utah Knightville
- Ghost town
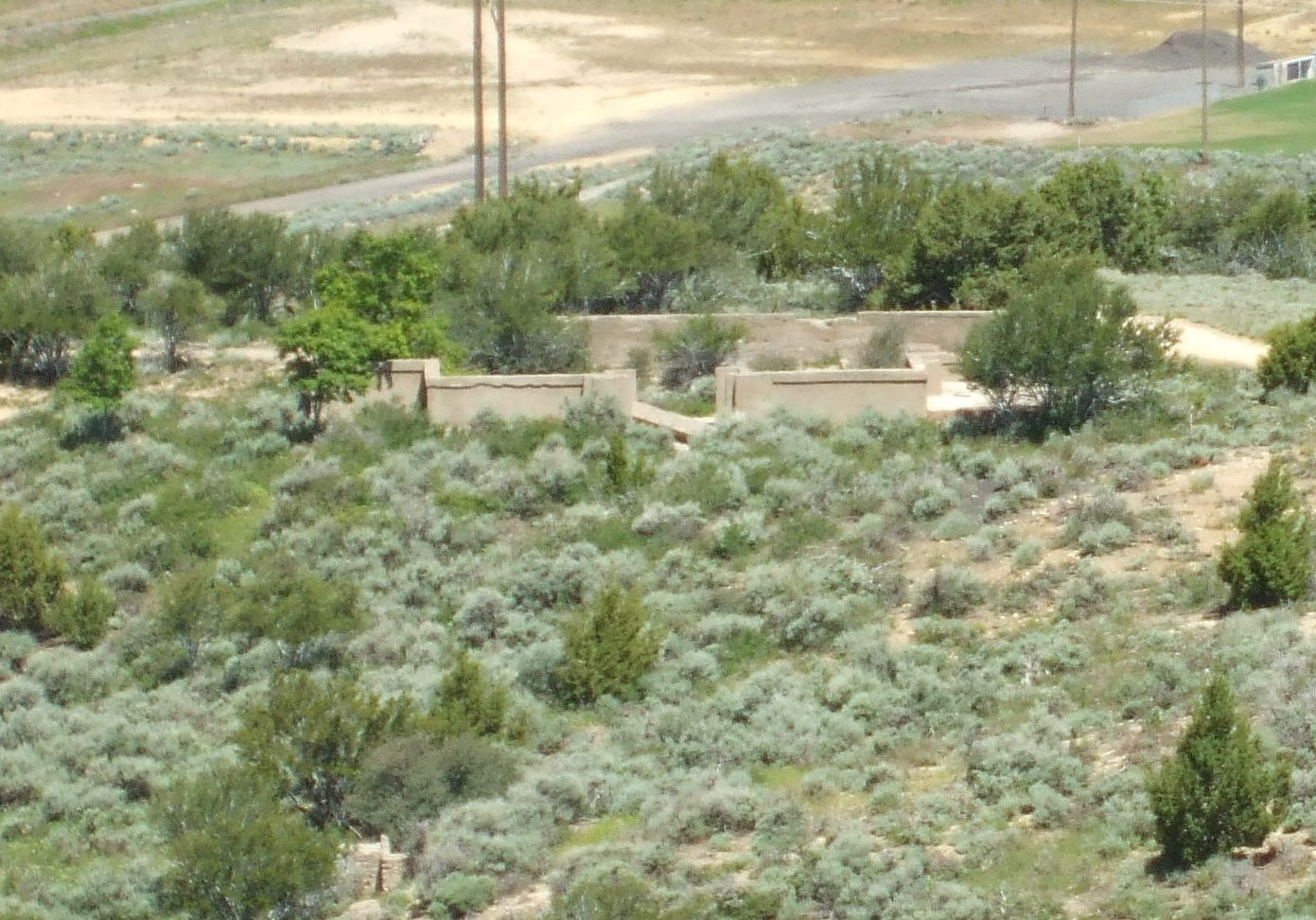
- The foundation of the Knightsville School

- Location within Utah Location within the United States
- Coordinates: 39°57′14″N 112°06′03″W
- Country: United States
- State: Utah
- County: Juab
- Established: 1896
- Abandoned: c. 1940
- Named for: Jesse Knight
- Elevation: 6,742 ft (2,055 m)
- GNIS feature ID: 1437606

Knightsville (also known as Knightville) is a ghost town located in the East Tintic Mountains on the northern slope of Godiva Mountain, approximately 2 miles (3.2 km) east of Eureka, in the northeastern corner of Juab County in central Utah, United States. A silver mining camp, Knightsville was established and operated as a company town by local mining entrepreneur Jesse Knight. The town was inhabited from 1896 until approximately 1940.

== History ==
Jesse Knight came to the Tintic Mining District in 1896, with little money and no previous mining knowledge or experience. Against the advice of experienced geologists, he sank a mine shaft that quickly reached a rich body of ore. In response to those who had doubted, he named it the Humbug Mine. Opening about a half dozen mines in the east Tintic area, Knight became one of the region's richest mine owners. His membership in the Church of Jesus Christ of Latter-day Saints was conspicuous in an industry dominated by non-Mormons, and his successes brought him the nickname "the Mormon Mining Wizard".

Knight disapproved of the drunkenness and other vices of the typical mining camp lifestyle. He decided to build his own model town to house the miners near the Humbug Mine. He started Knightsville by having 20 houses built on Godiva Mountain. He soon expanded to 65 homes and two boarding houses. There were stores, churches, hotels, and a post office. But Knightsville became known as "the only mining camp in the United States without a saloon"; as the landowner Knight would not permit a saloon to operate in town.

Residents paid taxes to Utah County until 1898, when the first precise survey of the county line showed that it ran just to the east of town. In 1899 they began paying taxes as Juab County residents.

Jesse Knight took a paternalistic attitude toward his workers and tenants. He was the first area mine owner to close his mines on Sundays, increasing daily wages to compensate for the lost day of work. He encouraged the miners, most of them Mormons, to attend church on the day off. The operation became laughingly known as the "Sunday School mines". When he learned the town's school population was too small to qualify for county funding, Knight solved the problem by hiring a father of eight. Eureka's many saloons were close by, but any employee found to be neglecting his family for liquor would be reprimanded, and even terminated if he persisted. Such policies proved attractive to many miners, who affectionally called the owner "Uncle Jesse". By 1907 the population of Knightsville grew to 1000.

=== Decline ===
In 1915, the valuable ores in Knight's mines began to run out. Some of the mines were gradually closed. Houses were moved out of Knightsville, many of them to Eureka. By 1924, only two mines were still running, and by 1940 the entire operation was closed down. The site of Knightsville was emptied. Today nothing remains but some assorted debris and the Knightsville schoolhouse foundation, which is listed on the National Register of Historic Places.

== See also ==
- List of ghost towns in Utah
- Tintic Standard Reduction Mill
