= Mammoth, Utah =

Unincorporated community in Utah, United States

- Unincorporated Community
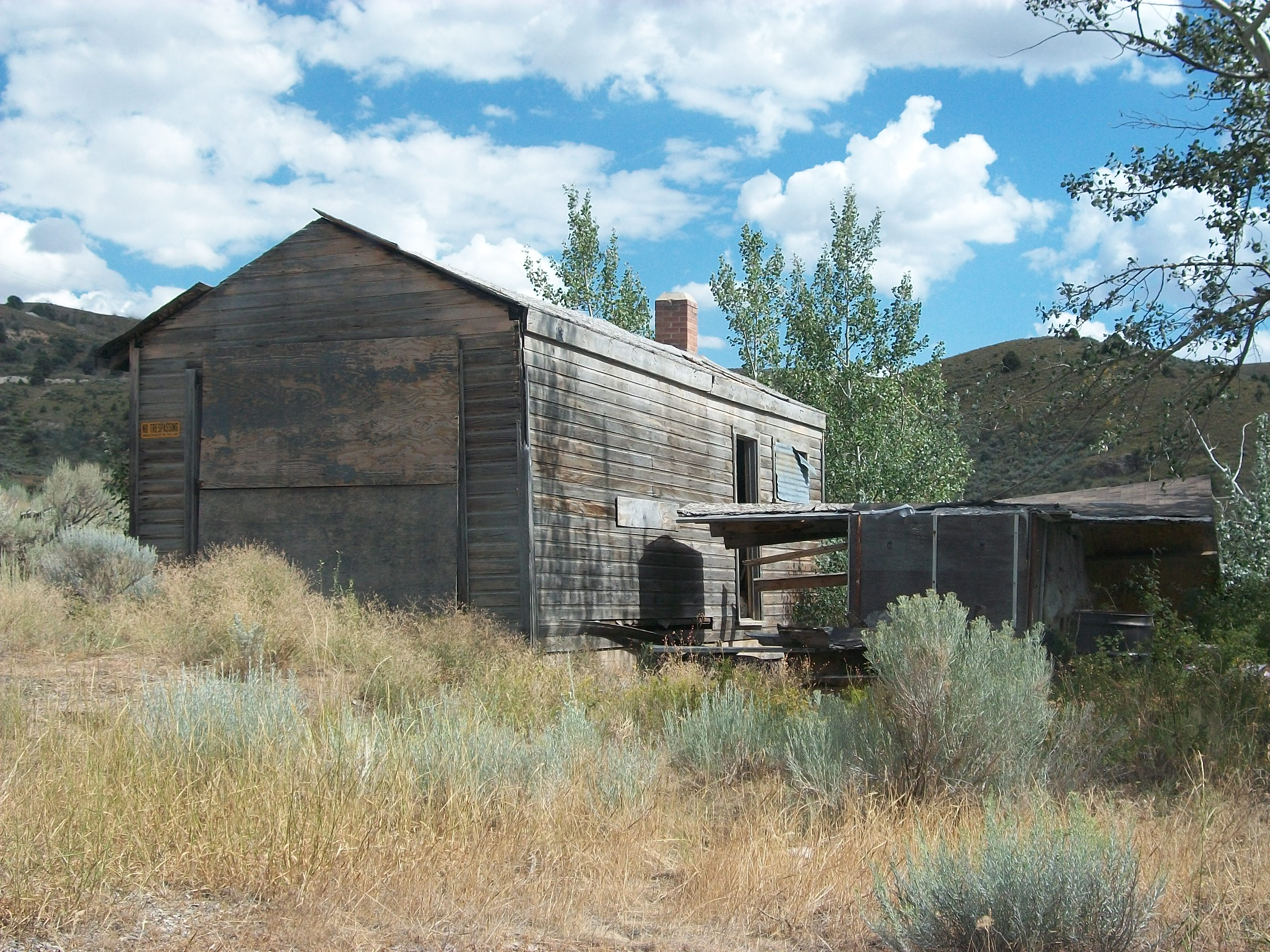
- A home in Mammoth, October 2010

- Location within Utah Location within the United States
- Coordinates: 39°55′38″N 112°07′26″W
- Country: United States
- State: Utah
- County: Juab
- Founded: 1870
- Named after: Mammoth Mine
- Elevation: 6,391 ft (1,948 m)
- GNIS feature ID: 1451119
- Mammoth Historic District
- U.S. National Register of Historic Places
- U.S. Historic district
- Location: Mammoth, Utah; United States
- Coordinates: 39°55′38″N 112°07′30″W
- Area: Approximately 170 acres (69 ha)
- NRHP reference No.: 79003468
- Added to NRHP: March 14, 1979

Mammoth is an unincorporated community and semi-ghost town in northeastern Juab County, Utah, United States.

== Description ==
The town lies in Mammoth Canyon on the west flank of the East Tintic Mountains, approximately 1.5 miles (2.4 km) west of Mammoth Peak, at an elevation of 6,391 feet (1,948 m). It is about 3 miles (4.8 km) south of Eureka and 2 miles (3.2 km) east of the Tintic Junction. Mammoth was founded circa 1870 during the boom and bust mining cycle of the American West. The name for the town comes from the Mammoth Mine located near the area.

== History ==
The Mammoth Mine was discovered around the same time as the settlement of Eureka in February 1870. Miners rushed in and began a boomtown. The area was remote and the environment harsh; no water was to be found nearby. The mines piped in water for industrial use, but residents had to buy drinking water for ten cents a gallon.

Mines in the area around Mammoth produced ore, silver, and gold. The Mammoth Mine was in production for around seventy-five years. Considered part of the Tintic Mining District, with other communities and mines in the area, the area around Mammoth played a vital role in the mining economy of the Utah Territory and later the State of Utah.

Activity in Mammoth peaked around 1900–1910, with a population of 2500–3000. The town had a school, four large hotels, and other businesses typical of a town its size. Mammoth was officially incorporated in 1910, but began to decline soon after. By 1930 the population was down to 750, the town having disincorporated on 29 November 1929.

Today, some residents still consider Mammoth home. There is some smaller scale mining that goes on in the area today for metals.

The area is also popular with ghost town enthusiasts, campers, off-road vehicle riders, and hikers.

== Notable people ==
- Tristram Coffin (1909–1990), western actor and star of the syndicated 26 Men television series, was born in Mammoth.
- Marion Mack (8 April 1902 - 1 May 1989), silent era actress best known for her work in the film classic The General, was born in Mammoth.

== See also ==
- List of ghost towns in Utah
- National Register of Historic Places listings in Juab County, Utah
- Tintic Standard Reduction Mill
