= Juab =

Juab may refer to:

- Juab County, Utah
  - Juab, Utah, an unincorporated community in Juab County
  - the Juab Valley, in Juab County
  - Juab High School
  - Juab School District
  - Juab County Jail
