= Tintic Smelter Site =

- U.S. National Register of Historic Places
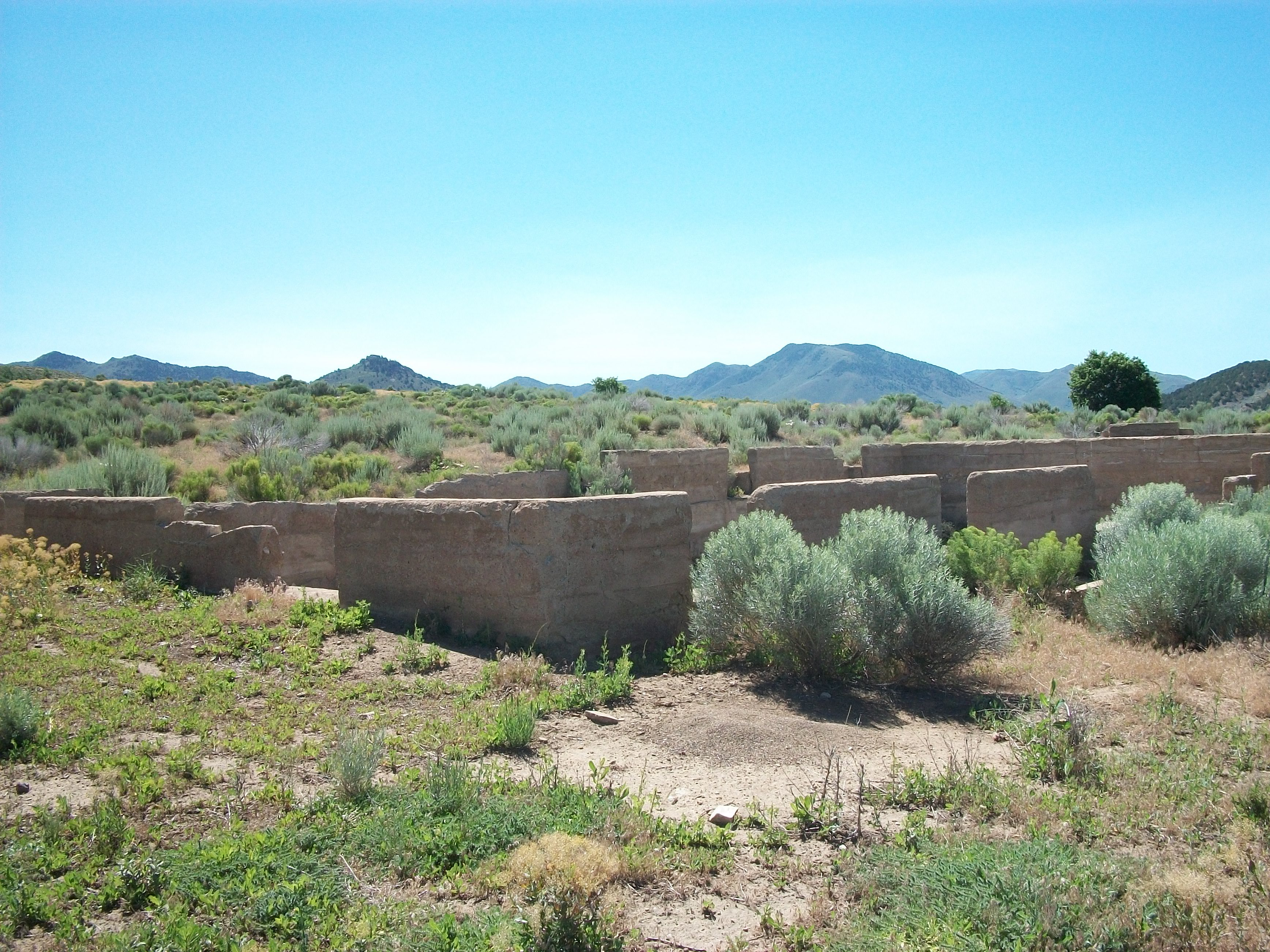

- Location within Utah Location within the United States
- Nearest city: Eureka, Utah
- Coordinates: 39°55′01″N 112°08′22″W
- Area: 5 acres (2.0 ha)
- Built: 1908
- MPS: Tintic Mining District MRA
- NRHP reference No.: 79003472
- Added to NRHP: March 14, 1979

The Tintic Smelter Site, located off U.S. Route 6 near Silver City, Utah, United States, that is listed on the National Register of Historic Places (NRHP).

== Description ==
The site is one of few legacies of historic Silver City, a mining boom town in the 1870s.

The site is described as being an "approximately five acre site containing slag and tailings dumps, as well as remnants of the concrete foundations of the Tintic Smelter and Tintic Mill." The Tintic Smelter was "built in 1908, dismantled in 1915, and replaced that year by the Tintic Mill.

It was described as significant for aiding "in the documentation of the history of smelters and mills in Tintic Mining District. The Tintic Smelter, built by Jesse Knight, was constructed to combat high smelting rates of the 1908 period; and it resulted in lower rates by Salt Lake Valley smelters. The Knight-Dern Mill (Tintic Mill) was built as a joint venture by Jesse Knight and George Dern (Utah Governor, 1925–1933, and Secretary of War under Franklin D. Roosevelt). The mill utilized the Holt-Dern method of roasting ore in processing and received ores from throughout the western states."

The Sunbeam Mine and the Silver City Cemetery, both also associated with Silver City, were also listed on the National Register on the same day.

It was listed on the NRHP March 14, 1979.

== See also ==
- Tintic Standard Reduction Mill, in Genola, Utah County, also known as "Tintic Mill"
- National Register of Historic Places listings in Juab County, Utah
