= Fitch Cemetery =

Historic site in Juab County, Utah, US

- U.S. National Register of Historic Places
- Location within Utah Location within the United States
- Nearest city: Eureka, Utah; United States
- Coordinates: 39°56′14″N 112°09′07″W
- Area: 0.5 acres (0.20 ha)
- Built: 1920
- MPS: Tintic Mining District MRA
- NRHP reference No.: 79003471
- Added to NRHP: March 14, 1979

The Fitch Cemetery, located west of Eureka, Utah, United States, was established in 1920 and was listed on the National Register of Historic Places in 1979.

== Description ==
The cemetery is a private cemetery, which is not typically eligible for National Register listing. But the 1977 nomination asserts that "the Fitch burial area represents a most unique factor in U. S. mining history; namely, the fact that an entrepreneurial family not only lived in the locale of their mine but also are buried there. In fact, in 1975 a member died in New York, and the remains were flown to Utah for interment at the family cemetery."

The cemetery includes a headstone for Walter Fitch (1854-1937) and Exilda Fitch (1857-1948).

It is located on just off U.S. Route 6, but is more easily accessed by heading north off Utah State Route 36.

== See also ==
- National Register of Historic Places listings in Juab County, Utah
- Eureka City Cemetery (Utah), Eureka's nearby cemetery that is also listed on the NRHP
