= Gold chain mine =

Mine in Utah, U.S.

Gold Chain
- Interactive map of Gold Chain
- Location: Juab County, Utah, United States; 39.92828°N 112.11189°W
- Products: gold, lead, zinc, copper, silver

The Gold Chain mine is a mine located in Juab County, Utah and owned by the Gold Chain Mining Company and operated by the Mammoth Mining Company. It mines commodities such as gold, lead, zinc, copper, and silver. The mine had received a revenue of US$3,000,000 from 1899 to 1917. The mine had a length of 1 mile (1.6 km) and a depth of 980 feet (300 m).
