= Silver City Cemetery (Utah) =

- U.S. National Register of Historic Places
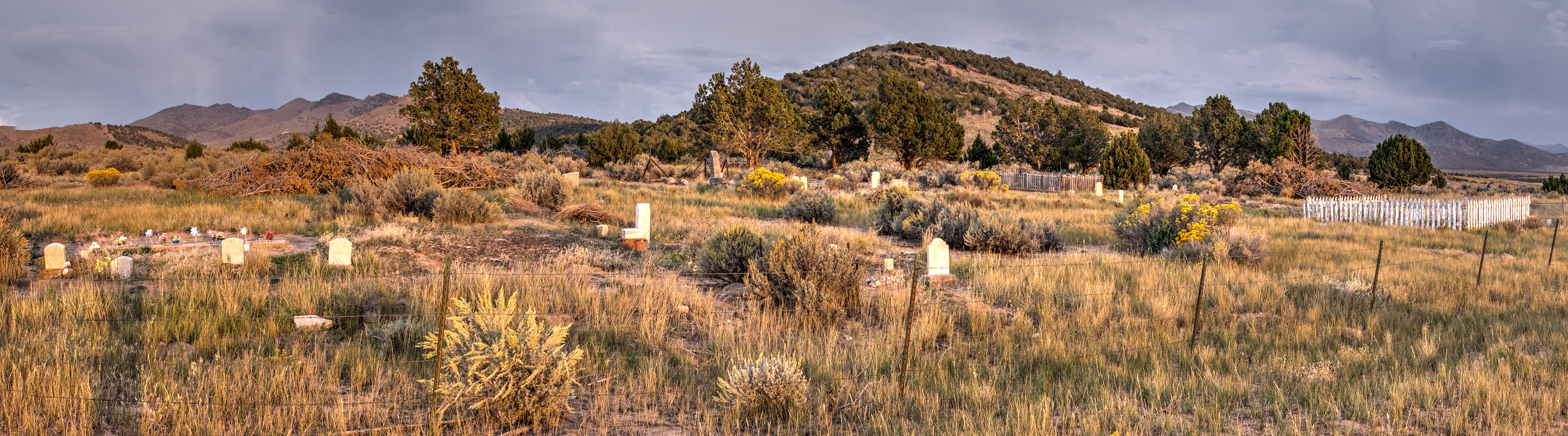

- Location within Utah Location within the United States
- Nearest city: Mammoth, Utah
- Coordinates: 39°54′08″N 112°07′59″W
- Area: less than one acre
- Built: c. 1870s
- MPS: Tintic Mining District MRA
- NRHP reference No.: 79003473
- Added to NRHP: March 14, 1979

The Silver City Cemetery, is a historic cemetery in the ghost town of Silver City, Utah, United States, that dates from the 1870s and is listed on the National Register of Historic Places (NRHP).

== Description ==
The cemetery was deemed significant for its information potential and "as the only remaining evidence of Silver City, at one time (1870–1880s) the Tintic Mining District's center. Grave sites help to document the history of the peoples and cultures of the town."

It is located south of Eureka, Utah about 0.5 miles (0.80 km) east of U.S. Route 6.

It was listed on the NRHP March 14, 1979. The Sunbeam Mine and the Tintic Smelter Site, also legacies of Silver City, were also listed on the NRHP on the same day.

== See also ==
- List of cemeteries in Utah
- National Register of Historic Places listings in Juab County, Utah
