= George Carter Whitmore Mansion =

- Whitmore, George Carter, Mansion
- U.S. National Register of Historic Places
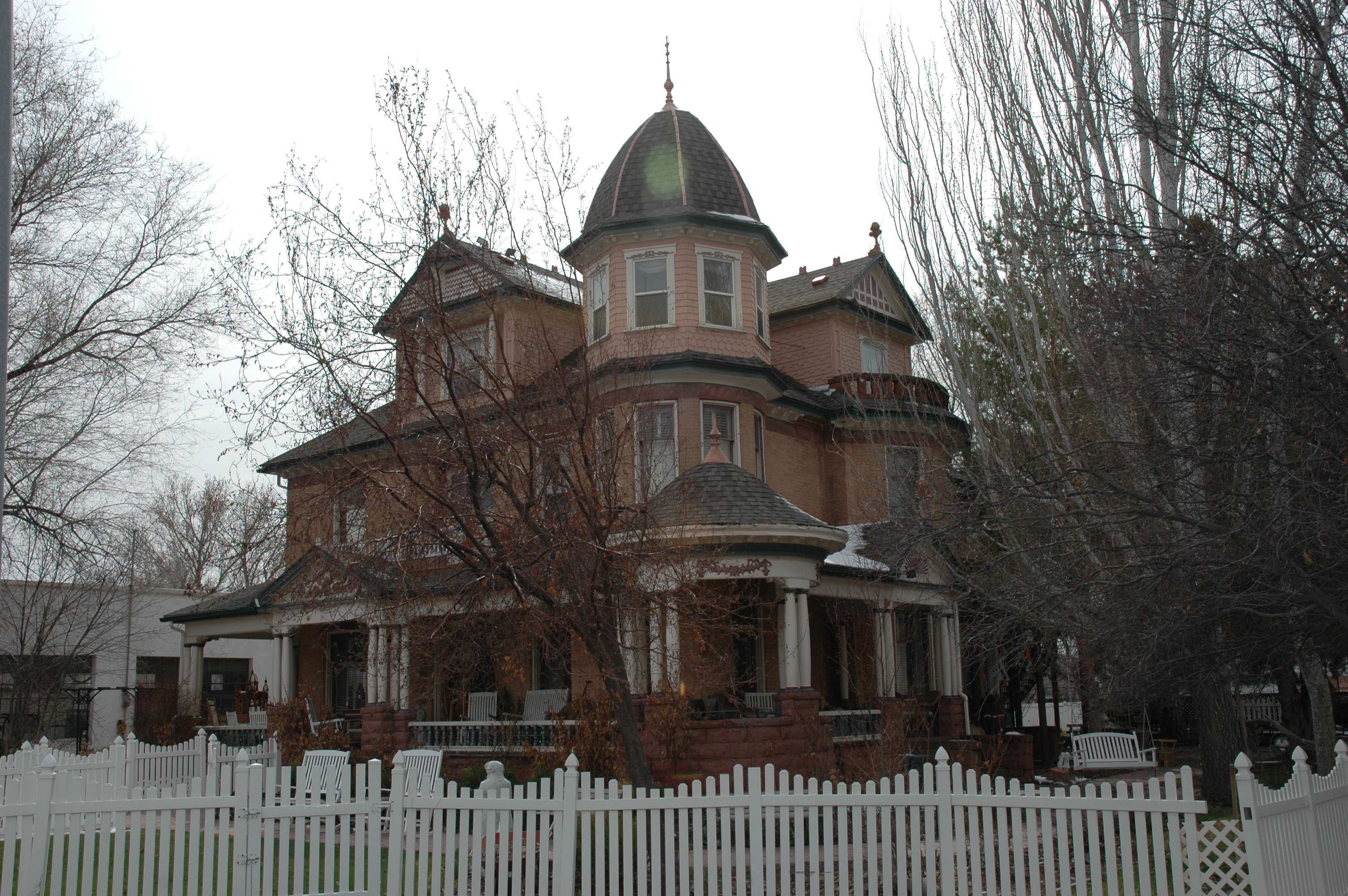
- The house in 2010

- Location within Utah Location within the United States
- Location: 106 South Main, Nephi, Utah
- Coordinates: 39°42′30″N 111°50′09″W
- Area: less than one acre
- Built: 1898
- Architect: Oscar Booth
- Architectural style: Queen Anne, Queen Anne-Eastlake
- NRHP reference No.: 78002663
- Added to NRHP: December 12, 1978

The George Carter Whitmore Mansion is a historic house in Nephi, Utah. It was built in 1898 for George Carter Whitmore, who founded the First National Bank of Nephi and served as a Democratic member of the Utah Senate from 1900 to 1908. The house was designed in the Queen Anne and Eastlake styles by architect Oscar Booth. Whitmore, his wife née Mary Elizabeth Hague, and their eight children, lived here until his death in 1917. It was inherited by one of his sons, George M. Whitmore. It has been listed on the National Register of Historic Places since December 12, 1978.
