= Stockton Jail =

- U.S. National Register of Historic Places
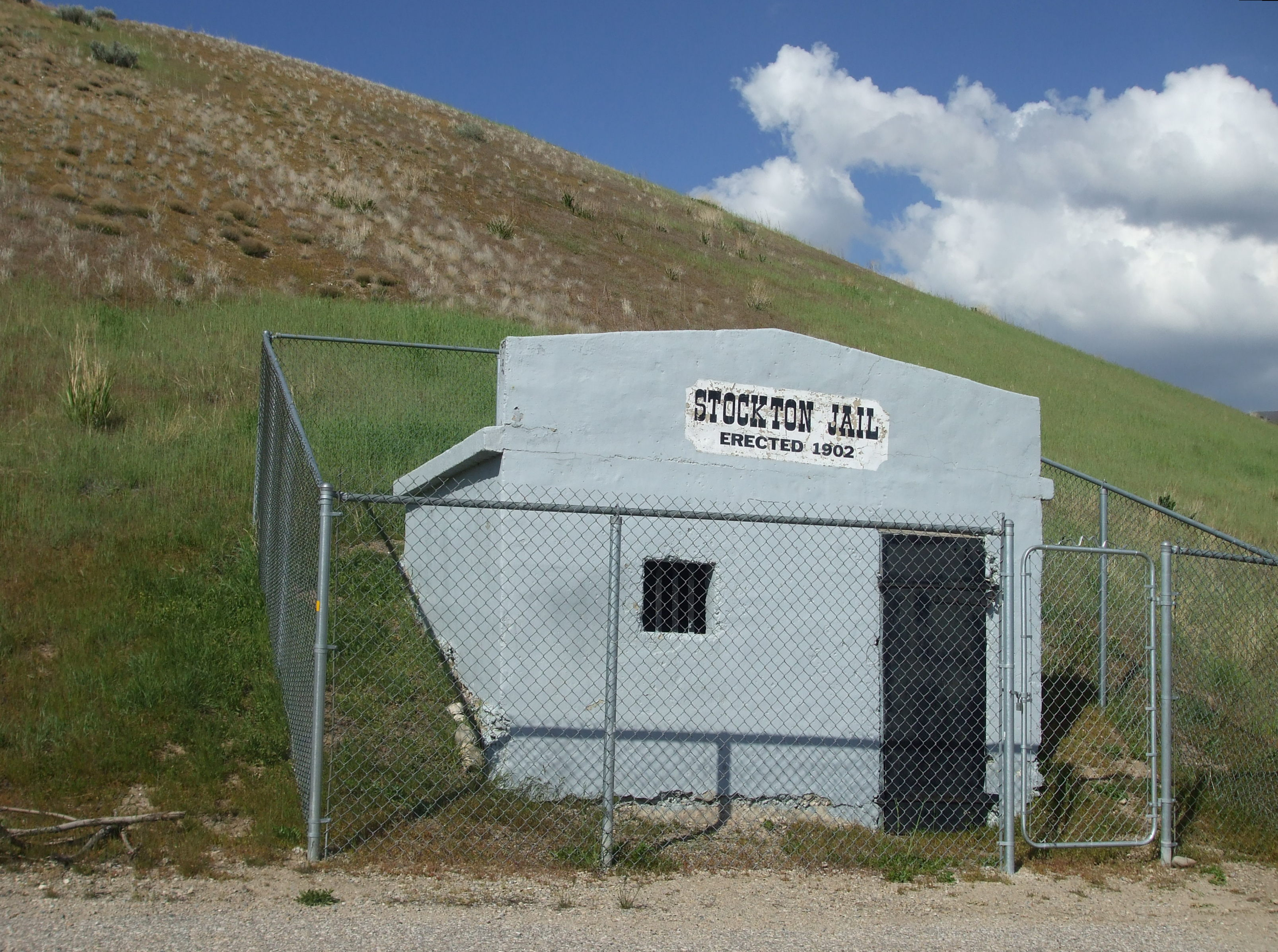
- Photo in 2010

- Location within Utah Location within the United States
- Location: 38 W. Clark St., Stockton, Utah
- Coordinates: 40°27′14″N 112°21′47″W
- Area: less than one acre
- Built: 1902
- NRHP reference No.: 85000965
- Added to NRHP: May 9, 1985

The Stockton Jail, in Stockton, Utah, is an historic jail that was built in 1902, after Stockton was incorporated in 1901. The jail was listed on the National Register of Historic Places (NRHP) in 1985.

The building is merely 12 by 14 feet (3.7 m × 4.3 m) large, divided into three compartments. It is made with concrete walls and roof and has a "false front" parapet. At the time of its NRHP listing it was well preserved. A 2010 photo shows it has been protected by a chain link fence. It is historically significant as the only surviving building associated with early enforcement of the law in Stockton, and it is believed to be the best preserved local public building from its era.

It is one of just 23 NRHP-listed properties in Tooele County, Utah, a 7,287 square-mile large county which thus has more than 300 square miles per NRHP listing. To become NRHP-listed, a property must be nominated and receive local, state, and national level approvals for its historic significance.

== See also ==
- Juab County Jail, NRHP-listed in Juab County, Utah
