= Stockton, Utah =

Town in the state of Utah, United States

- Town
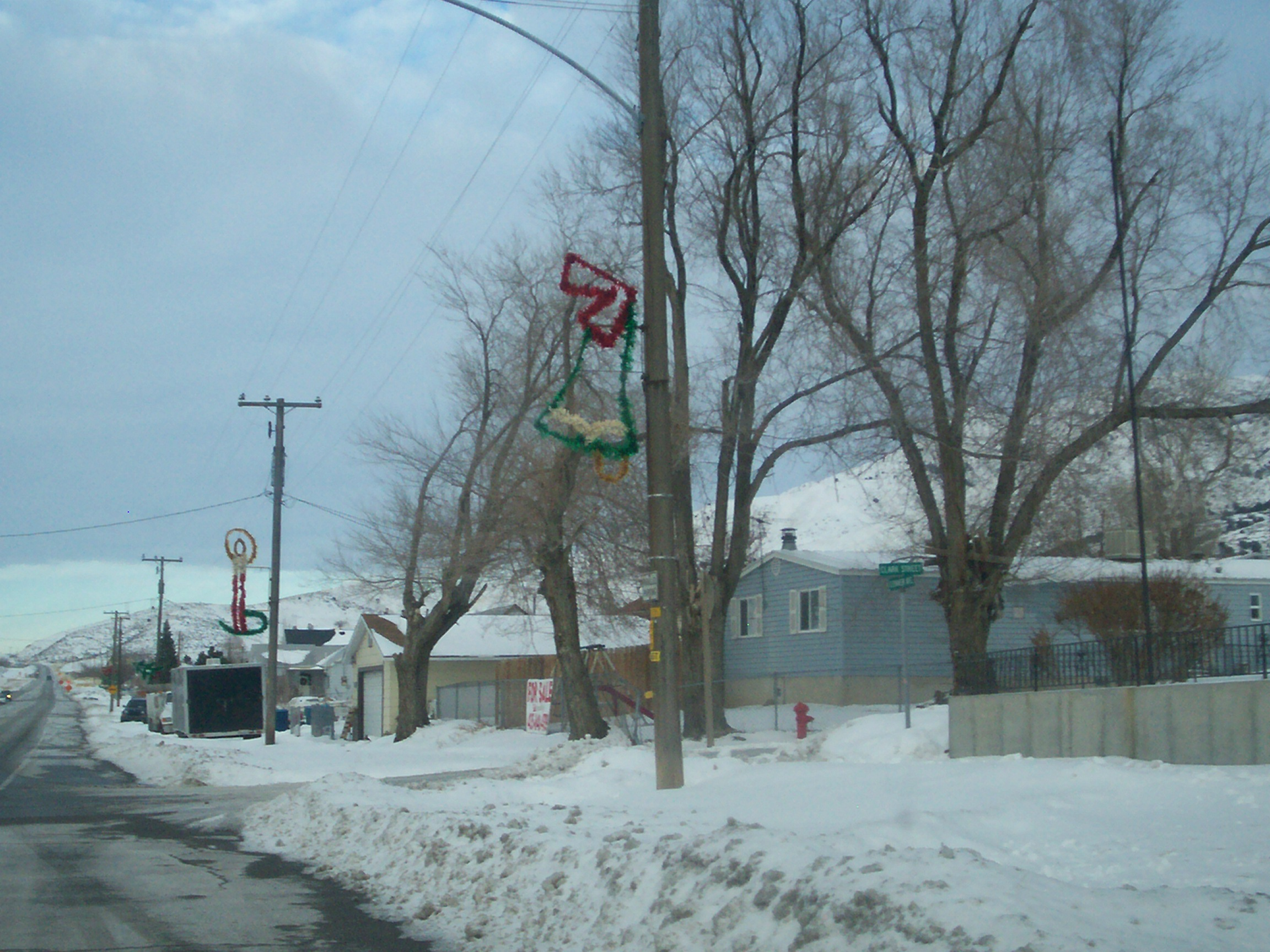
- Main Street in winter
- Interactive map of Stockton
- Location within Utah Location within the United States
- Coordinates: 40°26′45″N 112°22′20″W
- Country: United States
- State: Utah
- County: Tooele County
- Settled: 1863
- Incorporated: 1901
- Named for: Stockton, California

Government
  - Type: Mayor/Council

Area
  - Total: 1.69 sq mi (4.38 km^{2})
  - Land: 1.68 sq mi (4.36 km^{2})
  - Water: 0.0077 sq mi (0.02 km^{2})
- Elevation: 5,013 ft (1,528 m)

Population (2020)
  - Total: 621
  - Density: 369/sq mi (142/km^{2})
- Time zone: UTC-7 (Mountain (MST))
  - Summer (DST): UTC-6 (MDT)
- ZIP code: 84071
- Area code: 435
- FIPS code: 49-73050
- GNIS feature ID: 2413337
- Website: stockton.utah.gov

Stockton is a town in Tooele County, Utah, United States. It is part of the Salt Lake City, Utah Metropolitan Statistical Area. As of the 2020 census, Stockton had a population of 621.

== History ==
Stockton was born of the first mining boom in the Utah Territory. The mining industry began in the early 1860s with the arrival of Col. Patrick E. Connor, commander of the Third California Volunteers, who had been sent to the territory in 1862 to keep an eye on the overland mail routes during the Civil War. Connor wanted to counterbalance his perceived dominance of Mormon leaders in the area by exploring and developing the territory's mineral wealth. He posited that if precious metals could be discovered in Utah, the resulting flood of miners into the territory would overwhelm the Mormons, and outsiders would balance the Church's power. So he sent the men under his command out to prospect, and they almost singlehandedly opened the precious metals industry in Utah in 1863 by locating deposits, staking claims, and establishing mining districts. Mines were dug on the western slopes of the Oquirrh Mountains, and Stockton became a base camp for some these operations.

The small town was first settled in 1863. Under the growing influence of the mining industry, the population swelled to 4,000 residents. It was the first town in the Utah Territories to have its streets surveyed and named, and it later gained the distinction of being the first to get electric lights, and the first to get a telephone. A town cemetery (northwest of the settlement) was created shortly into the twentieth century. Other amenities were slowly addressed, and they now include a ball diamond, a city park, a city hall, a fire station, a municipal water system, and a centralized wastewater collection/disposal system.

A sesquicentennial commemoration was held on April 27, 2013, to mark the town's founding. Part of the ceremony was the unveiling of a welcome sign, mounted on the north end town and visible from the main highway through the town's business district, SR-36.

== Government ==
The town is led by a Mayor and a Town Council.

- At the end of 2025, the following departments or personnel are also in existence:
- Town Clerk (part-time employee)
- Town Treasurer (part-time employee)
- Town Attorney (on retainer)
- Planning and Zoning Commission (5 volunteer members)
- Fire Department (all volunteers)
- Public Works (one full-time employee)
- Watermaster (one full-time employee)

Stockton made headlines in October 2009 after Mayor Dan Rydalch fired one of the town's five police officers for issuing his son a traffic citation. The officers were conducting a sobriety checkpoint, and the mayor accused the officer of violating checkpoint procedures. The city council voted to reinstate the officer with back pay. Later in 2009, Ryldach lost his bid for reelection by a 3 to 1 vote margin.

== Geography ==
According to the United States Census Bureau, the town has a total area of 0.9 square mile (2.4 km^{2}), all land.

== Demographics ==
Historical population
Census	Pop.	Note	%±
1870	80		—
1880	515		543.8%
1890	326		−36.7%
1900	443		35.9%
1910	258		−41.8%
1920	238		−7.8%
1930	351		47.5%
1940	332		−5.4%
1950	414		24.7%
1960	362		−12.6%
1970	469		29.6%
1980	437		−6.8%
1990	426		−2.5%
2000	443		4.0%
2010	616		39.1%
2020	621		0.8%
U.S. Decennial Census

As of the census of 2010, there were 616 people, 216 households, and 173 families residing in the town. The population density was 596.7 people per square mile (256.7/km^{2}). There were 237 housing units at an average density of 213.3 per square mile (98.8/km^{2}). The racial makeup of the town was 96.6% White, 0.6% Native American, 1.7% from other races, and 1.3% from two or more races. Hispanic or Latino of any race were 6.7% of the population.

There were 216 households, out of which 38.0% had children under the age of 18 living with them, 64.8% were married couples living together, 7.4% had a female householder with no husband present, and 19.9% were non-families. 16.2% of all households were made up of individuals, and 3.7% had someone living alone who was 65 years of age or older. The average household size was 2.85 and the average family size was 3.18.

In the town, the population was spread out, with 23.7% age 14 and younger, 11.2% from 15 to 24, 25.1% from 25 to 44, 29.7% from 45 to 64, and 10.3% who were 65 years of age or older. The median age was 36.8 years. Total males were 52.4%.

As of 2000, the median income for a household in the town was $40,938, and the median income for a family was $45,179. Males had a median income of $36,250 versus $25,000 for females. The per capita income for the town was $15,894. About 7.2% of families and 6.6% of the population were below the poverty line, including 4.9% of those under age 18 and 8.9% of those age 65 or over.

== See also ==
- Stockton Jail
