= Knightsville School Foundation =

- U.S. National Register of Historic Places
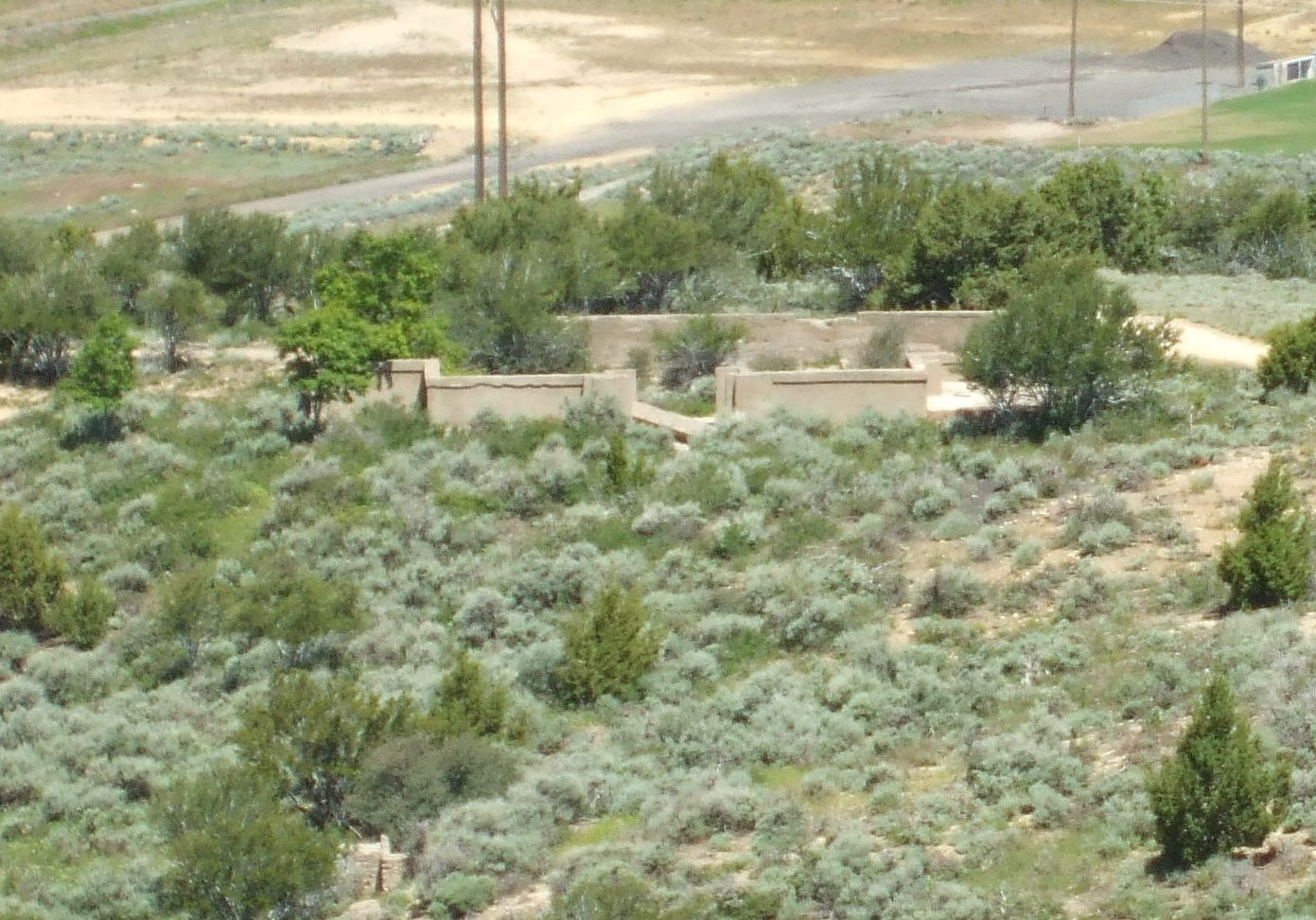

- Location within Utah
- Nearest city: Eureka, Utah
- Coordinates: 39°57′16″N 112°05′58″W
- Area: less than one acre
- Built: 1909
- MPS: Tintic Mining District MRA
- NRHP reference No.: 79003485
- Added to NRHP: March 14, 1979

The Knightsville School Foundation, in Knightsville, Utah near Eureka, Utah, is the ruin of a historic school built in 1909. It was listed on the National Register of Historic Places in 1979.

The foundation is about 40 by 40 feet (12 m × 12 m) in plan.

It was deemed significant as "the only remnant of Knightsville, founded in 1896-1897, reportedly the only privately owned, saloon-free, prostitute-free mining town in the United States (because of its founder Jesse Knight, an ardent Mormon). The school was built in 1909, contracted by one Martin E. Andersen of Logan, Utah, and the foundation was made of gravel and rock from the Mayday Mine dump (on the hill west of the town)."
