= Joy, Utah =

Ghost town in Utah

- Unincorporated community
- Location within Utah Location within the United States
- Coordinates: 39°34′21″N 113°3′30″W
- Country: United States
- State: Utah
- County: Juab
- Settled: 1872
- Elevation: 5,919 ft (1,804 m)
- Time zone: UTC-7 (Mountain (MST))
  - Summer (DST): UTC-6 (MDT)
- GNIS feature ID: 39425

Joy is a ghost town in eastern Juab County, Utah, United States. It's was settled in 1872.

== History ==
Officially founded in the 1870s by two mining engineers (Harry Joy and Charles Howard). The area was extremely rich in valuable minerals, attracting miners in search of gold, silver, and copper. The Black Boy Mine complex begins full-scale operations, becoming the city's main economic driver due to the massive extraction of manganese.

A post office operated from 1899 to 1919.

=== Last Resident ===
The last resident was Mary Alice Ann Devitt Leair, widely known as "No-Nose Maggie".

== See also ==
- List of ghost towns in Utah
