= Pleasant Valley Draw =

Stream in Juab County, Utah, U.S.

Pleasant Valley Draw is a stream, in the lower end of Pleasant Valley, that has its source and has its mouth in Juab County, Utah. The source of Pleasant Valley Draw is located at an elevation of 5,710 feet (1,740 meters) at 39°38′27″N 114°01′06″W. Its mouth is found at an elevation of 5,236 feet (1,596 meters) lower in Pleasant Valley, in Utah.
