= Silver City, Utah =

- Ghost town
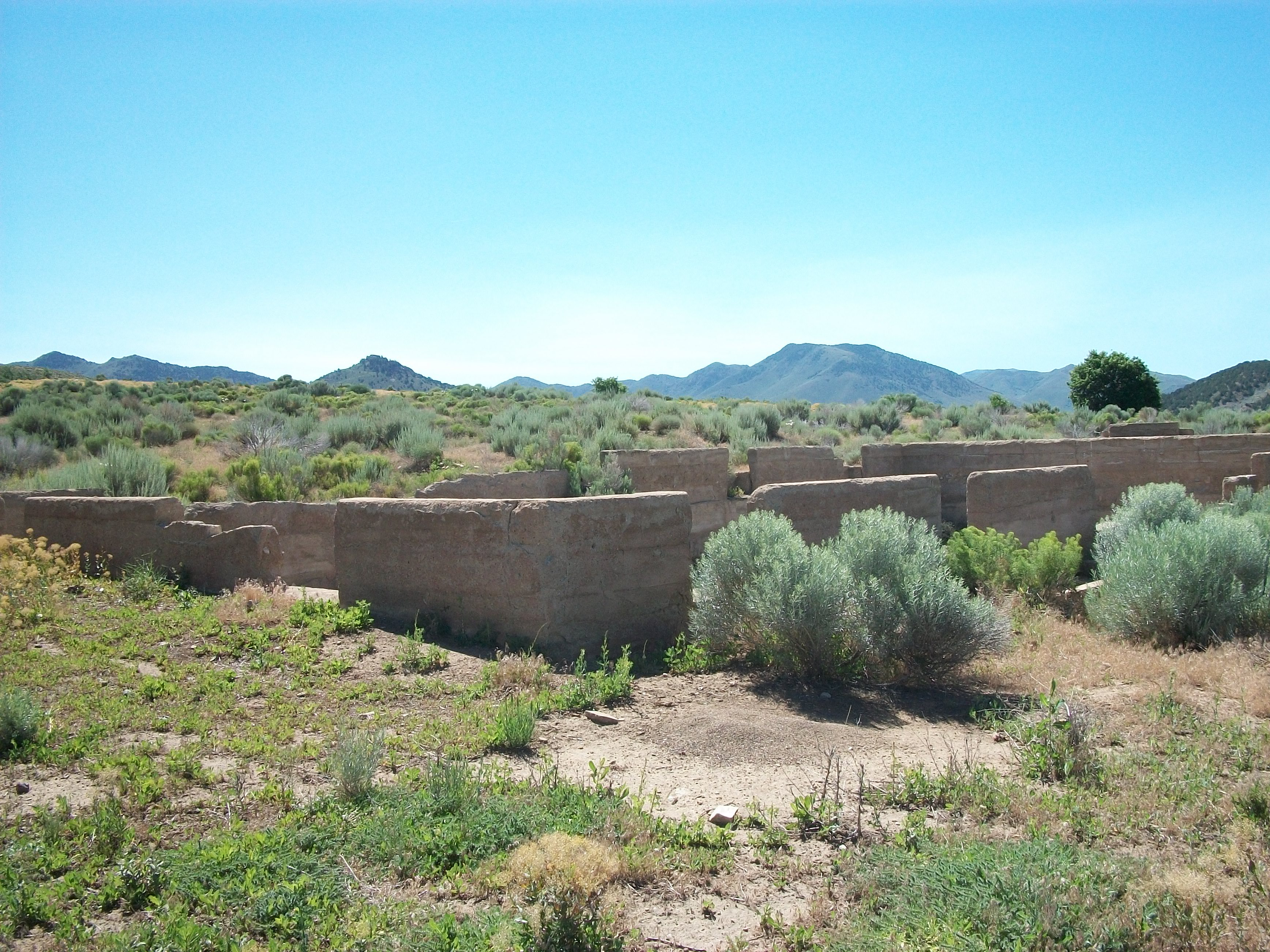
- Foundation of the smelter in Silver City

- Location within Utah Location within the United States
- Coordinates: 39°54′36″N 112°07′48″W
- Country: United States
- State: Utah
- County: Juab
- Established: 1869
- Abandoned: c. 1940
- Elevation: 6,158 ft (1,877 m)
- GNIS feature ID: 1437686

Silver City is a ghost town located at the mouth of Dragon Canyon on the west flank of the East Tintic Mountains in northeast Juab County in central Utah, United States. It was a silver mining town approximately 90 miles (140 km) south-southwest of Salt Lake City. This area was considered part of the Tintic Mining District and also produced bismuth, copper, gold, and lead. Settlement began with the first mining strikes here in 1869. Silver City was inhabited until 1930, after the mines played out. Jesse Knight, known as the "Mormon Wizard" for his ability to find ore easily, decided to build a smelter in Silver City because it had the flattest ground in all of the Tintic Mining District. Silver City had several mines in 1890, but the mines hit water and were abandoned. Now there is little left other than a few holes where mines were, and a number of tailings piles. The Silver City Cemetery, however, survives and is listed on the National Register of Historic Places.

== History ==
In 1869, a cowboy prospector named George Rust discovered the remains of old Native American mines in Dragon Canyon. By December a large claim known as the Sunbeam Mine was located here, and a new mining camp went up quickly as the rich mines multiplied. Growth soon slowed, however, as miners were drawn away by tales of spectacular strikes in Alta and Park City.

Lacking the placer deposits of many Utah mines, extracting Silver City's riches required labor-intensive hard rock mining. Early on, mine owners lacked capital and could develop the mines only slowly. Gradually the town grew from a mere tent city with a saloon and a blacksmith shop, to include a claims recorder and assay office, a telegraph branch, stagecoach line, and post office, and eventually numerous stores, hotels, and restaurants. There were even two railroad depots, as both the Salt Lake & Western Railroad and the Tintic Range Railroad ran lines into town. Economic conditions improved, and by 1899 Silver City's population reached 800.

In the 1890s, just as the mine companies seemed to be locating the richest ore bodies, a new difficulty stood in their way: the mine shafts started filling with water. While the richest mines continued operating with the help of expensive pumps, Silver City began to dwindle as the more marginal mines flooded and closed. Miners left in even greater numbers after the town was devastated by fire in 1902. In 1904 Silver City had a total of 18 businesses.

In 1907 Jesse Knight, already a successful mine owner in the Tintic area, revitalized Silver City by establishing the Utah Ore Sampling Company and the Tintic smelter here. He nearly transformed Silver City into a company town, but for the fact that he didn't own the land. Knight built a power plant, some 100 new homes, and yet another railroad, called the Eureka Hill Railroad. By 1908 Silver City's population surged to its peak of 1500, most of them Knight employees. That year the town held a special celebration called "Smelter Day" in conjunction with Utah's annual Pioneer Day holiday.

Silver City's resurgence was short-lived. Due to dropping freight rates, Knight's smelter proved unable to compete with those in the Salt Lake Valley. Records show that by 1912 the population was already down to 300, and there were only 8 businesses left. In 1915 the smelter was shut down and moved to Murray. Silver City's decline is often considered to have been complete by 1930, but it was still a separate precinct in the 1940 census, which recorded a population of 111. Today it is uninhabited.

== See also ==
- List of ghost towns in Utah
- Tintic Standard Reduction Mill
