= Juab County Jail =

- U.S. National Register of Historic Places
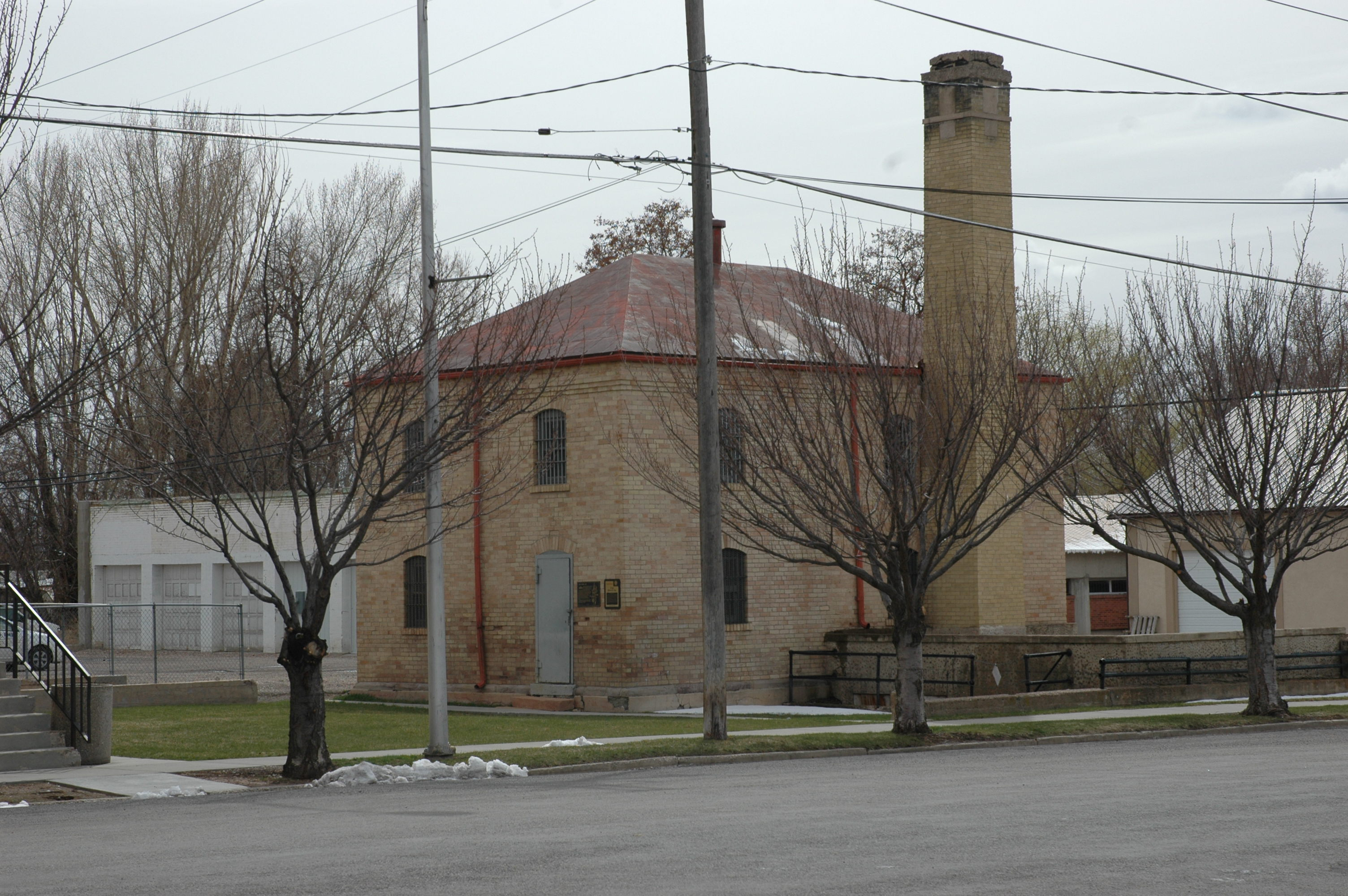

- Location within Utah Location within the United States
- Location: 45 W. Center, Nephi, Utah
- Coordinates: 39°42′30″N 111°50′10″W
- Area: less than one acre
- Built: 1892
- Architectural style: Prairie School
- NRHP reference No.: 87002060
- Added to NRHP: November 20, 1987

The Juab County Jail, located at 45 W. Center in Nephi, in Juab County, Utah, was built in 1892 and served as the main jail in the county for more than 80 years. It is a two-story structure and is one of the biggest and best preserved jails from the early 20th century or before that survives in the state of Utah.

It was listed on the National Register of Historic Places in 1987.

== See also ==
- Stockton Jail, NRHP-listed in Tooele County, Utah
