= United States Post Office-Springville Main =

- U.S. Post Office-Springville Main
- U.S. National Register of Historic Places
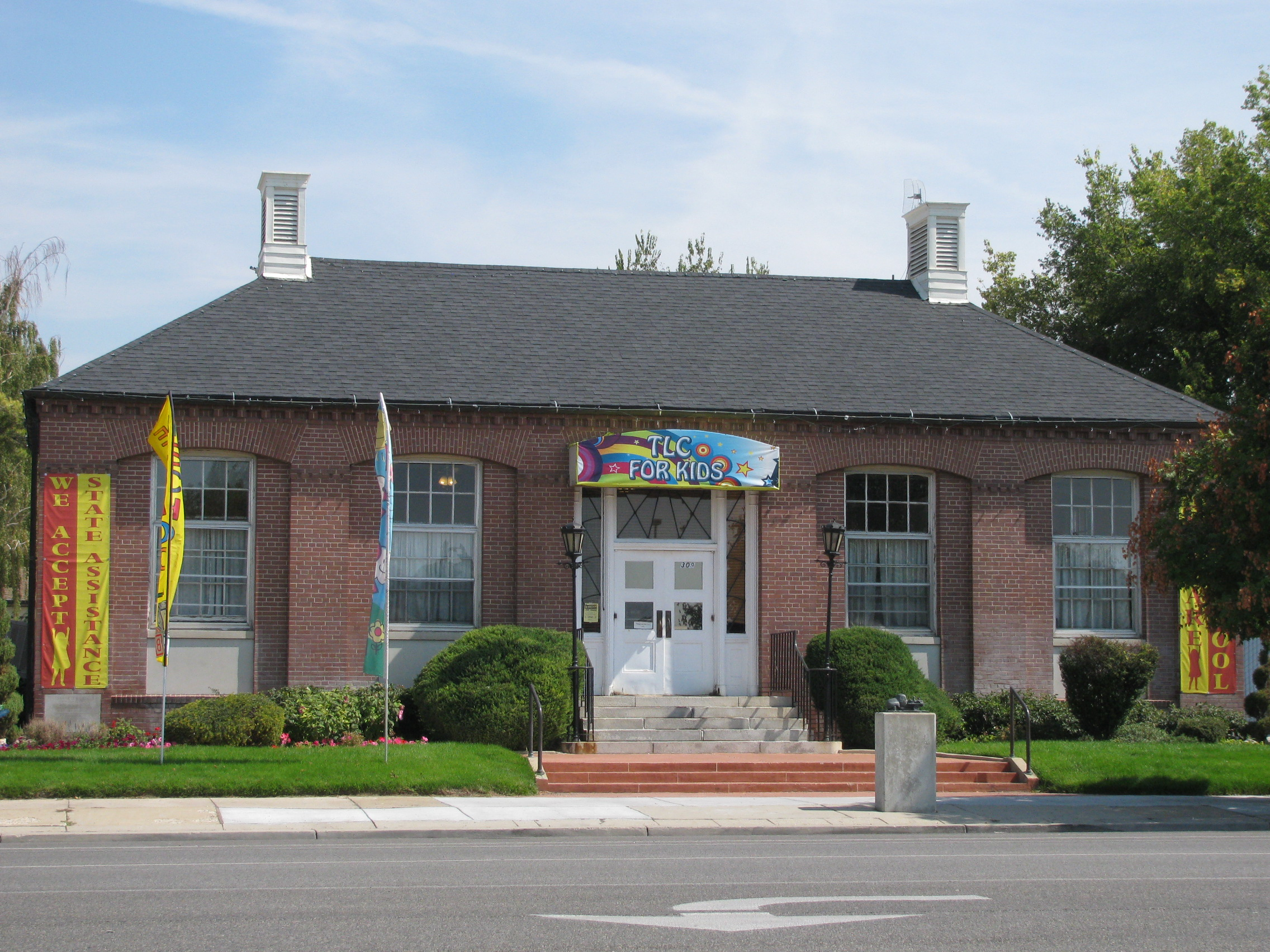

- Location within Utah Location within the United States
- Location: 309 South Main Street, Springville, Utah; United States
- Coordinates: 40°9′44″N 111°36′35″W
- Area: 0.3 acres (0.12 ha)
- Built: 1941
- Architect: Simon, Louis A.
- Architectural style: Colonial Revival
- MPS: US Post Offices in Utah MPS
- NRHP reference No.: 89002000
- Added to NRHP: November 27, 1989

The U.S. Post Office-Springville Main at 309 South Main Street in Springville, Utah, United States was built in 1941. It was built in Colonial Revival style and credited to supervising architect Louis A. Simon. It has also been known as Springville Main Post Office. It was listed on the National Register of Historic Places in 1989.

== See also ==
- National Register of Historic Places listings in Utah County, Utah
