= Deseret Telegraph and Post Office =

- U.S. National Register of Historic Places
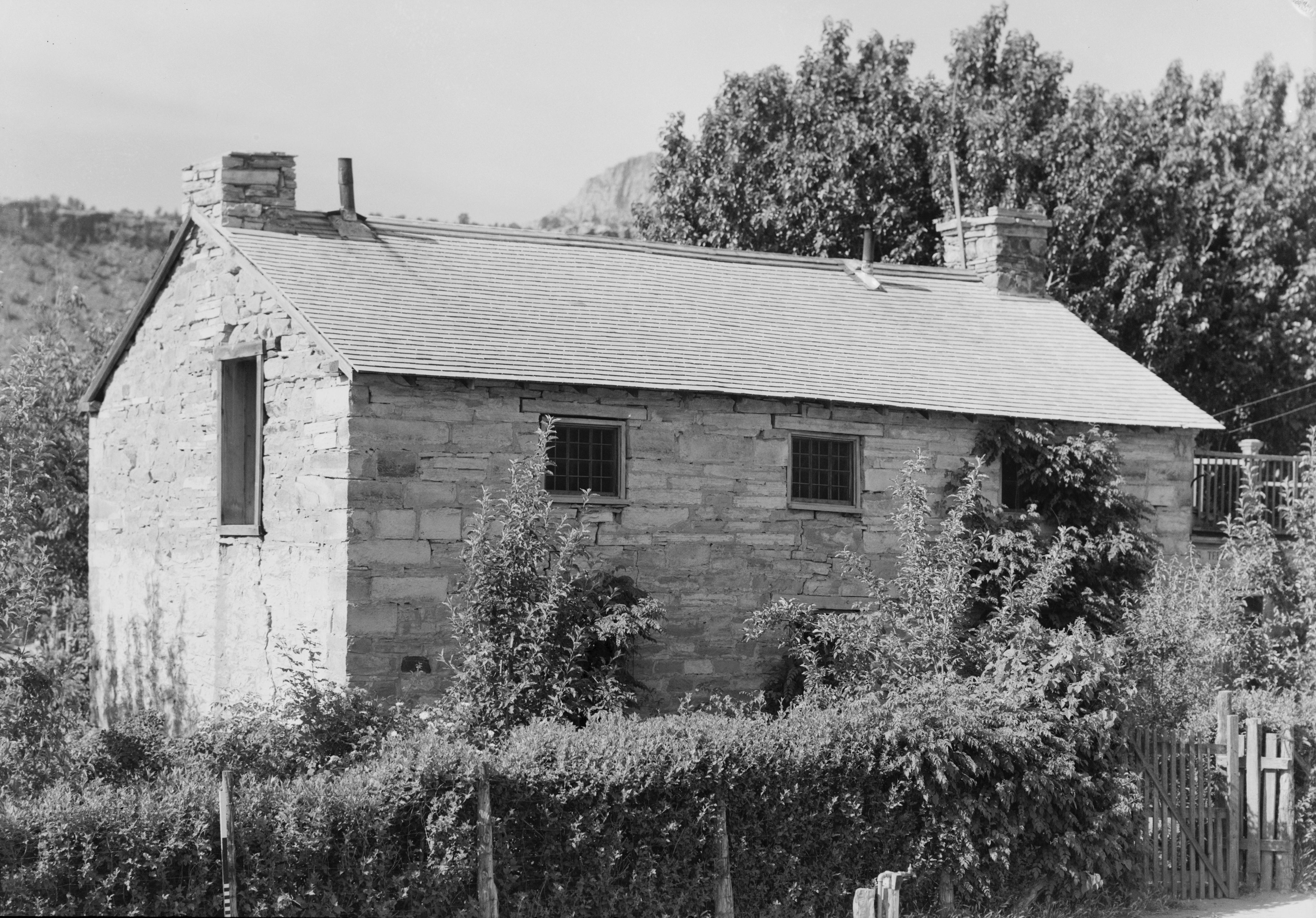
- Deseret Telegraph and Post Office in 1940

- Location within Utah Location within the United States
- Location: West Main Street (SR-9); Rockville, Utah; United States
- Coordinates: 37°9′39″N 113°2′40″W
- Area: 0.1 acres (0.040 ha)
- Built: 1864
- Built by: Huber, Edward
- NRHP reference No.: 72001263
- Added to NRHP: February 23, 1972

The Deseret Telegraph and Post Office building is one of the oldest buildings in Rockville, Utah, United States. It was built in 1864 by Edward Huber. A small wood frame office addition housed a telegraph office and a post office. The main structure is a two-story red sandstone building with a low second floor. The office is a lean-to addition on the right side of the main building. A similar lean-to on the other side, now missing, matched the office, and there is a two-story gabled frame addition to the rear. There are two rooms in the main block downstairs, and one upstairs.

The Deseret Telegraph and Post Office was placed on the National Register of Historic Places on February 23, 1972. The house has been restored.

== See also ==
- Deseret Telegraph Company
