= Silver City Historic District =

Silver City Historic District may refer to:

- Silver City Historic District (Idaho), listed on the National Register of Historic Places in Idaho
- Silver City Historic District (New Mexico), listed on the National Register of Historic Places in New Mexico
