= Tintic Standard Reduction Mill =

- U.S. National Register of Historic Places
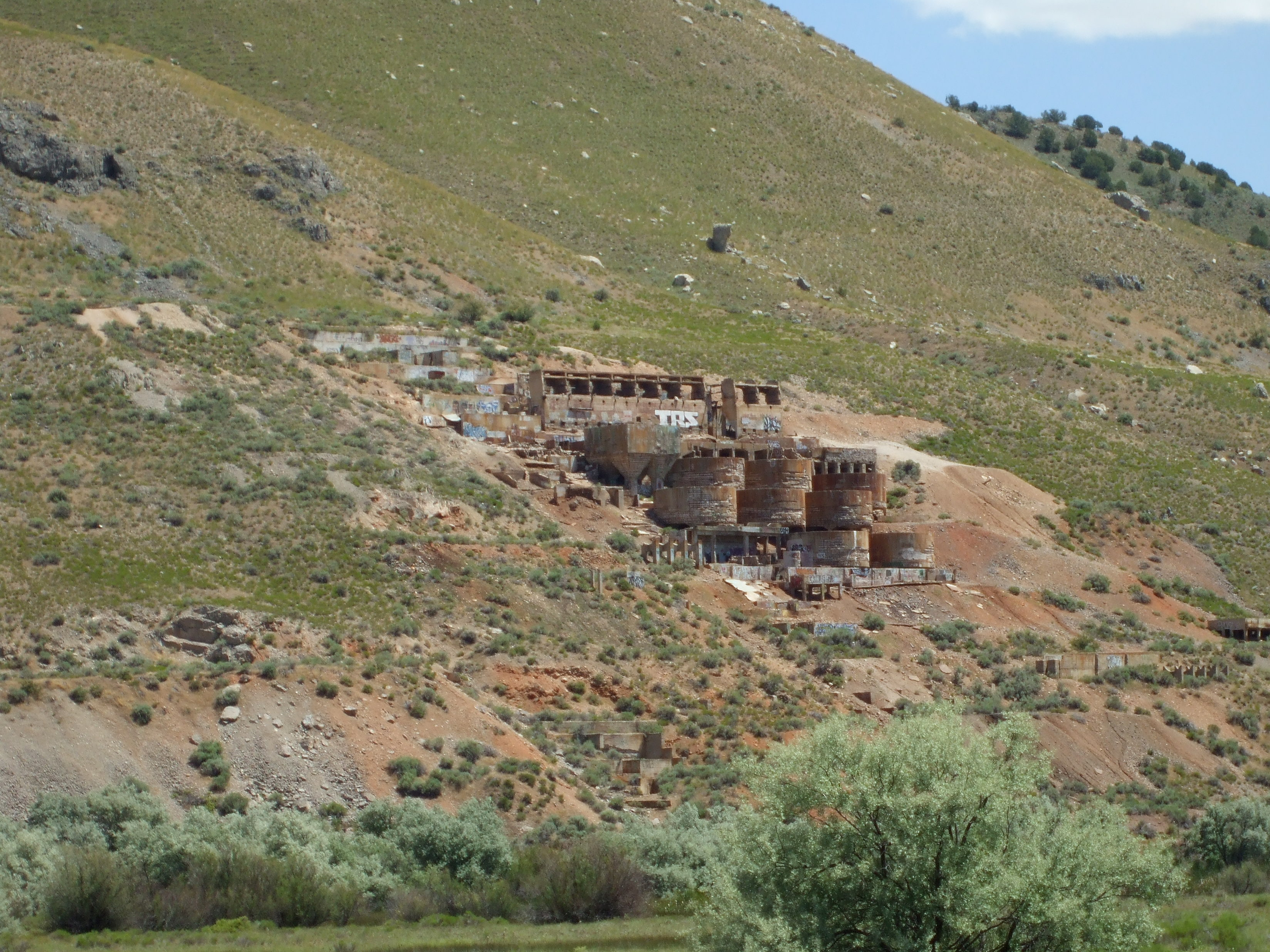
- Tintic Standard Reduction Mill, June 2009

- Location within Utah Location within the United States
- Nearest city: Genola, Utah; United States
- Coordinates: 39.95748°N 111.85500°W
- Area: 0.1 acres (0.040 ha)
- Built: 1916
- Built by: Madge, W.C.
- NRHP reference No.: 78002700
- Added to NRHP: September 13, 1978

The Tintic Standard Reduction Mill—also known as the Tintic Mill or Harold Mill—built in 1920, and only operating from 1921 to 1925, is an abandoned refinery or concentrator located on the west slope of Warm Springs Mountain on the southern edge of Genola, Utah, United States. In 2002, the Utah Department of Environmental Quality tested the soil and found it contained high levels of arsenic and lead, which can lead to serious health problems and even death.

== Description ==
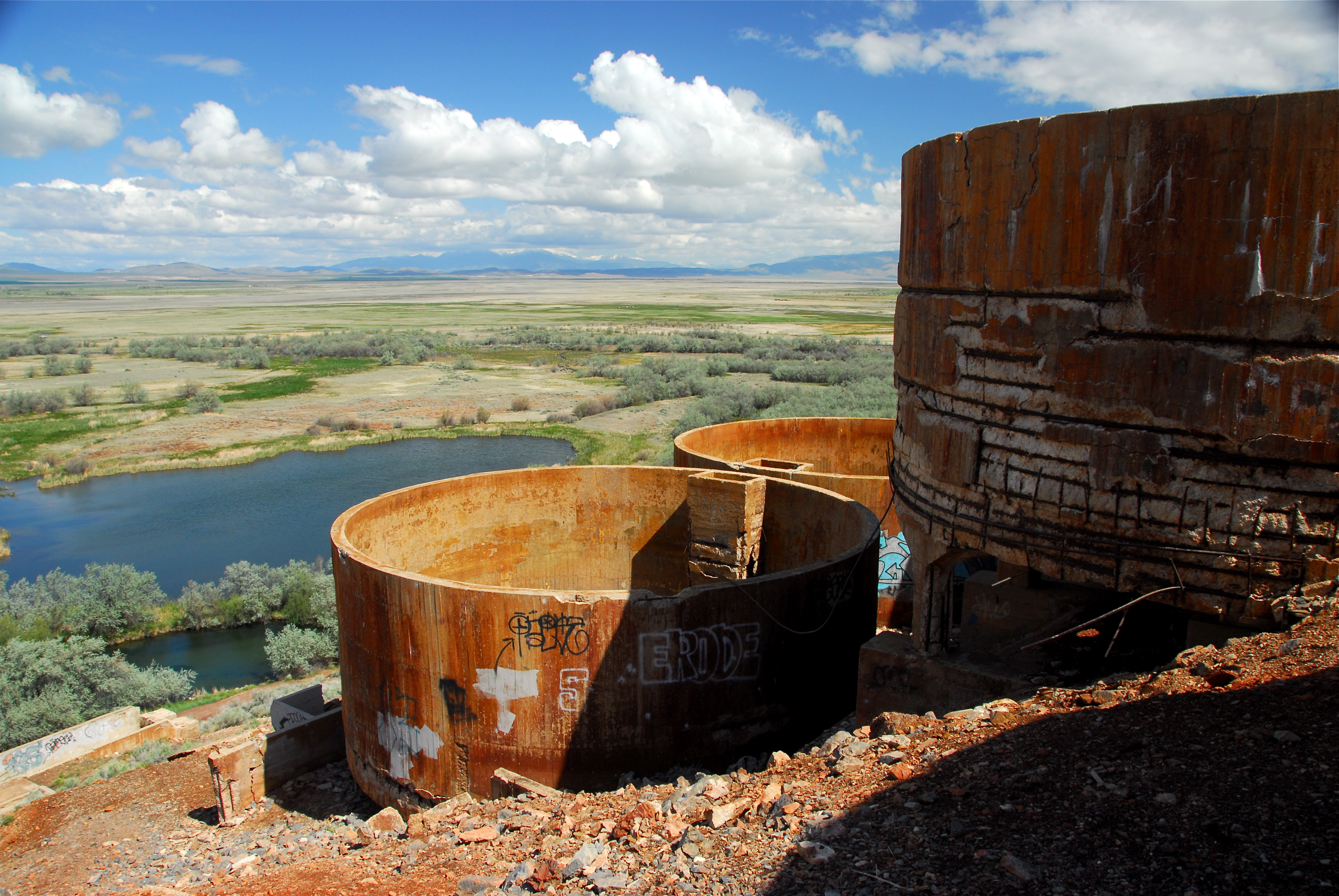
Looking down on the Warm Springs in Genola, May 2008

The mill was designed and built by W. C. Madge. It is significant as the only American mill using the Augustin process during the early 1920s. Metals processed at the mill included copper, gold, silver, and lead, all of which were received from another mill near Eureka. The metal content of ore was increased through the process to make transportation less expensive. The reducing process used was an acid-brine chloridizing and leaching process which became outdated, leading to the abandonment of the site in 1925. At the mill's highest productivity it processed 200 tons of ore daily from the Tintic Mining District.

What remains of the mill are foundations for water tanks, crushers, roasters, iron boxes, leaching tanks, and drain boxes. The site dominates the surrounding landscape with its size and unique colors and shapes. It has been speculated that the mill may be the contributor of heavy metal pollution in the Warm Springs which lie below it.

It was listed on the National Register of Historic Places September 13, 1978.

== See also ==
- Tintic Smelter Site, site of a different "Tintic Mill", near Eureka in Juab County, Utah
- National Register of Historic Places listings in Utah County, Utah
