= Echo Post Office =

- U.S. National Register of Historic Places
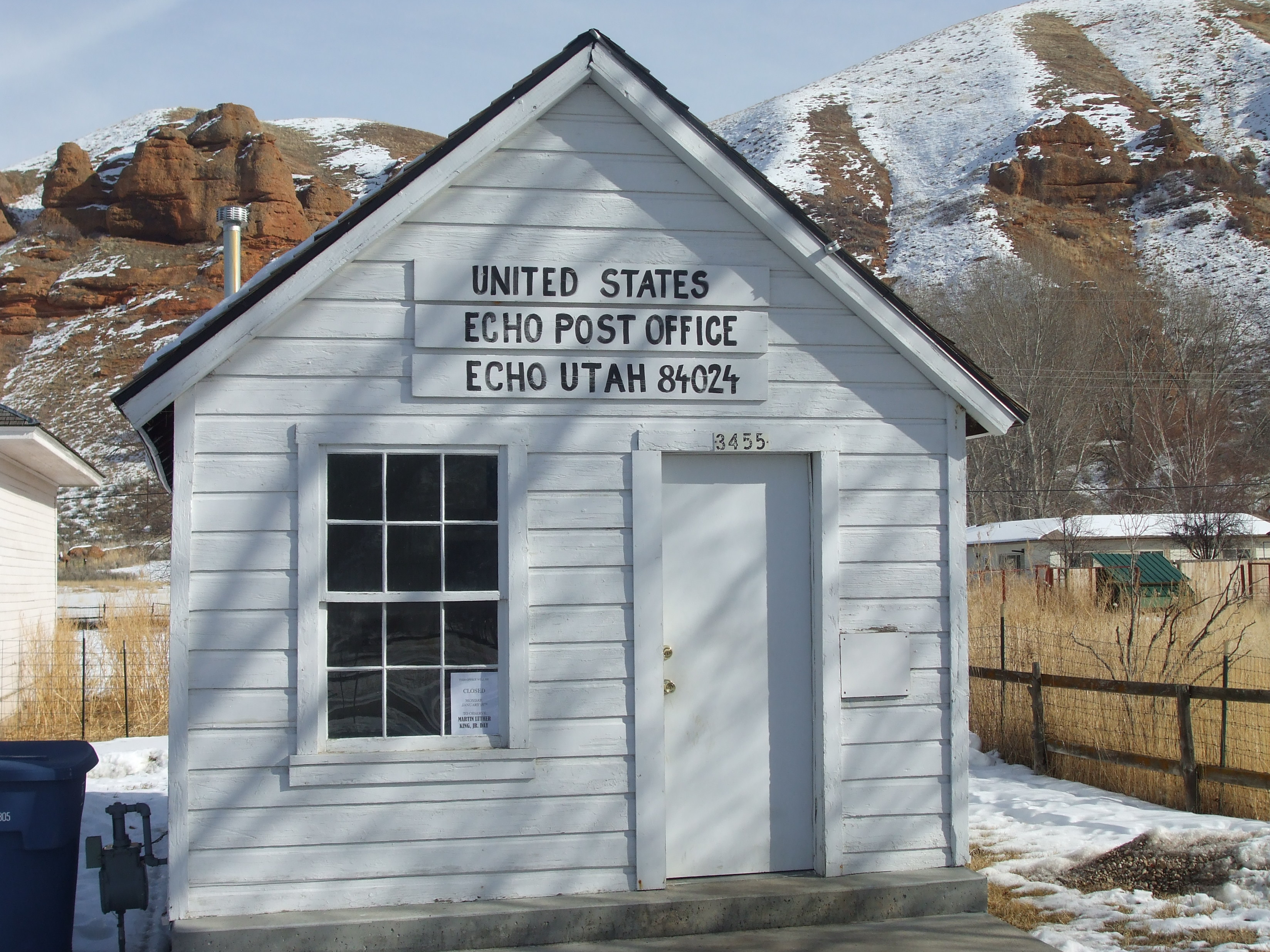

- Location within Utah Location within the United States
- Location: 3455 S. Echo rd., Echo, Utah
- Coordinates: 40°58′49″N 111°26′37″W
- Area: 1.1 acres (0.45 ha)
- Built: perhaps 1928
- Architectural style: Late Victorian
- NRHP reference No.: 03000159
- Added to NRHP: August 14, 2003

The Echo Post Office, at 3455 S. Echo Rd. in Echo, Utah was listed on the National Register of Historic Places in 2003.

It is a small post office building, built perhaps in 1928 or perhaps as early as 1900.

It was moved about 50 feet (15 m) in early 2003.
