= Nephi Main Post Office =

- US Post Office-Nephi Main
- U.S. National Register of Historic Places
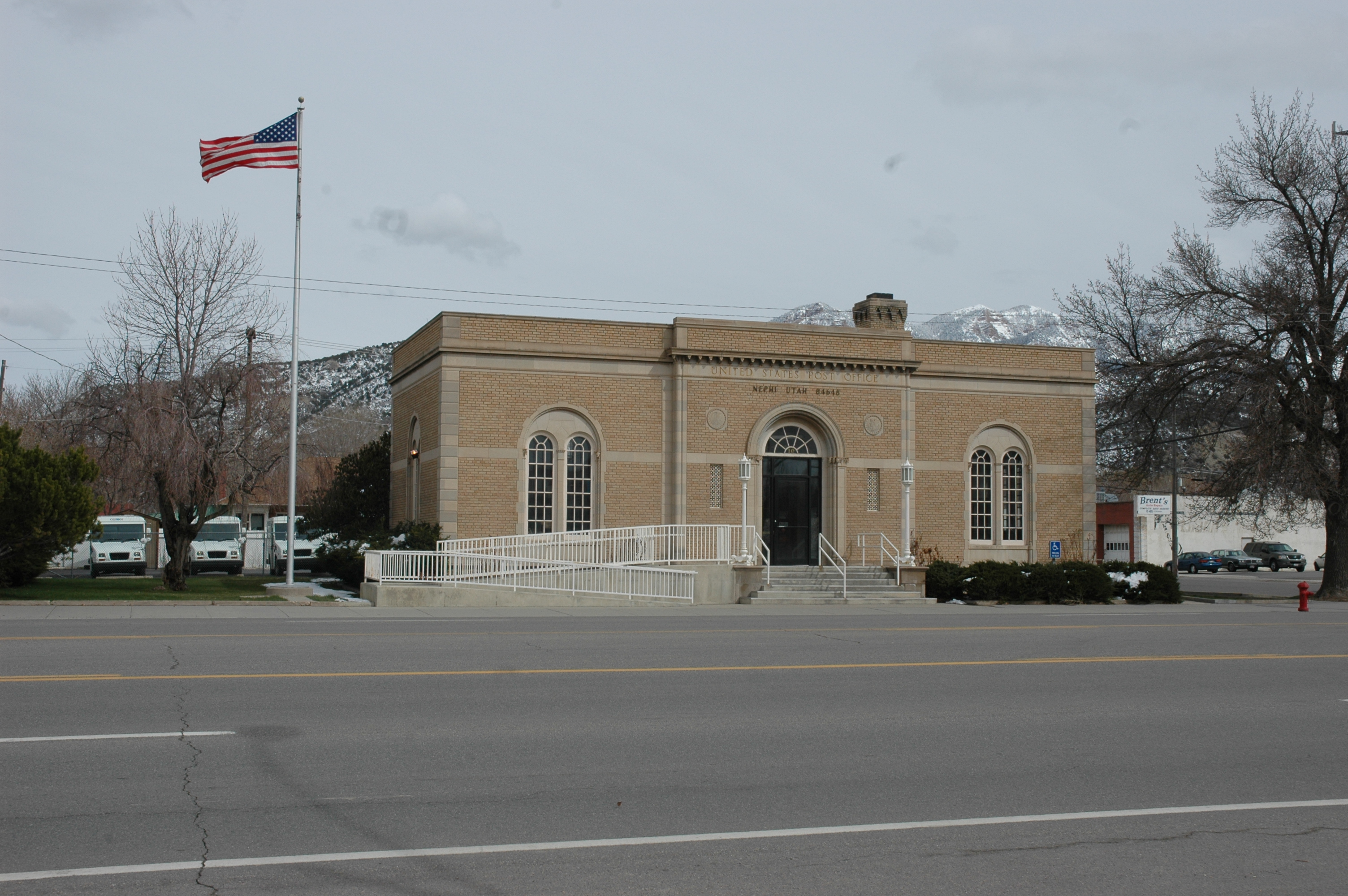

- Location within Utah Location within the United States
- Location: 10 N. Main, Nephi, Utah
- Coordinates: 39°42′32″N 111°50′06″W
- Area: 0.4 acres (0.16 ha)
- Built: 1933
- Architect: James A. Wetmore
- Architectural style: Late 19th and 20th Century Revivals, Italian Renaissance
- MPS: US Post Offices in Utah MPS
- NRHP reference No.: 89001996
- Added to NRHP: November 27, 1989

The Nephi Main Post Office, at 10 N. Main in Nephi, Utah, was built in 1933. It was listed on the National Register of Historic Places as US Post Office-Nephi Main in 1989.

Its design is credited to James A. Wetmore, then the acting U.S. Supervising Architect.
