= Juab County, Utah =

County in Utah, United States

- County
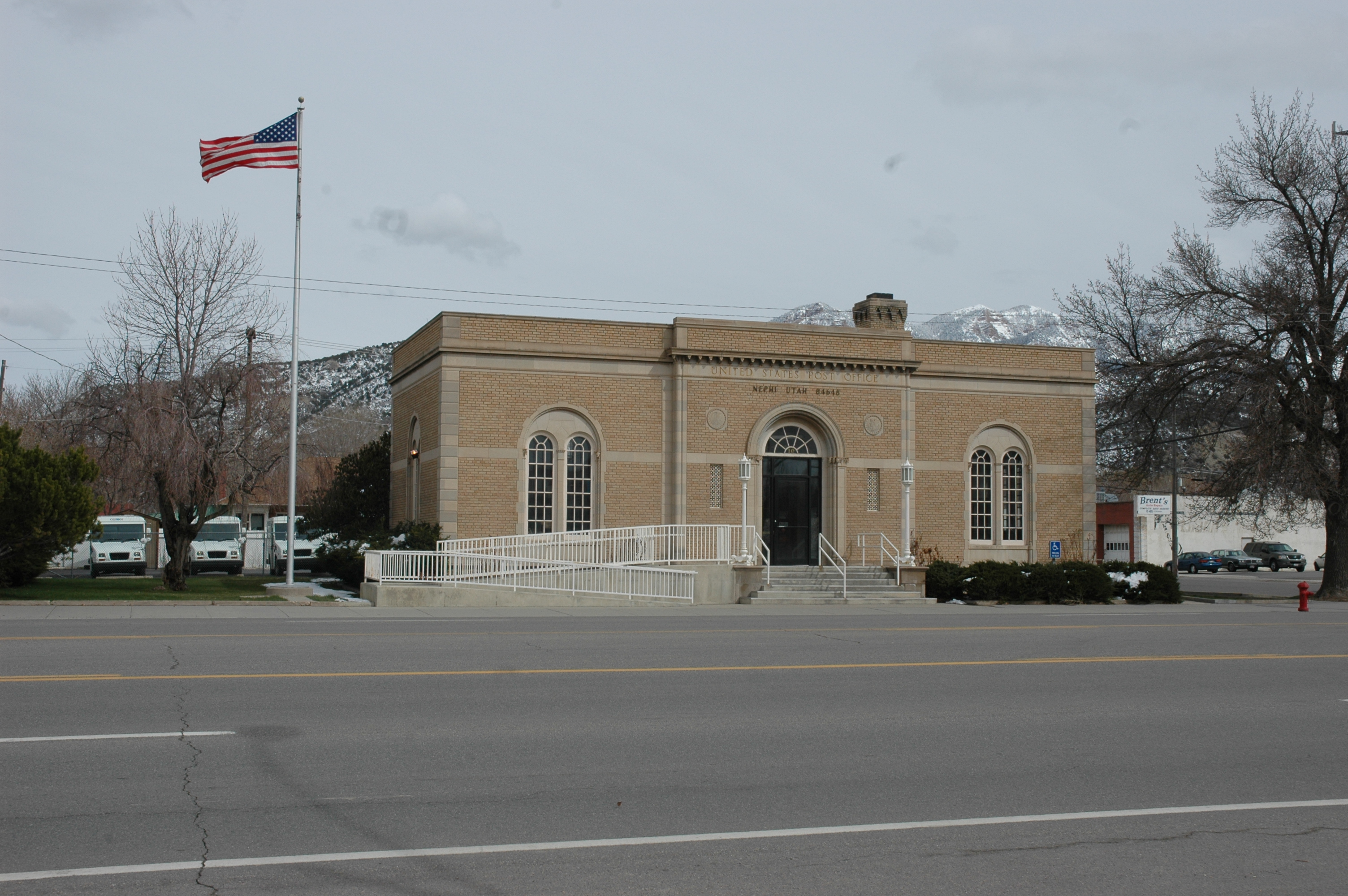
- Nephi Post Office (2010)

- Location within the U.S. state of Utah
- Coordinates: 39.71°N 112.80°W
- Country: United States
- State: Utah
- Founded: March 3, 1852
- Named for: Ute word for valley
- Seat: Nephi
- Largest city: Nephi

Area
  - Total: 3,406 sq mi (8,820 km^{2})
  - Land: 3,392 sq mi (8,790 km^{2})
  - Water: 14 sq mi (36 km^{2}) 0.4%

Population (2020)
  - Total: 11,786
  - Estimate (2025): 13,567 ▲
  - Density: 3.475/sq mi (1.342/km^{2})
- Time zone: UTC−7 (Mountain)
  - Summer (DST): UTC−6 (MDT)
- Congressional district: 2nd
- Website: https://juabcounty.gov/

Juab County (/ˈdʒuːæb/ JOO-ab) is a county in western Utah, United States. As of the 2020 United States census, the population was 11,786. Its county seat and largest city is Nephi. Juab County is part of the Provo–Orem, Utah Metropolitan Statistical Area, which is also included in the Salt Lake City–Provo–Orem, Utah Combined Statistical Area. The county was created by the Utah Territory legislature in 1852. Its west border abuts the state of Nevada, and its highest point is Mount Ibapah. The county name reportedly derives from a Native American word meaning thirsty valley, or possibly only valley.

== History ==
The area of future Juab County was inhabited by nomadic indigenous peoples before the Mormon settlement of Utah beginning in 1847. Soon after, Mormons and others traveling through the area had established a road to California, leading SSW from Great Salt Lake City. It passed Salt Creek, flowing westward through a slough in the Wasatch Mountains. The area around this creek was often used as a stopping or camping spot by travelers and by 1851 Mormon settlers had begun a settlement in the area. When the Utah Territory legislature created a county (by partitioning territory from Utah County) to oversee the growth and organization of the largely uninhabited and unbearable area, this settlement (called Salt Creek) was the only real settlement worthy of the name, and it was designated as the county seat in a March 3, 1852, legislative act. The new county's description included considerable territory falling in present-day Nevada. The county name reportedly derived from a Native American word meaning thirsty valley, or possibly only valley.

The county's boundaries were altered in 1854, 1855, and 1856. Also, in 1856 the Territory legislature, acknowledging the upcoming establishment of Nevada Territory, removed from the boundary description of Juab county all territories west of 114 degrees longitude. Further boundary adjustments were made in 1861, 1862, 1866, 1870, in 1888, and 1913. A small adjustment between Juab and Sanpete counties on March 8, 1919, created the current Juab County configuration.

Early settlers in Salt Creek devoted themselves to agriculture and livestock. However, by 1869 mining of precious metals had begun in the Tintic region. Mining towns, including Diamond, Silver City, and Eureka, appeared. By 1889 it was considered one of the nation's most productive mining areas. Mining continued as the dominant economic driver through the mid-twentieth century, then subsided. Salt Creek grew apace, although in 1882 the town name (and US Post Office designation) was changed to "Nephi".

== Politics and government ==
Juab has traditionally voted Republican. In only one national election since 1948 the county selected the Democratic Party candidate.

State elected offices
Position	District	Name	Affiliation	First elected
Senate	24	Derrin Owens	Republican	2020
House of Representatives	58	Steven J. Lund	Republican	2020
House of Representatives	68	Merrill Nelson	Republican	2012
Board of Education	3	Matt Hymas	Republican	2020

United States presidential election results for Juab County, Utah
Year	Republican		Democratic		Third party(ies)	
Year	No.	%	No.	%	No.	%
1896	439	15.68%	2,360	84.32%	0	0.00%
1900	1,532	42.46%	1,986	55.04%	90	2.49%
1904	1,493	48.32%	1,206	39.03%	391	12.65%
1908	1,615	48.40%	1,421	42.58%	301	9.02%
1912	1,171	35.38%	985	29.76%	1,154	34.86%
1916	1,248	34.45%	2,221	61.30%	154	4.25%
1920	1,692	53.12%	1,308	41.07%	185	5.81%
1924	1,325	43.57%	1,241	40.81%	475	15.62%
1928	1,557	47.48%	1,714	52.27%	8	0.24%
1932	1,220	37.60%	1,969	60.68%	56	1.73%
1936	1,027	30.41%	2,319	68.67%	31	0.92%
1940	1,412	39.74%	2,136	60.12%	5	0.14%
1944	1,192	44.48%	1,483	55.34%	5	0.19%
1948	1,396	47.94%	1,501	51.55%	15	0.52%
1952	1,711	58.72%	1,203	41.28%	0	0.00%
1956	1,512	59.60%	1,025	40.40%	0	0.00%
1960	1,203	50.95%	1,158	49.05%	0	0.00%
1964	926	41.25%	1,319	58.75%	0	0.00%
1968	1,201	53.95%	907	40.75%	118	5.30%
1972	1,629	67.06%	691	28.45%	109	4.49%
1976	1,290	51.58%	1,091	43.62%	120	4.80%
1980	1,872	69.31%	720	26.66%	109	4.04%
1984	1,902	67.23%	917	32.41%	10	0.35%
1988	1,505	59.65%	974	38.60%	44	1.74%
1992	1,237	42.73%	823	28.43%	835	28.84%
1996	1,290	49.12%	928	35.34%	408	15.54%
2000	2,023	72.64%	619	22.23%	143	5.13%
2004	2,681	78.46%	605	17.71%	131	3.83%
2008	2,683	73.19%	741	20.21%	242	6.60%
2012	3,448	85.99%	451	11.25%	111	2.77%
2016	2,827	66.97%	442	10.47%	952	22.55%
2020	5,087	86.72%	645	11.00%	134	2.28%
2024	5,671	87.01%	734	11.26%	113	1.73%

== Geography ==
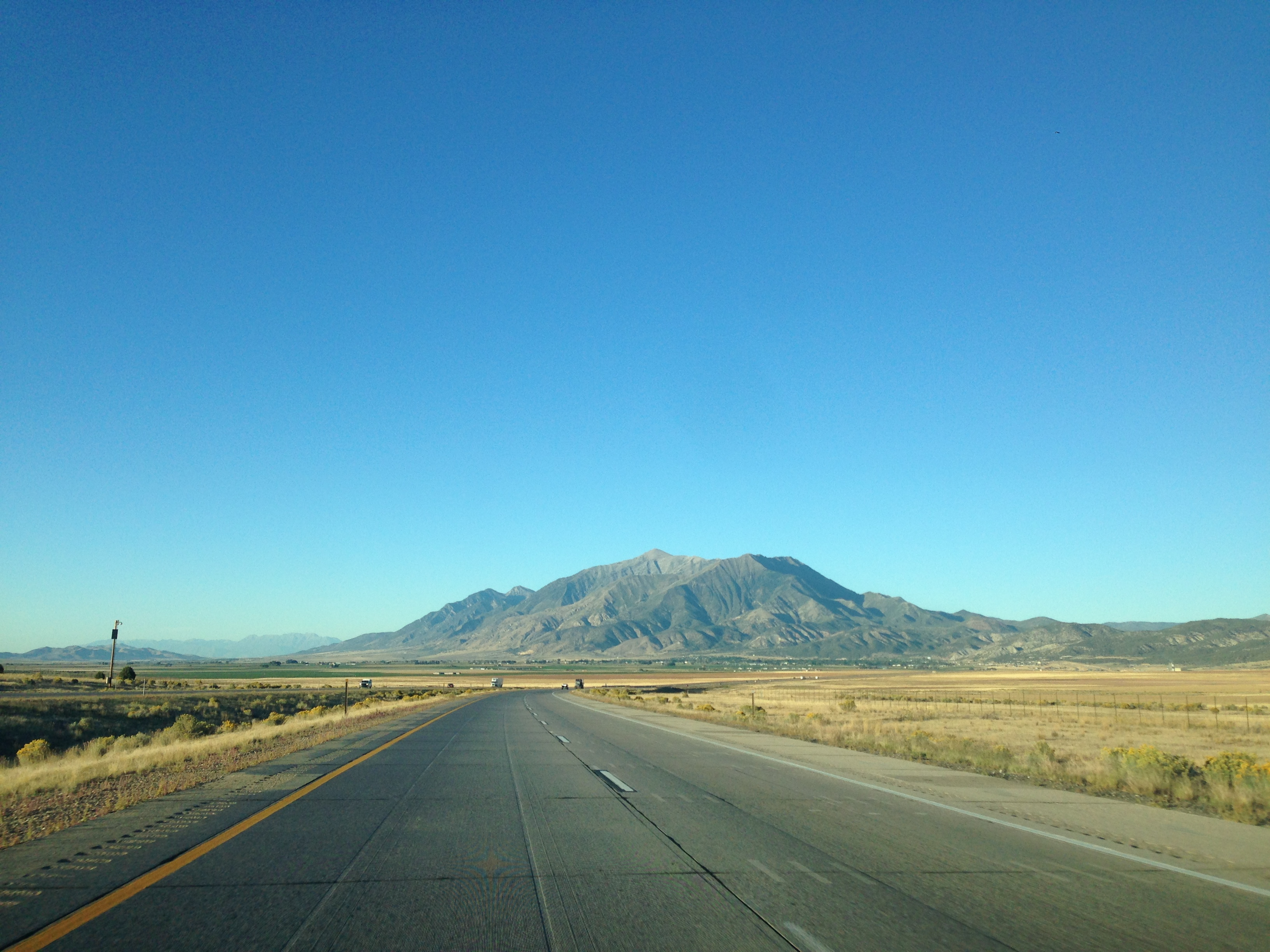
View north along Interstate 15 in the Juab Valley, near milepost 219, September 2013

Juab County lies on the west side of Utah. Its west border abuts the east border of the state of Nevada. Its planar areas consist of rugged, arid semi-arable fine-grain soil, with hills and low mountains. Its eastern border is loosely defined by the ridgeline of an arm of the Wasatch Mountains. Pleasant Valley Draw exits in Juab County. The terrain generally slopes to the north, with its highest point on Mount Ibapah, a crest of the East Central Great Basin Range in northwest Juab County. The listed elevation of Mt. Ibapah is 12,087 ft (3,684 m) ASL. The county has a total area of 3,406 square miles (8,820 km^{2}), of which 3,392 square miles (8,790 km^{2}) is land and 14 square miles (36 km^{2}) (0.4%) is water. The county's shape bears resemblance to the shape of Massachusetts.

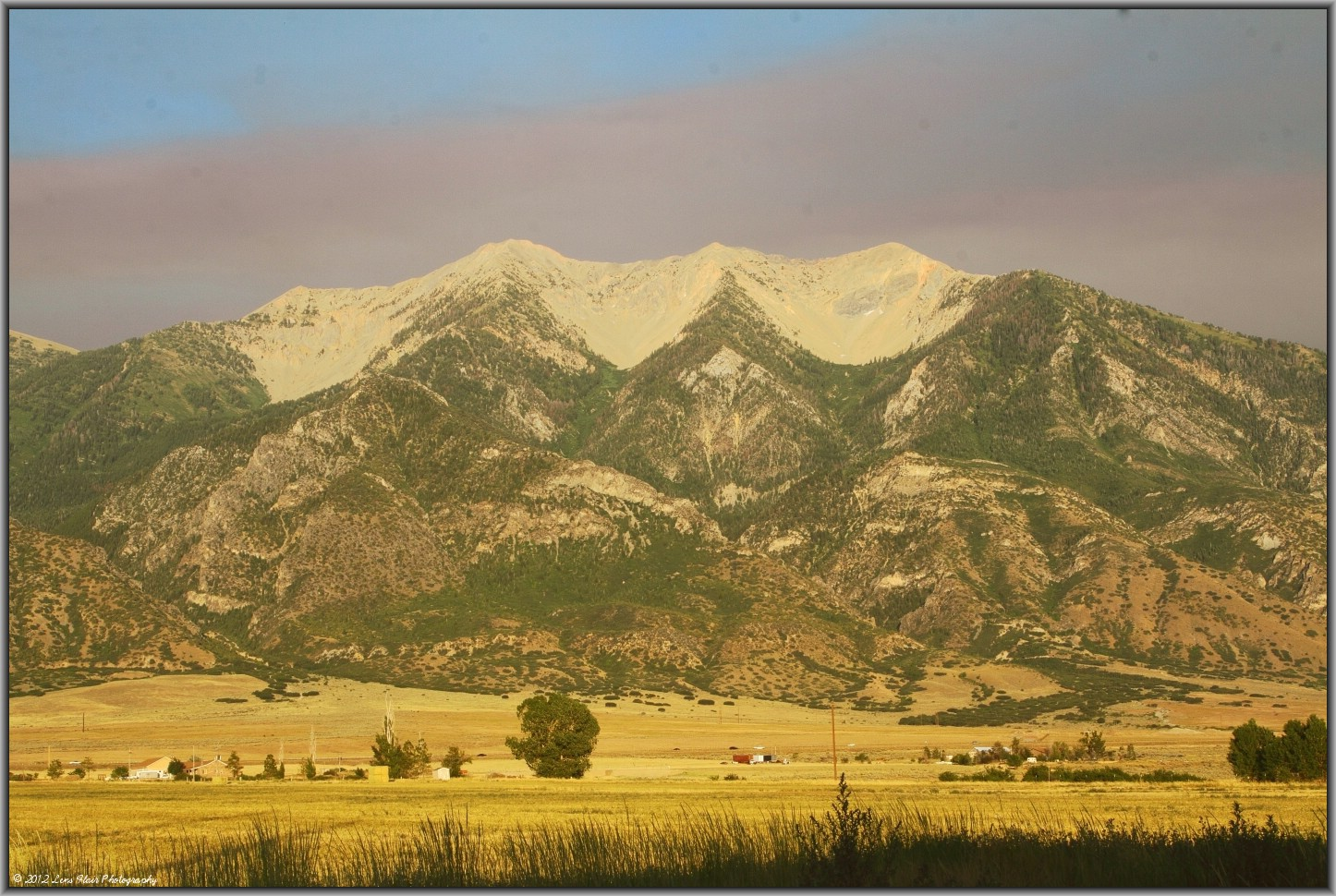
Looking east across the Juab Valley and Mount Nebo, June 2012

=== Airports ===
- Nephi Municipal Airport (NPH)

=== Highways ===
- Interstate 15
- U.S. Route 6
- Utah State Route 28
- Utah State Route 36
- Utah State Route 78
- Utah State Route 132

=== Adjacent counties ===
- Tooele County - north
- Utah County - northeast
- Sanpete County - southeast
- Millard County - south
- White Pine County, Nevada - west

=== Protected areas ===
- Deep Creek Wildlife Management Area
- Fish Springs National Wildlife Refuge
- Fishlake National Forest (part)
- Mona Front Wildlife Management Area
- Triangle Ranch Wildlife Management Area
- Uinta-Wasatch-Cache National Forest (part)
- Yuba State Park (part)
  - Yuba Lake State Recreation Area

=== Lakes ===
- Andys Pond
- Antelope Springs
- Baker Hot Springs
- Big Spring
- Bittner Knoll Reservoir
- Blue Springs
- Brough Reservoir
- Burraston Ponds
- Cane Springs
- CCC Reservoir
- Cherry Creek Reservoir
- Chicken Creek Reservoir
- Coyote Knoll Reservoir
- Crater Bench Reservoir
- Dead Horse Tank
- Desert Mountain Reservoir
- Dog Valley Reservoir
- East Dugway Reservoir
- East Topaz Reservoir
- East Topaz 2 Reservoir
- Fish Springs
  - Avocet Pool
  - Crater Spring
  - Curlew Pool
  - Deadman Spring
  - Egret Pool
  - Gadwall Pool
  - Harrison Pool
  - House Springs
  - Ibis Pool
  - Lost Spring
  - Mallard Pool
  - Middle Spring
  - Mirror Spring
  - North Springs
  - Percy Spring
  - Pintail Pool
  - Shoveler Pool
  - South Springs
  - Thomas Springs
  - Walter Spring
- Hogback Reservoir
- Hole in Rock Reservoir
- Hole-in-the-Wall Reservoir
- Irons Reservoir
- Laird Spring
- Lime Spring
- Little Red Cedar Spring
- Lower Topaz Reservoir
- Mile Pond
- Molten Spring
- Mona Reservoir
- Monument Reservoir
- Mud Lake Reservoir
- Mud Springs
- North Sugarville Reservoir
- Picture Rock Reservoir
- Picture Rock Wash Reservoir
- Rain Lake
- River Bed Reservoir
- River Bed Reservoir Number 2
- Roadside Reservoir (near Boyd Station)
- Roadside Reservoir (in the Tule Valley)
- South Desert Mountain Reservoir
- Studhorse Springs
- Swasey Point Reservoir
- Table Knoll Reservoir
- Trough Spring
- West Fork Reservoir
- Yuba Lake (or Sevier Bridge Reservoir)(partially)

== Demographics ==
Historical population
Census	Pop.	Note	%±
1860	672		—
1870	2,034		202.7%
1880	3,474		70.8%
1890	5,582		60.7%
1900	10,082		80.6%
1910	10,702		6.1%
1920	9,871		−7.8%
1930	8,605		−12.8%
1940	7,392		−14.1%
1950	5,981		−19.1%
1960	4,597		−23.1%
1970	4,574		−0.5%
1980	5,530		20.9%
1990	5,817		5.2%
2000	8,238		41.6%
2010	10,246		24.4%
2020	11,786		15.0%
2025 (est.)	13,567	▲	15.1%
US Decennial Census; 1790–1960 1900–1990; 1990–2000 2010 2020

=== 2020 Census ===
According to the 2020 United States census and 2020 American Community Survey, there were 11,786 people in Juab County with a population density of 3.5 people per square mile (1.3/km^{2}). Among non-Hispanic or Latino people, the racial makeup was 10,781 (91.5%) White, 11 (0.1%) African American, 89 (0.8%) Native American, 32 (0.3%) Asian, 41 (0.3%) Pacific Islander, 10 (0.1%) from other races, and 248 (2.1%) from two or more races. 574 (4.9%) people were Hispanic or Latino.

Juab County, Utah – Racial and ethnic composition Note: the US Census treats Hispanic/Latino as an ethnic category. This table excludes Latinos from the racial categories and assigns them to a separate category. Hispanics/Latinos may be of any race.
Race / Ethnicity (NH = Non-Hispanic)	Pop 2000	Pop 2010	Pop 2020	% 2000	% 2010	% 2020
White alone (NH)	7,844	9,631	10,781	95.22%	94.00%	91.47%
Black or African American alone (NH)	9	21	11	0.11%	0.20%	0.09%
Native American or Alaska Native alone (NH)	80	75	89	0.97%	0.73%	0.76%
Asian alone (NH)	27	22	32	0.33%	0.21%	0.27%
Pacific Islander alone (NH)	3	15	41	0.04%	0.15%	0.35%
Other race alone (NH)	6	5	10	0.07%	0.05%	0.08%
Mixed race or Multiracial (NH)	52	98	248	0.63%	0.96%	2.10%
Hispanic or Latino (any race)	217	379	574	2.63%	3.70%	4.87%
Total	8,238	10,246	11,786	100.00%	100.00%	100.00%

There were 6,068 (51.48%) males and 5,718 (48.52%) females, and the population distribution by age was 4,030 (34.2%) under the age of 18, 6,203 (52.6%) from 18 to 64, and 1,553 (13.2%) who were at least 65 years old. The median age was 30.7 years.

There were 3,529 households in Juab County with an average size of 3.34 of which 2,857 (81.0%) were families and 672 (19.0%) were non-families. Among all families, 2,387 (67.6%) were married couples, 176 (5.0%) were male householders with no spouse, and 294 (8.3%) were female householders with no spouse. Among all non-families, 584 (16.5%) were a single person living alone and 88 (2.5%) were two or more people living together. 1,583 (44.9%) of all households had children under the age of 18. 2,862 (81.1%) of households were owner-occupied while 667 (18.9%) were renter-occupied.

The median income for a Juab County household was $68,333 and the median family income was $76,736, with a per-capita income of $23,467. The median income for males that were full-time employees was $55,954 and for females $39,457. 11.7% of the population and 9.9% of families were below the poverty line.

In terms of education attainment, out of the 6,540 people in Juab County 25 years or older, 494 (7.6%) had not completed high school, 2,475 (37.8%) had a high school diploma or equivalency, 2,347 (35.9%) had some college or associate degree, 762 (11.7%) had a bachelor's degree, and 462 (7.1%) had a graduate or professional degree.

== Education ==
Two school districts serve the county:

- Juab School District, serving the Juab Valley area on the eastern end of the county
- Tintic School District, serving the remaining western part of the county

== Communities ==
Map of Juab County communities

=== Cities ===
- Eureka
- Mona
- Nephi (county seat)
- Santaquin (part)

=== Towns ===
- Levan
- Rocky Ridge

=== Unincorporated communities ===
- Callao
- Goshute
- Ironton
- Juab
- Mammoth
- Mills
- Partoun
- Red Point
- Sharp
- Starr
- Tintic Junction
- Trout Creek

=== Ghost towns ===
- Chicken Creek
- Diamond
- Jericho
- Joy
- Knightsville
- Silver City

== See also ==
- List of counties in Utah
- National Register of Historic Places listings in Juab County, Utah
