= East Tintic Mountains =

Mountain range in Utah, USA

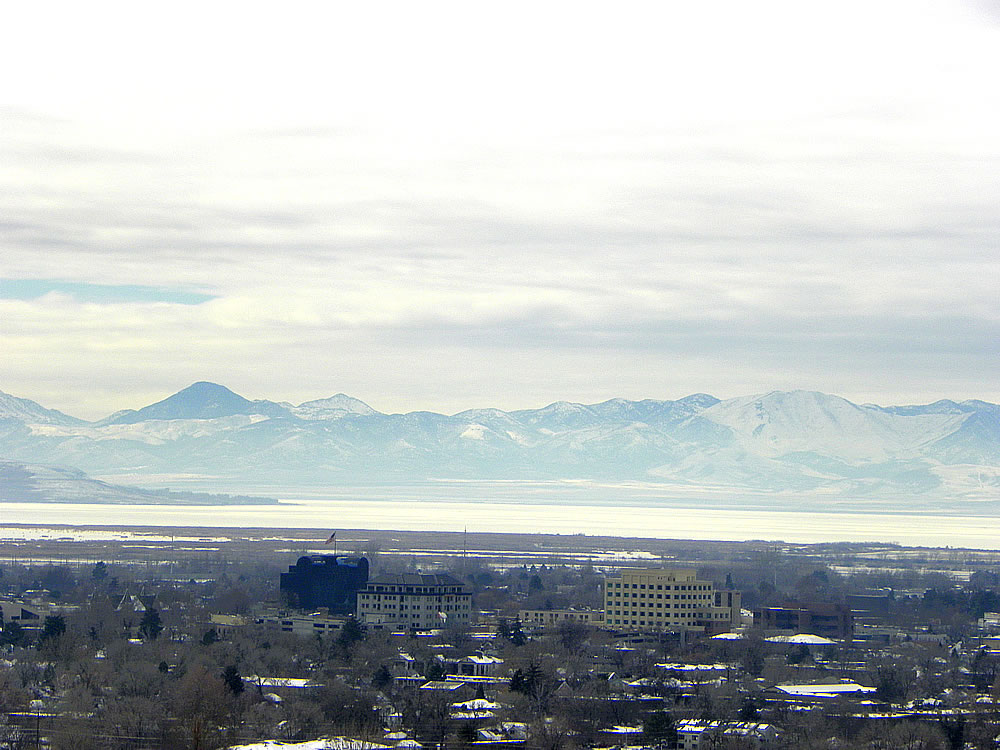
- NE flank of range & Utah Lake from Provo "County Line Ridge" and peaks (overlooking Utah Valley, & Goshen Valley, West Mountain (Utah County, Utah) at photo left)

Highest point
- Peak: Boulter Peak
- Elevation: 8,308 ft (2,532 m)
- Coordinates: 40°00′13″N 112°11′50″W

Geography
- Location within Utah
- Country: United States
- State: Utah
- Counties: Utah, Juab and Tooele
- Settlement: Eureka, Utah
- Borders on: Utah Valley, Goshen Valley, Rush Valley and Cedar Valley
- Topo map(s): USGS Boulter Peak, Allens Ranch, Tintic Junction, Eureka, Tintic Mountain and Furner Ridge 7.5 minute maps

Geology
- Mountain type: Mountain Range

The East Tintic Mountains are a mountain range in central Juab, Utah, and Tooele counties in Utah, United States on the east margin of the Great Basin just west of the Wasatch Front about 50 miles (80 km) south-southeast of Salt Lake City. The community of Eureka is an old mining town near the center of the range. U.S. Route 6 Passes through the central part of the range and through Eureka.

The Tintic Mining District is located in the central part of the range. The district was an important producer of silver, gold and base metals during the late 19th and early 20th centuries. The mountain range, Tintic Valley, and the mining district are named after Chief Tintic of the Goshute.

The Tintic Smelter Site, the Sunbeam Mine, and the Silver City Cemetery, listed on the National Register of Historic Places, preserve some remnants of the district.

The Tintic quartzite is named after the Tintic Mountains, where exposures of the formation occur.

== See also ==
- List of mountains in Utah
- Silver City, Utah
