= Eureka, Utah =

City in Juab County, Utah, United States

- City
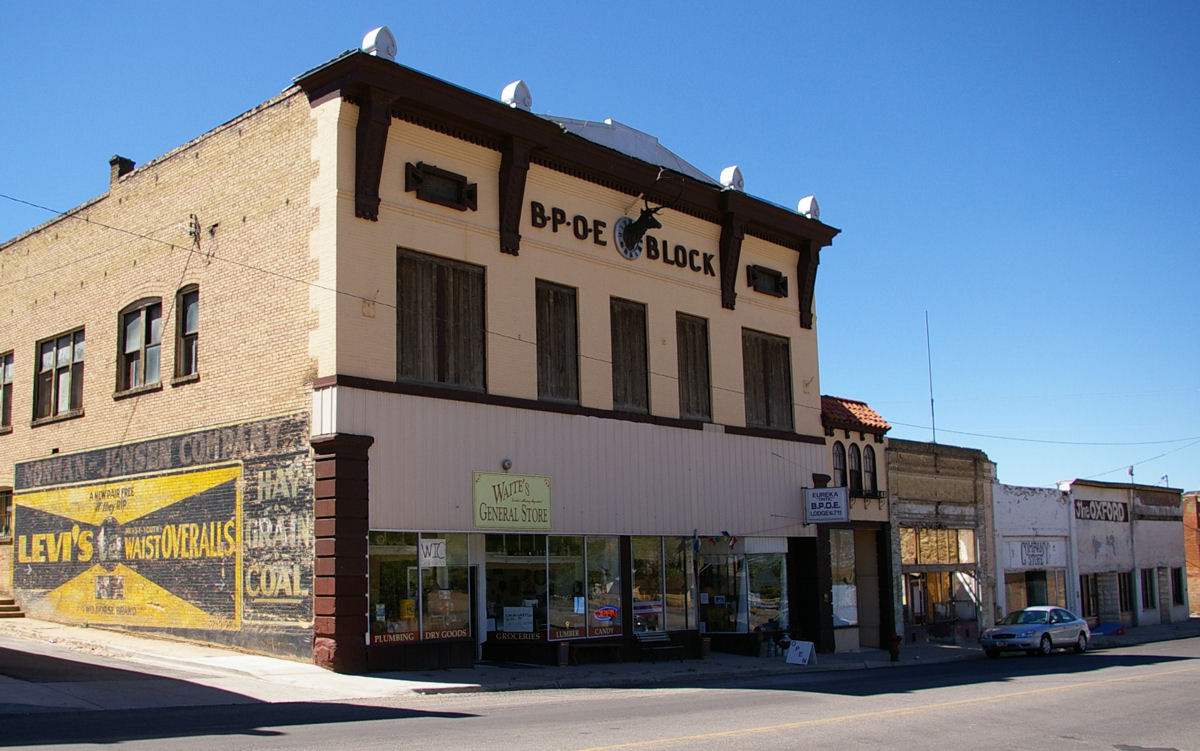
- BPOE Block in Eureka, August 2007

- Location in Juab County and state of Utah
- Coordinates: 39°57′18″N 112°6′59″W
- Country: United States
- State: Utah
- County: Juab
- Founded: 1870
- Incorporated: November 8, 1892
- Named for: Eureka

Area
  - Total: 1.48 sq mi (3.84 km^{2})
  - Land: 1.48 sq mi (3.84 km^{2})
  - Water: 0 sq mi (0.00 km^{2})
- Elevation: 6,430 ft (1,960 m)

Population (2020)
  - Total: 662
  - Density: 477/sq mi (184.3/km^{2})
- Time zone: UTC-7 (Mountain (MST))
  - Summer (DST): UTC-6 (MDT)
- ZIP code: 84628
- Area code: 435
- FIPS code: 49-24080
- GNIS feature ID: 1437974
- Website: eureka.utah.gov
- Eureka Historic District
- U.S. National Register of Historic Places
- U.S. Historic district
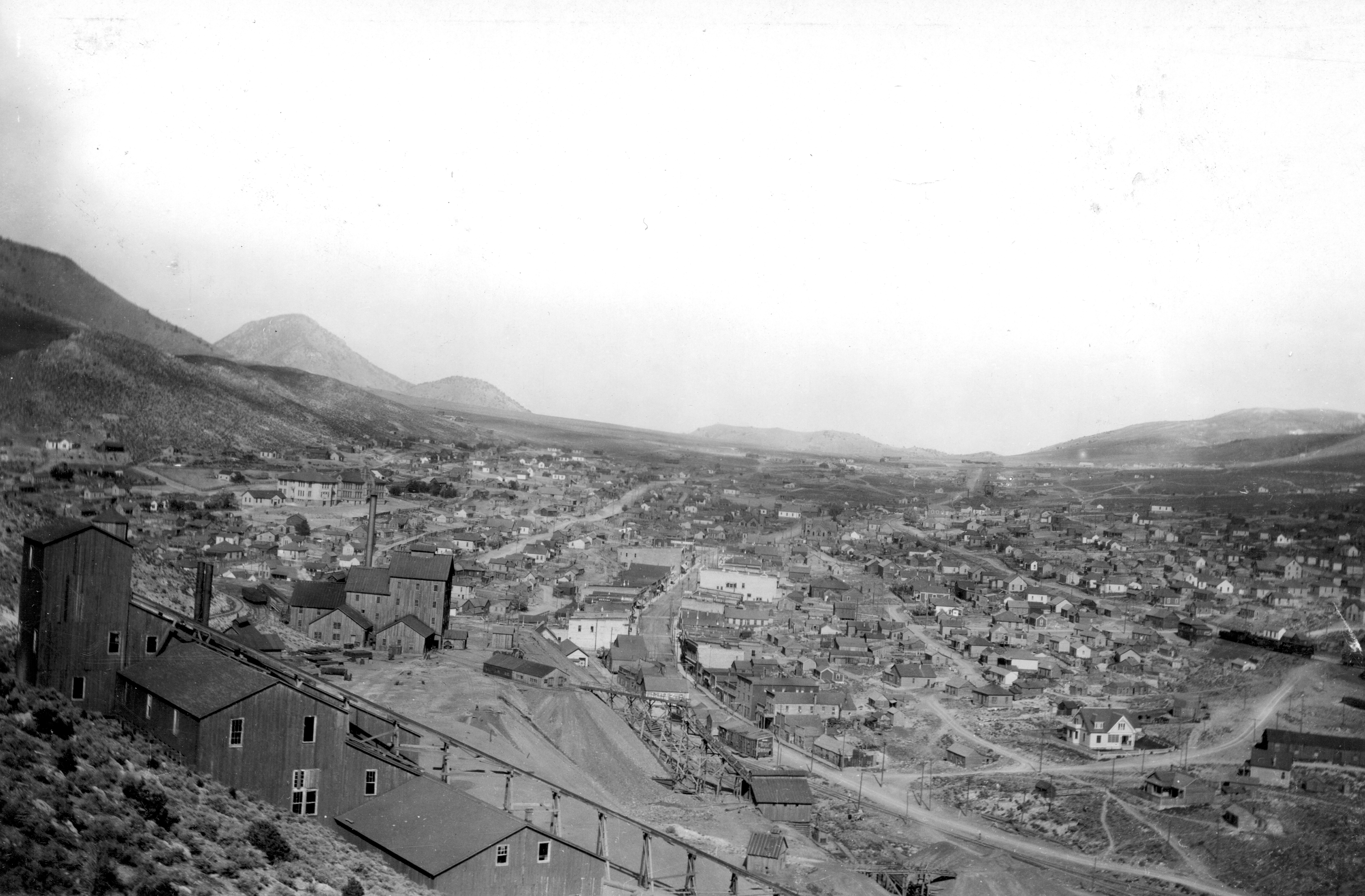
- Tintic District at Eureka in 1911

- Location within Utah Location within the United States
- Location: Coterminous with the city
- Built: 1892
- Architect: Multiple
- Architectural style: Prairie School, Bungalow/Craftsman, Saltbox
- MPS: Tintic Mining District MRA
- NRHP reference No.: 79002514
- Added to NRHP: March 14, 1979

Eureka is a city in Juab County, Utah, United States. It is part of the Provo–Orem metropolitan area. The population was 662 at the 2020 census, down from 669 in 2010.

The city was named after the Greek word eureka, meaning "I have found it!"

== Geography ==
Eureka is located in northern Juab County at 39°57′18″N 112°6′59″W (39.954974, -112.116364). It sits in the East Tintic Mountains at an elevation of 6,430 feet (1,960 m) above sea level. The northeast boundary of the city is the Utah County line, following the height of land. 7,828-foot (2,386 m) Packard Peak is to the north, while 8,048-foot (2,453 m) Godiva Mountain and 7,917-foot (2,413 m) Eureka Ridge are to the south.

U.S. Route 6 forms Main Street through Eureka, leading east 20 miles (32 km) to Santaquin and southwest 51 miles (82 km) to Delta.

According to the United States Census Bureau, Eureka has a total area of 1.5 square miles (3.9 km^{2}), all land.

=== Climate ===
This climatic region is typified by large seasonal temperature differences, with warm to hot (and often humid) summers and cold (sometimes severely cold) winters. According to the Köppen Climate Classification system, Eureka has a humid continental climate, abbreviated "Dfb" on climate maps.

== Demographics ==
Historical population
Census	Pop.	Note	%±
1880	122		—
1890	1,733		1,320.5%
1900	3,085		78.0%
1910	3,416		10.7%
1920	3,608		5.6%
1930	3,041		−15.7%
1940	2,292		−24.6%
1950	1,318		−42.5%
1960	771		−41.5%
1970	753		−2.3%
1980	670		−11.0%
1990	562		−16.1%
2000	766		36.3%
2010	669		−12.7%
2020	662		−1.0%
Source: U.S. Census Bureau

=== 2020 census ===
As of the 2020 census, Eureka had a population of 662. The median age was 40.6 years. 21.9% of residents were under the age of 18 and 17.4% of residents were 65 years of age or older. For every 100 females there were 101.8 males, and for every 100 females age 18 and over there were 101.2 males age 18 and over.

0.0% of residents lived in urban areas, while 100.0% lived in rural areas.

There were 261 households in Eureka, of which 33.0% had children under the age of 18 living in them. Of all households, 54.4% were married-couple households, 19.2% were households with a male householder and no spouse or partner present, and 20.3% were households with a female householder and no spouse or partner present. About 19.9% of all households were made up of individuals and 9.5% had someone living alone who was 65 years of age or older.

There were 290 housing units, of which 10.0% were vacant. The homeowner vacancy rate was 1.7% and the rental vacancy rate was 9.3%.

Racial composition as of the 2020 census
Race	Number	Percent
White	618	93.4%
Black or African American	6	0.9%
American Indian and Alaska Native	0	0.0%
Asian	0	0.0%
Native Hawaiian and Other Pacific Islander	3	0.5%
Some other race	17	2.6%
Two or more races	18	2.7%
Hispanic or Latino (of any race)	46	6.9%

=== 2000 census ===
As of the 2000 census, there were 766 people, 271 households, and 197 families residing in the city. The population density was 521.4 people per square mile (201.2/km^{2}). There were 342 housing units at an average density of 232.8 per square mile (89.8/km^{2}). The racial makeup of the city was 97.65% White, 1.04% Native American, 0.13% Asian, 0.13% Pacific Islander, 0.26% from other races, and 0.78% from two or more races. Hispanic or Latino of any race were 2.35% of the population.

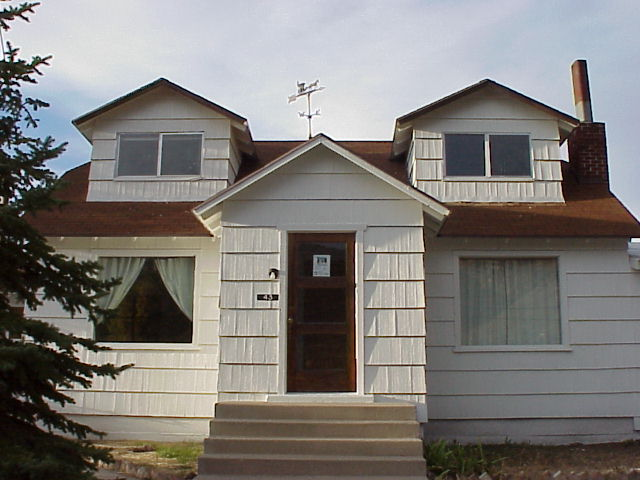
Typical home in Eureka, August 2009

There were 271 households, out of which 39.1% had children under the age of 18 living with them, 56.8% were married couples living together, 8.9% had a female householder with no husband present, and 27.3% were non-families. 24.0% of all households were made up of individuals, and 13.7% had someone living alone who was 65 years of age or older. The average household size was 2.83 and the average family size was 3.37.

In the city, the population was spread out, with 33.2% under the age of 18, 9.1% from 18 to 24, 27.7% from 25 to 44, 18.8% from 45 to 64, and 11.2% who were 65 years of age or older. The median age was 30 years. For every 100 females, there were 103.2 males. For every 100 females age 18 and over, there were 102.4 males.

The median income for a household in the city was $36,875, and the median income for a family was $43,077. Males had a median income of $35,938 versus $26,563 for females. The per capita income for the city was $14,534. About 6.3% of families and 9.9% of the population were below the poverty line, including 10.5% of those under age 18 and 12.2% of those age 65 or over.

== Mining history ==
Eureka was originally known as Ruby Hollow before it developed into a bustling mining town. Incorporated as a city in 1892, Eureka became the financial center for the Tintic Mining District, a wealthy gold and silver mining area in Utah and Juab counties. The district was organized in 1869 and by 1899 became one of the top mineral-producing areas in Utah. The Eureka Micropolitan Statistical Area housed the "Big Four" mines—Bullion Beck and Champion, Centennial Eureka, Eureka Hill, and Gemini-and later the Chief Consolidated Mining Company. Mining entrepreneurs such as John Q. Packard, John Beck (who personally funded the construction of the Eureka LDS Church Meetinghouse in 1902), Jesse Knight, and Walter Fitch Sr. were important figures in Eureka and Tintic history.

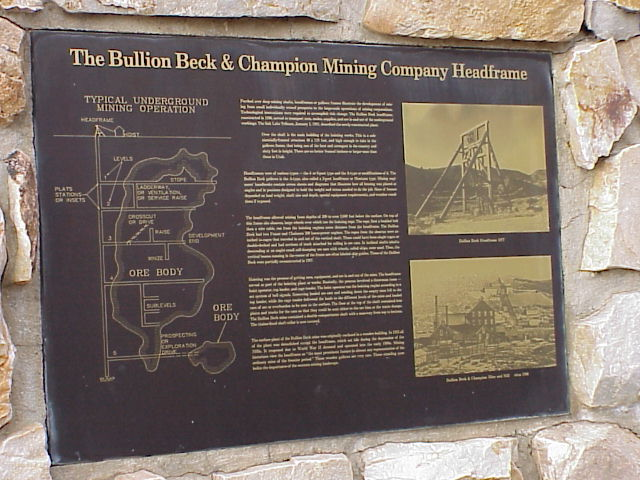
Plaque explaining a mining headframe, August 2009

Eureka housed business establishments, including the second-ever JCPenney store (then called the Golden Rule Store), financial institutions, local and county governmental buildings including Eureka City Hall (1899) and a Juab County Courthouse (1892), various churches, and the meeting places for numerous labor, social, and fraternal organizations. In the early 1900s, Eureka was a powerhouse in the state when it came to soccer. They won the state title in 1905, 1907 and 1909. In 1979, Eureka was placed in the National Register of Historic Places as part of the Tintic Mining District Multiple Resource Area, recognizing the importance of remaining buildings and sites.

== Notable person ==
- Frank Zamboni, inventor of the modern ice resurfacer and founder of Zamboni Company

== See also ==
- List of municipalities in Utah
- National Register of Historic Places listings in Juab County, Utah
- Tintic High School
- Tintic Standard Reduction Mill
