= National Register of Historic Places listings in Nez Perce County, Idaho =

Location of Nez Perce County in Idaho

This is a list of the National Register of Historic Places listings in Nez Perce County, Idaho.

This is intended to be a complete list of the properties and districts on the National Register of Historic Places in Nez Perce County, Idaho, United States. Latitude and longitude coordinates are provided for many National Register properties and districts; these locations may be seen together in a map.

There are 32 properties and districts listed on the National Register in the county.

This National Park Service list is complete through NPS recent listings posted March 6, 2026.

== Current listings ==
	Name on the Register	Image	Date listed	Location	City or town	Description
1	American Women's League Chapter House	American Women's League Chapter House	September 4, 1986 (#86002158)	217 N. Main St. 46°28′30″N 116°25′20″W	Peck	
2	James Asposas House	James Asposas House	November 25, 1994 (#94001366)	1610 15th Ave. 46°24′17″N 117°00′32″W	Lewiston	
3	Frank Booth House	Frank Booth House	November 25, 1994 (#94001367)	1608 17th Ave. 46°24′10″N 117°00′32″W	Lewiston	
4	Breier Building	Breier Building	June 13, 1986 (#86001261)	631–633 Main St. 46°25′16″N 117°01′29″W	Lewiston	
5	Carnegie Library	Carnegie Library	June 13, 2018 (#100002548)	101 5th St. 46°25′10″N 117°01′37″W	Lewiston	
6	Children's Home Finding and Aid Society of North Idaho	Children's Home Finding and Aid Society of North Idaho	February 23, 2007 (#07000090)	1805 19th Ave. 46°24′05″N 117°00′22″W	Lewiston	
7	Clearwater River Camas Prairie Railroad Bridge	Clearwater River Camas Prairie Railroad Bridge	September 23, 2025 (#100012324)	U.S. Highway 12/Clearwater River; 46°25′33″N 117°01′33″W	Lewiston	
8	First Christian Church	First Christian Church	August 31, 1978 (#78001083)	7th Ave. and 7th St. 46°24′50″N 117°01′21″W	Lewiston	
9	First Lapwai Bank	First Lapwai Bank	March 12, 1980 (#80001331)	302 W. 1st St. 46°24′11″N 116°48′23″W	Lapwai	Building no longer exists.
10	First Presbyterian Church	First Presbyterian Church	March 12, 1980 (#80001332)	Locust and 1st St., E. 46°24′13″N 116°48′12″W	Lapwai	
11	Garfield School	Garfield School	April 15, 1982 (#82002513)	2912 5th Ave. 46°24′55″N 116°59′26″W	Lewiston	
12	Hasotino	Hasotino	April 2, 1976 (#76000678)	Address Restricted	Lewiston	
13	Hatwai Village Site	Hatwai Village Site	November 8, 1982 (#82000353)	Address Restricted	Lewiston	
14	Hells Canyon Archeological District	Hells Canyon Archeological District	August 10, 1984 (#84000984)	Address Restricted	Lewiston	Extends into Adams and Idaho counties and Wallowa County, Oregon
15	Patrick J. and Lydia Hester House	Patrick J. and Lydia Hester House	November 25, 1994 (#94001365)	1622 15th Ave. 46°24′17″N 117°00′30″W	Lewiston	
16	Idaho Grocery Warehouse and Annex	Idaho Grocery Warehouse and Annex	November 17, 1982 (#82000354)	1209 Main St. 46°25′08″N 117°01′01″W	Lewiston	
17	Henry C. Kettenbach House	Henry C. Kettenbach House	February 7, 1978 (#78001084)	1026 9th Ave. 46°24′40″N 117°01′02″W	Lewiston	Relocated
18	Lenore Site	Lenore Site	November 21, 1974 (#74000284)	Address Restricted	Lenore	
19	Lewiston City Hall	Lewiston City Hall	November 17, 1982 (#82000355)	207 3rd St. 46°25′20″N 117°01′47″W	Lewiston	
20	Lewiston Depot	Lewiston Depot	May 7, 1973 (#73000687)	13th and Main Sts. 46°25′08″N 117°00′58″W	Lewiston	
21	Lewiston Historic District	Lewiston Historic District	June 5, 1975 (#75000637)	Irregular pattern between 1st and 5th Sts. and B St. and the Snake River; also roughly bounded by 1st, B, 6th, and F Sts.; also roughly bounded by Beachey, Capital, D, 9th, 10th, F, 5th & 6th Sts. 46°25′18″N 117°01′45″W	Lewiston	Additional addresses represent boundary increases approved September 7, 1984 and November 21, 2018.
22	Lewiston Methodist Church	Lewiston Methodist Church	September 20, 1979 (#79000802)	805 6th Ave. 46°24′53″N 117°01′16″W	Lewiston	
23	Lewiston Vineyards Gates	Lewiston Vineyards Gates	April 14, 1983 (#83000288)	Near 18th Ave. and 10th St. 46°24′03″N 117°01′04″W	Lewiston	
24	Lower Salmon River Archeological District	Lower Salmon River Archeological District	September 4, 1986 (#86002170)	Address Restricted	Waha	Extends into Idaho and Lewis counties
25	William and Elizabeth McLaren House	William and Elizabeth McLaren House	November 6, 1992 (#92001413)	1602 15th Ave. 46°24′17″N 117°00′33″W	Lewiston	
26	Nave Apartments	Nave Apartments	August 3, 1978 (#78001085)	600 block of 8th St. 46°24′50″N 117°01′19″W	Lewiston	
27	Nez Perce Snake River Archeological District	Nez Perce Snake River Archeological District	December 22, 1978 (#78001086)	Includes the confluence of Redbird Creek and the Snake River; 46°14′04″N 116°57′20″W	Lewiston	
28	St. Stanislaus Catholic Church	St. Stanislaus Catholic Church	February 7, 1978 (#78001087)	633 5th Ave. 46°24′57″N 117°01′26″W	Lewiston	
29	Agnes M. Tamblyn House	Agnes M. Tamblyn House	November 25, 1994 (#94001364)	1506 17th Ave. 46°24′10″N 117°00′38″W	Lewiston	
30	Gaylord Thompson House	Gaylord Thompson House	May 4, 1992 (#92000419)	1824 17th Ave. 46°24′10″N 117°00′19″W	Lewiston	
31	Twenty-One Ranchhouse	Twenty-One Ranchhouse	December 18, 1978 (#78001088)	7570 Waha Rd. 46°13′26″N 116°51′33″W	Lewiston	
32	W. R. and Louisa E. Wyatt House	W. R. and Louisa E. Wyatt House	November 25, 1994 (#94001362)	1524 18th Ave. 46°24′06″N 117°00′35″W	Lewiston	

== See also ==
- List of National Historic Landmarks in Idaho
- National Register of Historic Places listings in Idaho
