= Booth House =

Booth House may refer to:

in Australia

- Booth House, Sydney, Bridge Street, Sydney, example of Functionalism (architecture)

in Canada

- Booth House (Ottawa)

in the United States (by state)

- Booth-Weir House, McRae, Arkansas, listed on the National Register of Historic Places (NRHP) in White County, Arkansas
- Green Booth House, Searcy, Arkansas, listed on the NRHP in White County
- Kerr-Booth House, Searcy, Arkansas, listed on the NRHP in White County
- Call-Booth House, Robles, California, listed on the NRHP in San Luis Obispo County
- Nathan B. Booth House, Stratford, Connecticut, NRHP-listed, in Fairfield County
- Boothe Homestead, Stratford, Connecticut, NRHP-listed, in Fairfield County
- Frank Booth House, Lewiston, Idaho, listed on the NRHP in Nez Perce County
- Booth-Dunham Estate, Texas Charter Township, Michigan, listed on the NRHP in Kalamazoo County
- Bradshaw-Booth House, Enterprise, Mississippi, listed on the NRHP in Clarke County
- Booth House (Bedford, New York), modern house designed by Philip Johnson
- Evangeline Booth House, Hartsdale, New York, listed on the NRHP in Westchester County
- Booth Homestead, Guernsey, Ohio, NRHP-listed, in Guernsey County
- Dr. J. C. Booth House, Lebanon, Oregon, listed on the NRHP in Linn County
- Booth Farm, Boothwyn, Pennsylvania, NRHP-listed, in Delaware County
- Edwin Robert Booth House, Nephi, Utah, listed on the NRHP in Juab County
- Oscar M. Booth House, Nephi, Utah, listed on the NRHP in Juab County
- Clinger-Booth House, Orem, Utah, listed on the NRHP in Utah County
- John E. Booth House, Provo, Utah, listed on the NRHP in Utah County
- Booth-Parsons House, Salt Lake City, Utah, listed on the NRHP in Salt Lake County
- Booth-Lovelace House, Hardy, Virginia, listed on the NRHP in Franklin County
- Booth Cooperage, Bayfield, Wisconsin, listed on the NRHP in Bayfield County
- J. C. Booth House, Saylesville, Wisconsin, listed on the NRHP in Waukesha County

== See also ==
- Booth Hotel, Independence, Kansas, listed on the NRHP in Montgomery County, Kansas
- Booth Theater (Independence, Kansas), NRHP-listed
- Booth Site, Mayetta, Kansas, NRHP-listed, listed on the NRHP in Jackson County, Kansas
- Booth Post No. 130-Grand Army of the Republic Hall, Grand Meadow, Minnesota, NRHP-listed, in Mower County
- O. H. Booth Hose Company, Poughkeepsie, New York, NRHP-listed
