= Celilo Miles =

Native American fashion model

Celilo Miles (born 1995) is a Native American fashion model and member of the Nez Percé tribe. She began her career as a wildland firefighter in Idaho, and in 2017, she moved to NYC to pursue modeling. Her most famous modeling appearance was in Victoria's Secret 2022 Love Campaign launched on Valentine's Day, featuring women from different backgrounds. She is one of the first Native American models to be featured in the company's hundred-year history.

== Early life ==
Celilo Miles was born in Lapwai, Idaho, where she was raised on the Nez Percé reservation. As an avid nature lover, she grew up fishing and huckleberry picking with her family. At 12, she was recognized by her first modeling agency, which invited her to come audition. Growing up she enjoyed basketball, and she became a firefighter for the tribe through the inspiration of her older sister. She sprung into her modeling career in 2017, where she moved to New York to chase her dreams and one day hope to model for a big brand (FIND QUOTE). While in New York she pursued multiple side jobs including working part-time at a steakhouse. However, tragic news caused her to shift her career when she heard of her brother AJ passing away from a fentanyl overdose in 2019. This event caused Miles to move back to Idaho where she rededicated herself as a firefighter. Months later, Miles received a call from Victoria's Secret offering her a modeling job as part of their 2022 Love Cloud Campaign.

== Career ==
=== Modeling ===
Her modeling career began at the age of 12 at a scouting event in Moscow, Idaho. Her next scouting event was in Seattle, Washington where her talents and unique upbringing were recognized by more modeling agencies, leading her to start receiving more and more calls. At the age of 14, she signed with her first agent. During her career, Miles was pressured to lose weight and conform to the slim body standards of the modeling industry. As these standards were unreasonable, it wasn't sustainable for Miles, and this experience led her to take a break from modeling to pursue firefighting back home. In early 2022, Miles returned to modeling as a part of Victoria's Secret Love Cloud Collection. This is the first modeling campaign that Miles felt comfortable with because she was free from conforming to any beauty standards that the industry held.

=== Wildland firefighting ===
Miles is a Nez Percé enrolled tribal member, also known as Nimiipuu. Her older sister, Selina, inspired her to pursue firefighting from a young age. With a passion to preserve her homeland and her community, Miles interned for the Nez Percé Environmental Restoration and Wasteland program. By 2016, she became a part of her tribe's 20 man fire crew department. Miles believed that firefighting “was such a calling for her” and that by summer of 2020, she would complete her fourth full fire season. Miles changed her focus from modeling part-time to firefighting full-time in 2019 after she lost her brother to a Fentanyl overdose.

== Education ==
As of 2022, Miles is currently attending school for communication studies at Arizona State University while pursuing modeling as a part-time occupation. Miles also has plans of transferring to the University of Idaho to be closer to her family.
