= William McLaren House =

William McLaren House may refer to:

- William McLaren House (Lewiston, Idaho), listed on the National Register of Historic Places in Nez Perce County, Idaho
- William McLaren House (Stevensville, Montana), listed on the National Register of Historic Places in Ravalli County, Montana
