= James H. Nave =

American architect

- Born: 1864; Fort Wayne, Indiana, U.S.
- Died: October 6, 1949 (aged 84–85); Lewiston, Idaho, U.S.
- Resting place: Normal Hill Cemetery, Lewiston, Idaho, U.S.
- Occupation: Architect
- Spouse: 2, including Mae Russell
- Children: 2 sons, 1 daughter

James H. Nave (1864 - October 6, 1949) was an American architect based in Lewiston, Idaho. He designed a number of works which are listed on the National Register of Historic Places (NRHP) for their architecture.

== Early life ==
Nave was born in Fort Wayne, Indiana in 1864. In 1903, Nave relocated to Lewiston, Idaho.

== Career ==
Nave and his firm competed with other architectural firms in Lewiston and in Spokane, Washington to get commissions to design public buildings, commercial blocks, and large homes. Nave's firm won a number of these commissions and is credited with 94 works between 1903 and 1923. Nave made his reputation primarily through designing schools, although he also designed two churches: St. Stanislaus and Lewiston's Baptist Church.

According to Elizabeth Egleston, "By 1909 Nave was obtaining commissions for commercial and institutional buildings as his residential business declined. His institutional work was Georgian Revival, while his commercial commissions were completed in the Romanesque and Renaissance Revival styles. In her book, Building Idaho, Jennifer Eastman Attebery writes that Nave's work shows a preference for stone and a 'fragmented use of classical motifs.' This affinity for stonework is not surprising, given the fact that he owned a stone quarry in nearby Clarkston [Washington], to which he devoted his energy after he left architectural work in 1933."

Works include:

- Bollinger Hotel (1903)
- James Asposas House, 1610 Fifteenth Ave., Lewiston, ID, NRHP-listed
- William and Elizabeth McLaren House (1904), 1602 15th Ave., Lewiston, ID, NRHP-listed
- Nave Apartments (1904), 600 block of 8th St., Lewiston, ID, built of sandstone from Nave's quarry, "Swallow's Nest". NRHP-listed
- Means Building (1905)
- St. Stanislaus Catholic Church (1905), 633 5th Ave., Lewiston, ID, NRHP-listed
- Agnes M. Tamblyn House (1905), 1506 Seventeenth Ave., Lewiston, ID, NRHP-listed
- Kettenbach Building (1906)
- Frank Booth House (1907), 1608 Seventeenth Ave., Lewiston, ID, NRHP-listed
- First Presbyterian Church(1909), Locust and 1st St., E., Lapwai, ID, NRHP-listed
- Garfield School (1910), 2912 5th Ave., Lewiston, ID, NRHP-listed
- Clarkston Public Library (1913), 1001 6th St., Clarkston, WA, NHRP-listed
- Gaylord Thompson House (1913), 1824 Seventeenth Ave., Lewiston, ID, NRHP-listed
- Breier Building (1923), 631-33 Main St., Lewiston, ID, NRHP-listed
- Bank of Juliaetta, 301 Main St., Juliaetta, ID, NRHP-listed
- Patrick J. and Lydia Hester House, 1622 Fifteenth Ave., Lewiston, ID, NRHP-listed
- Lewiston's Baptist church
- a number of schools in Camas Prairie, Idaho
- the Wilkes block in Grangeville, Idaho
- a bank in Glendale, Arizona
- the Bradford Building in Clarkston, Washington, a three-story steel and glass commercial structure

== Personal life and death ==
Nave was married twice. After his first wife died, he married Mae Russell in 1937. He had two sons and one daughter. He died on October 6, 1949, in Lewiston, Idaho.
