= First Lapwai Bank =

- U.S. National Register of Historic Places
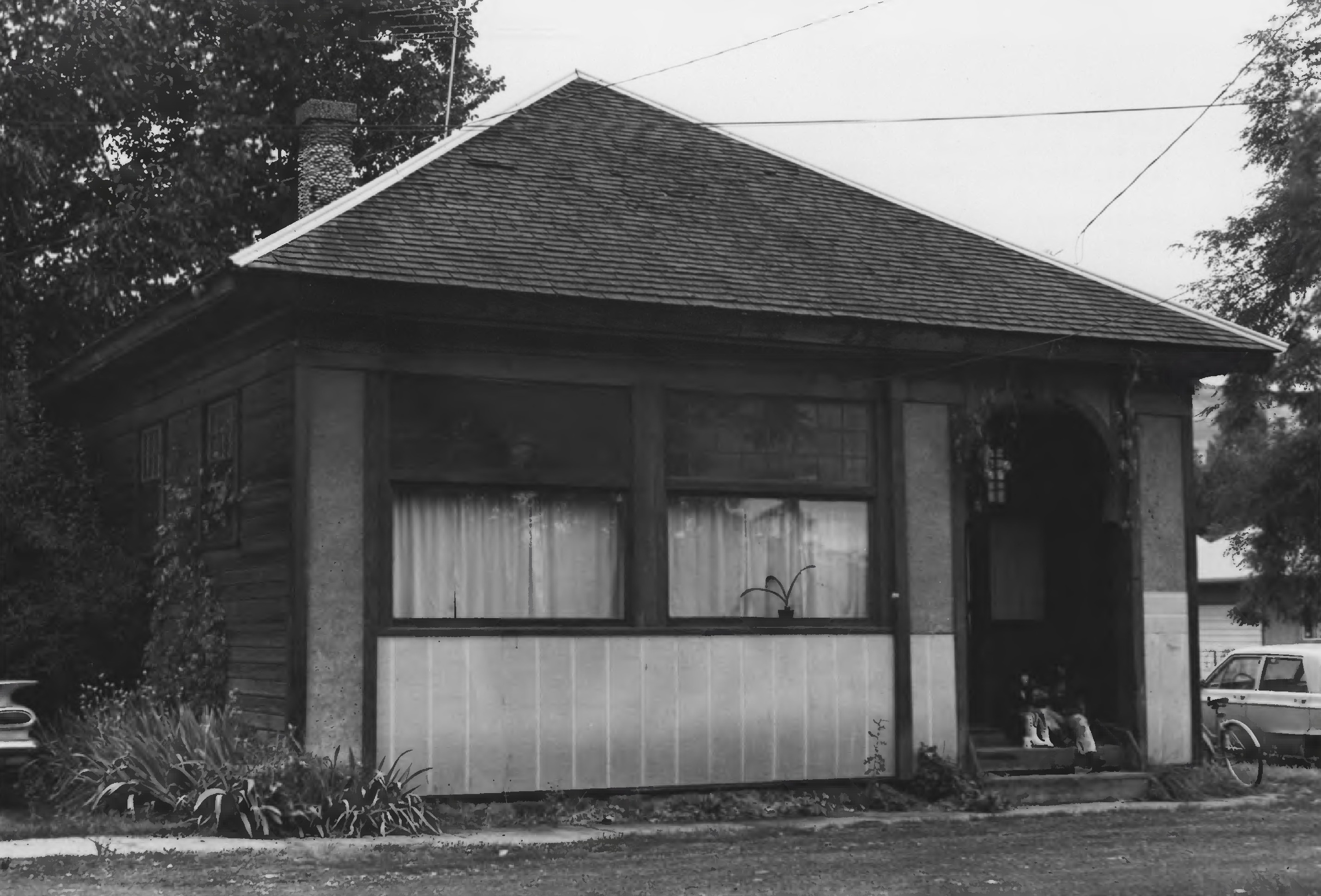

- Location within Idaho
- Location: 302 W. 1st St., Lapwai, Idaho
- Coordinates: 46°24′11″N 116°48′23″W
- Area: less than one acre
- Built: 1909
- NRHP reference No.: 80001331
- Added to NRHP: March 12, 1980

The First Lapwai Bank, at 302 W. 1st St. in Lapwai, Idaho, was built in 1909. It was listed on the National Register of Historic Places in 1980.

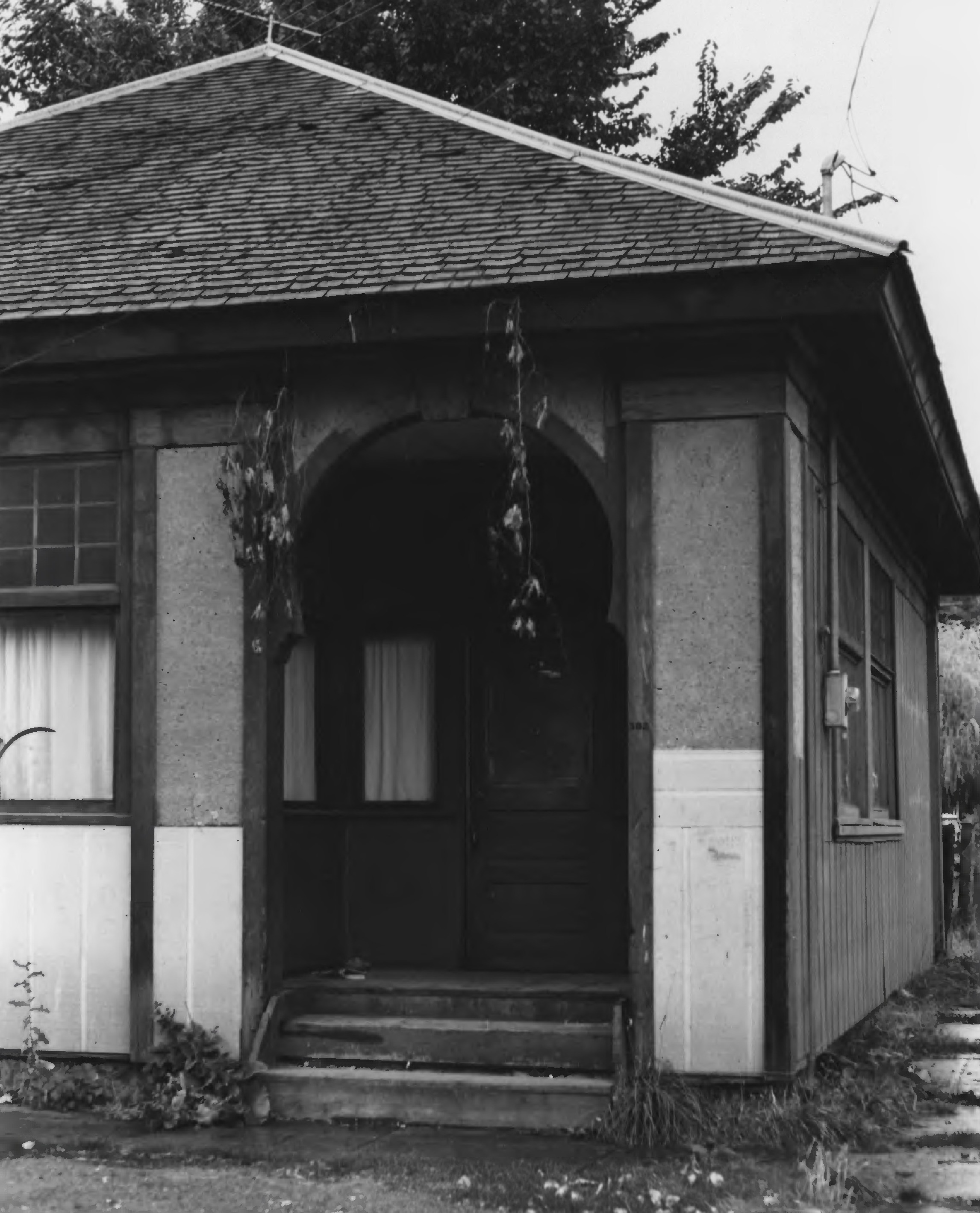
Another view

The building no longer exists.
