= Clarkston Public Library =

Historic building in Washington, U.S.

- U.S. National Register of Historic Places
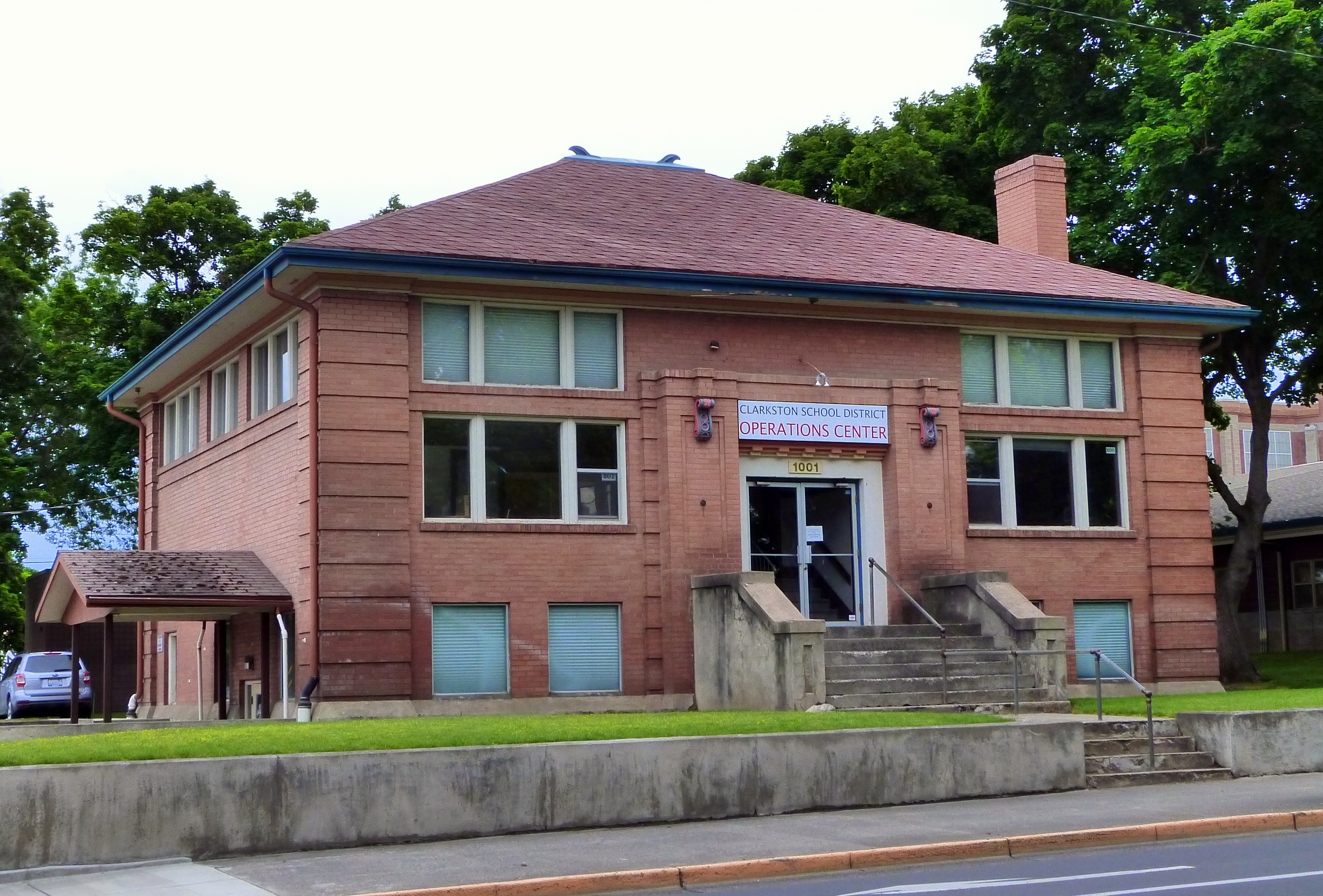

- Location within Washington (state) Location within the United States
- Location: 1001 6th Street, Clarkston, Washington
- Coordinates: 46°24′38″N 117°02′43″W
- Area: less than one acre
- Built: 1913
- Architect: James H. Nave
- MPS: Carnegie Libraries of Washington TR
- NRHP reference No.: 82004193
- Added to NRHP: August 3, 1982

The Clarkston Public Library, in Clarkston in Asotin County, Washington, was built in 1913 as a Carnegie library. Also known as the Asotin County Library, it was listed on the National Register of Historic Places in 1982.

It is a square-plan two-story building of yellow-red brick. It was funded by a $10,000 grant from Andrew Carnegie, obligating the community to spend $1,000 per year in maintenance. As that level of spending was perceived to be onerous for the small city of Clarkston, it was negotiated that the taxing entity to be designated would be the school district, which presumably had a larger base. Lewiston, Idaho architect James H. Nave was commissioned to prepare the designs for an $8,000 building, with the remainder of the funds going towards interior furnishings. In 1981 the library served as a regional library for southeast Washington.

The building now serves as the Career & Technical Education Operations Building for the Clarkston School District.
