= Breier Building =

- U.S. National Register of Historic Places
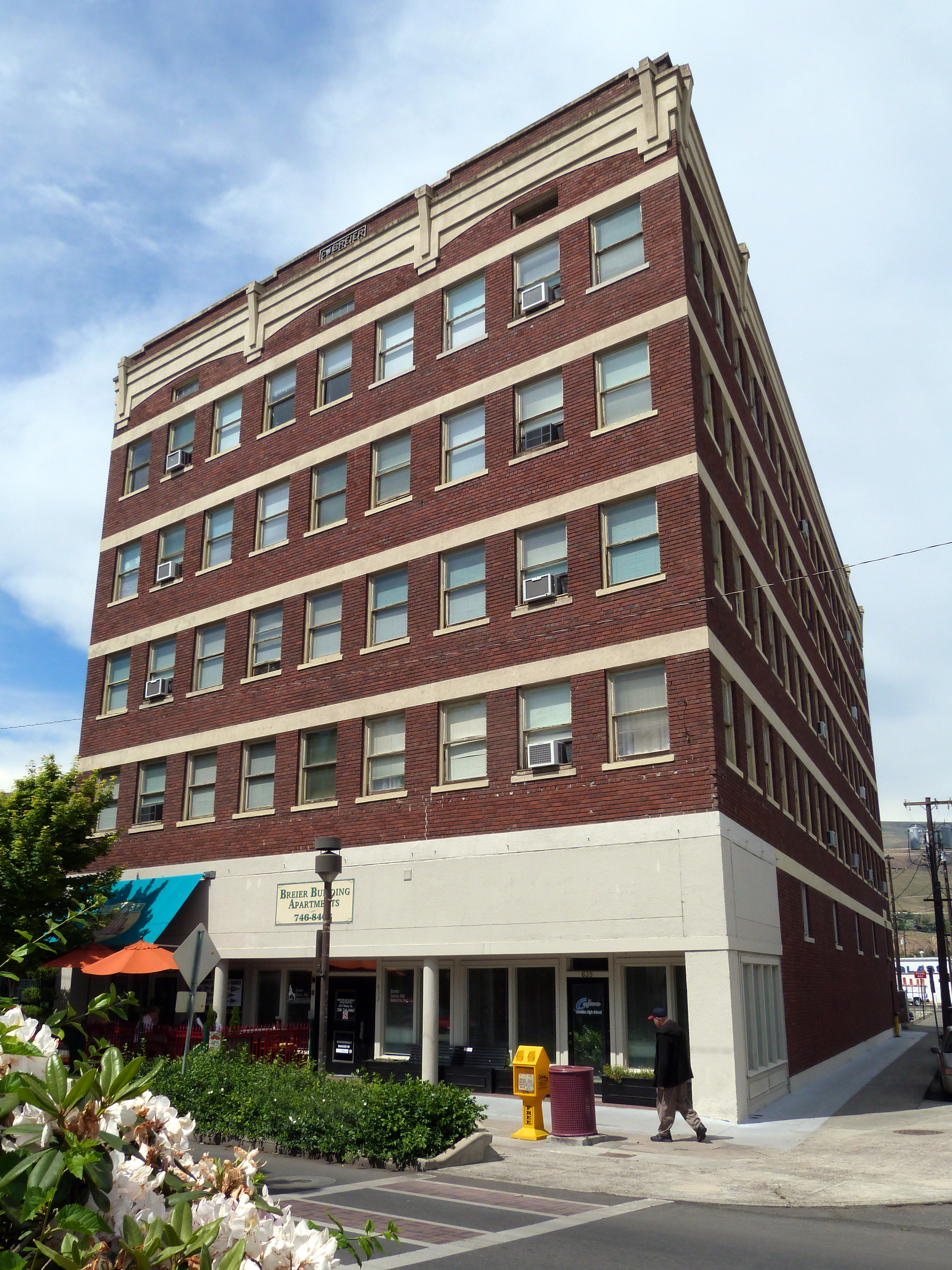

- Location within Idaho Location within the United States
- Location: 631–633 Main St., Lewiston, Idaho
- Coordinates: 46°25′16″N 117°01′29″W
- Area: less than one acre
- Built: 1923
- Architect: James H. Nave
- Architectural style: Chicago, Chicago Commercial
- NRHP reference No.: 86001261
- Added to NRHP: June 13, 1986

The Breier Building, at 631–633 Main St. in Lewiston, Idaho, was built in 1923. It was listed on the National Register of Historic Places in 1986.

It is five stories tall, not counting a mezzanine level sometimes referred to as its second story. It has a flat roof and a low parapet. It was designed by Lewiston architect James H. Nave.

Its National Register nomination describes it as Chicago School in style:

A simply decorated and handsome structure, the Breier Building is an example of the Chicago School Commercial style. Typical characteristics of this style are masonry clad exteriors and a higher proportion of windows to wall space than was used in previous styles. While geometric and foliate adornment are more typical of earlier-period Chicago School Commercial-style buildings, later examples like the Breier Building are more stark and stripped of ornament. The invention of the elevator and the development of structural steel framing brought about the construction of taller buildings, the "skyscrapers."
