= Booth-Dunham Estate =

- U.S. National Register of Historic Places
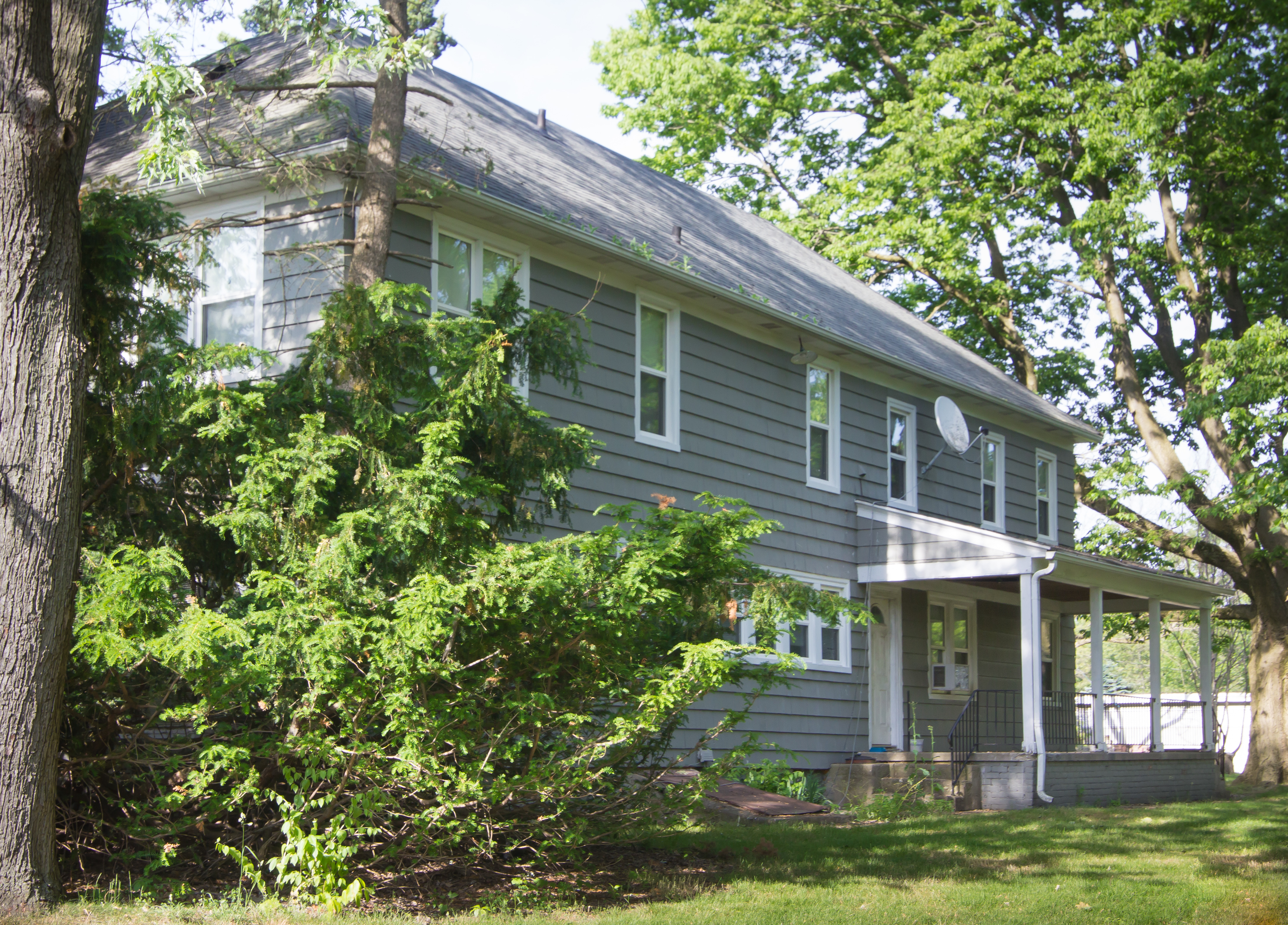
- Interactive map
- Location: 6059 S. Ninth St., Texas Charter Township, Michigan
- Coordinates: 42°13′45″N 85°40′37″W
- Area: 22 acres (8.9 ha)
- Built: c. 1840
- Architectural style: Greek Revival
- NRHP reference No.: 98000271
- Added to NRHP: April 1, 1998

The Booth-Dunham Estate is a single-family home located at 6059 South Ninth Street Texas Charter Township near Kalamazoo, Michigan. It was listed on the National Register of Historic Places in 1998.

== History ==
In 1836, DeForest and Catharine Maria (Booth) Manice of Hempstead, New York, purchased over 1000 acres of land in this portion of Kalamazoo Count as an investment. In 1841, the Manices allowed Catharine's brother, William Booth, to settle on a portion of the land they had purchased. William and Abigail Booth moved to the land later that year from their home town of Stratford, Connecticut, with their two sons. The Booths farmed the land for the next two decades, with William Booth serving in various public positions in the local government. During this time, he also constructed the first part of the farmhouse on the land.

William Booth died in 1864, and in 1866 Thomas P. Dunham purchased the farm. Dunham was born in Junius, New York, in 1822. He was a grocer in Chicago and a sugar broker in New Orleans for several years before coming to Kalamazoo County in 1859 with his wife Emily (Braden) Dunham. Thomas was active in local affairs, serving as Highway Commissioner and as director of the nearby school. The Dunhams added onto the house in about 1875. Thomas died in 1895, after turning the farm over to his eldest son Charles. Charles died in 1909, and the farm was turned over to the second son Edgar. The family operated the farm until 1946, when the last of Thomas's children died. In 1952, the Sprau family bought the farm. In 1967, they sold the bulk of the acreage to Kalamazoo Valley Community College for their new campus.

== Description ==
The Booth-Dunham Estate includes a farm house, a large barn, a tool shed, a wood shed and a wellhouse sitting on a 22-acre parcel of land. The house is a 1 1/2-story, T-shaped side-gable Greek Revival structure with a timber frame and a fieldstone foundation. A rear ell is attached behind the house. The house is clad with clapboard siding, and has a low-pitched roof and general symmetrical window placement typical of Greek Revival style. The front facade is almost perfectly symmetrical. The first floor has a centrally located front door flanked by pairs of none=over-six double hung windows with shutters. The second floor has three windows, with the central one slightly off center. A shed-roof porch supported by plain columns runs the width of the front of the house.

The barn is an eight-bay, timber-framed, side-gable structure with vertical wooden siding measuring 30 feet wide by 120 feet long. It was likely built about the same time as the house (about 1840). The toolshed is a single-story, side gable structure measuring 60 feet long by 16 feet wide. It dates from about the 1920s. The woodshed is a front gable, single story wood-frame building measuring approximately 20 feet long and 16 feet wide. The wellhouse is a pyramid roofed, concrete block building, measuring ten feet by yen feet, covering a six foot deep stone lined well pit. It likely dates from the 1920s.
