= First Presbyterian Church (Lapwai, Idaho) =

Historic church in Idaho, United States

- U.S. National Register of Historic Places
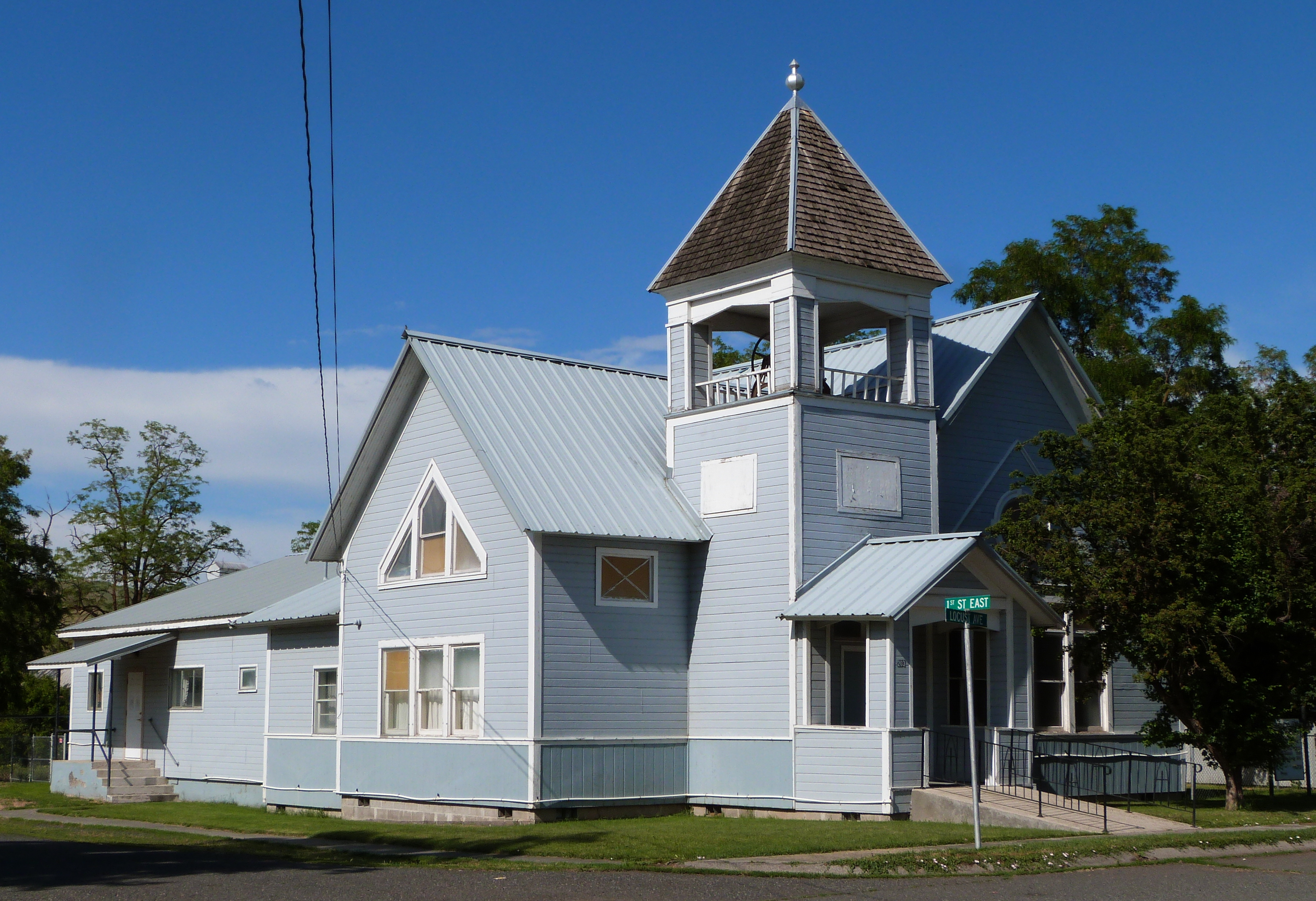
- The First Presbyterian Church in 2015

- Location within Idaho Location within the United States
- Location: Locust Avenue and 1st Street East; Lapwai, Idaho
- Coordinates: 46°24′13″N 116°48′12″W
- Area: less than one acre
- Built: 1909
- Built by: James Milton
- Architect: J.H. Nave
- NRHP reference No.: 80001332
- Added to NRHP: March 12, 1980

The First Presbyterian Church at Locust and 1st Street, East in Lapwai, Idaho is a historic Presbyterian church built in 1909. It was added to the National Register in 1980.

Its importance was described in its NRHP nomination:

The Lapwai First Presbyterian Church is architecturally and historically significant as a design of the well-known Lewiston architect J. H. Nave and as an important architectural symbol of organized Christianity in this Nez Perce Indian town. It is perhaps the best early building extant in present-day Lapwai. It is certainly the only early building in the town to substantially retain not only its original form but its original use, as Presbyterian services are still held there. It is a fine example of the efforts of a small congregation to house itself in a modest but stylish structure.

There was a Presbyterian mission active on the Nez Perce reservation active for a while before the Lapwai congregation was established in 1907. The architect, Nave, and contractor, James Milton, were selected by Indian Agent J.N. Alley in 1909. The church was built for $2,600, with some funds from citizens of Lapwai and neighborhing Sweetwater, Idaho, and with $800 from the Presbyterian Board of Building Erection in New York.
