= Gaylord Thompson House =

- U.S. National Register of Historic Places
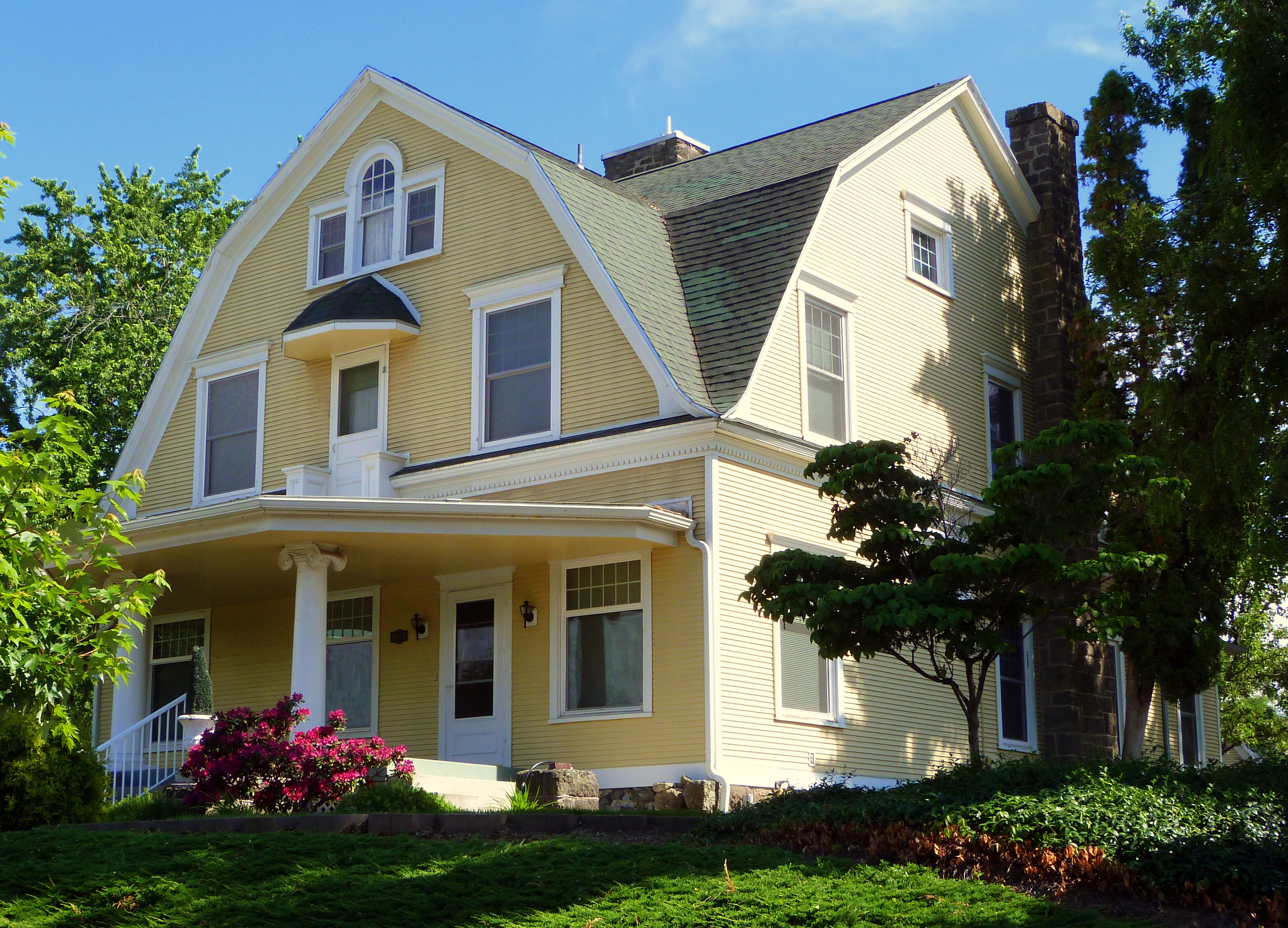

- Location within Idaho
- Location: 1824 Seventeenth Ave., Lewiston, Idaho
- Coordinates: 46°24′10″N 117°00′19″W
- Area: less than one acre
- Built: 1904
- Built by: Charles B. Chaffee
- Architect: James Nave
- Architectural style: Colonial Revival, Dutch Colonial
- NRHP reference No.: 92000419
- Added to NRHP: May 4, 1992

The Gaylord Thompson House, in Lewiston, Idaho, was built in 1904. It was listed on the National Register of Historic Places in 1992.

It was designed by architect James Nave and includes Colonial Revival style, in particular Dutch Colonial.
