= Booth-Weir House =

Historic house in Arkansas, United States

- U.S. National Register of Historic Places
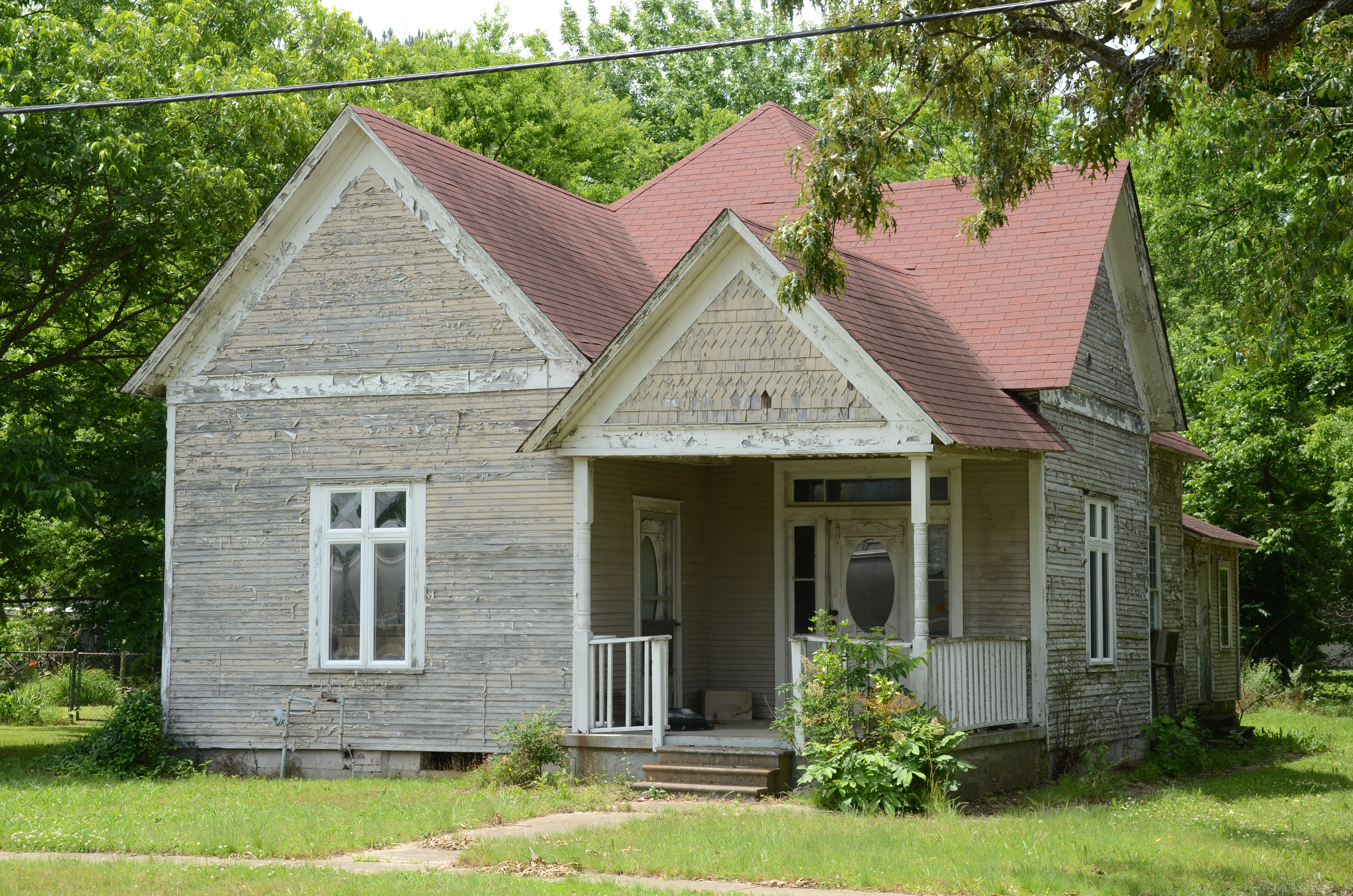

- Location within Arkansas Location within the United States
- Location: W. First St., McRae, Arkansas
- Coordinates: 35°7′11″N 91°48′54″W
- Area: less than one acre
- Built by: Forest Blevins
- Architectural style: Vernacular irregular plan
- MPS: White County MPS
- NRHP reference No.: 91001345
- Added to NRHP: September 5, 1991

The Booth-Weir House is a historic house on West First Street in McRae, Arkansas. It is a single-story wood-frame structure, with an irregular cross-gable configuration and a projecting gable-roof porch. It is finished in composition shingles and rests on brick piers. Built in 1911 for a railroad fireman, it is one of a few houses in McRae to survive the pre-World War I period, and is typical of vernacular construction of that period.

The house was listed on the National Register of Historic Places in 1991.

== See also ==
- National Register of Historic Places listings in White County, Arkansas
