= Agnes M. Tamblyn House =

- U.S. National Register of Historic Places
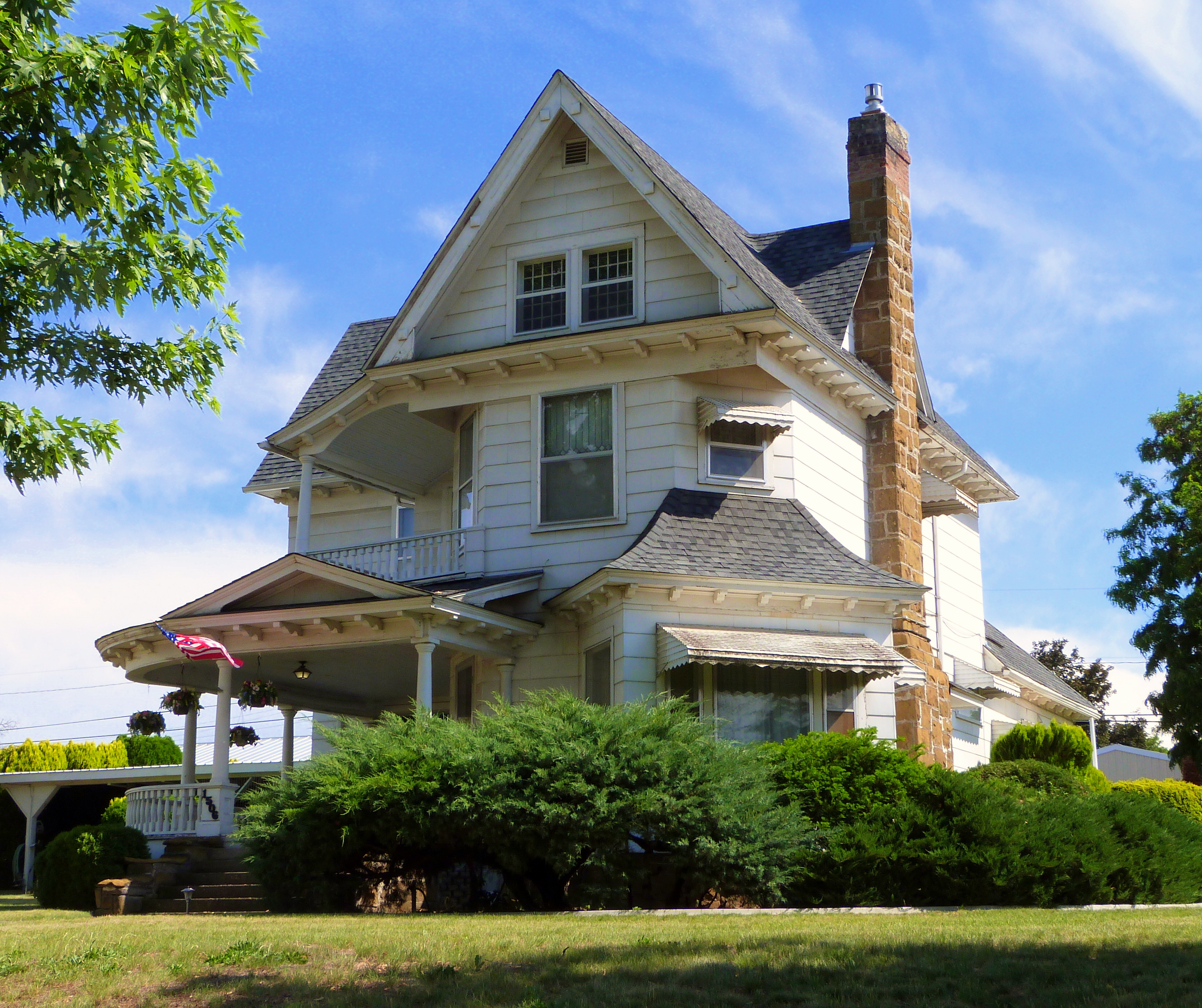

- Location within Idaho Location within the United States
- Location: 1506 Seventeenth Ave., Lewiston, Idaho
- Coordinates: 46°24′10″N 117°00′38″W
- Area: less than one acre
- Built: 1905
- Architect: James Nave
- Architectural style: Colonial Revival
- NRHP reference No.: 94001364
- Added to NRHP: November 25, 1994

The Agnes M. Tamblyn House, at 1506 Seventeenth Ave., Lewiston, Idaho, was designed by Lewiston architect James H. Nave. It was built in 1905. It was listed on the National Register of Historic Places in 1994.

It was one of nine homes of the Blanchard Heights development, which were originally surrounded by open fields, but these were filled in by post-World War II houses.

Its National Register nomination describes it as "an example of the Colonial Revival style. Its complex massing and the variation of its wall planes combined with classical details are characteristic of a subtype of this style sometimes referred to as "free classic." Despite the later development of the neighborhood, "The mature landscaping and imposing scale, however, convey a sense of its original rural setting. The house is situated on a steep hill facing north, and has a view of Lewiston, the Clearwater River and valley."

It has also been known as the Glen W. Todd house.
