= James Asposas House =

- James Aspoas House
- U.S. National Register of Historic Places
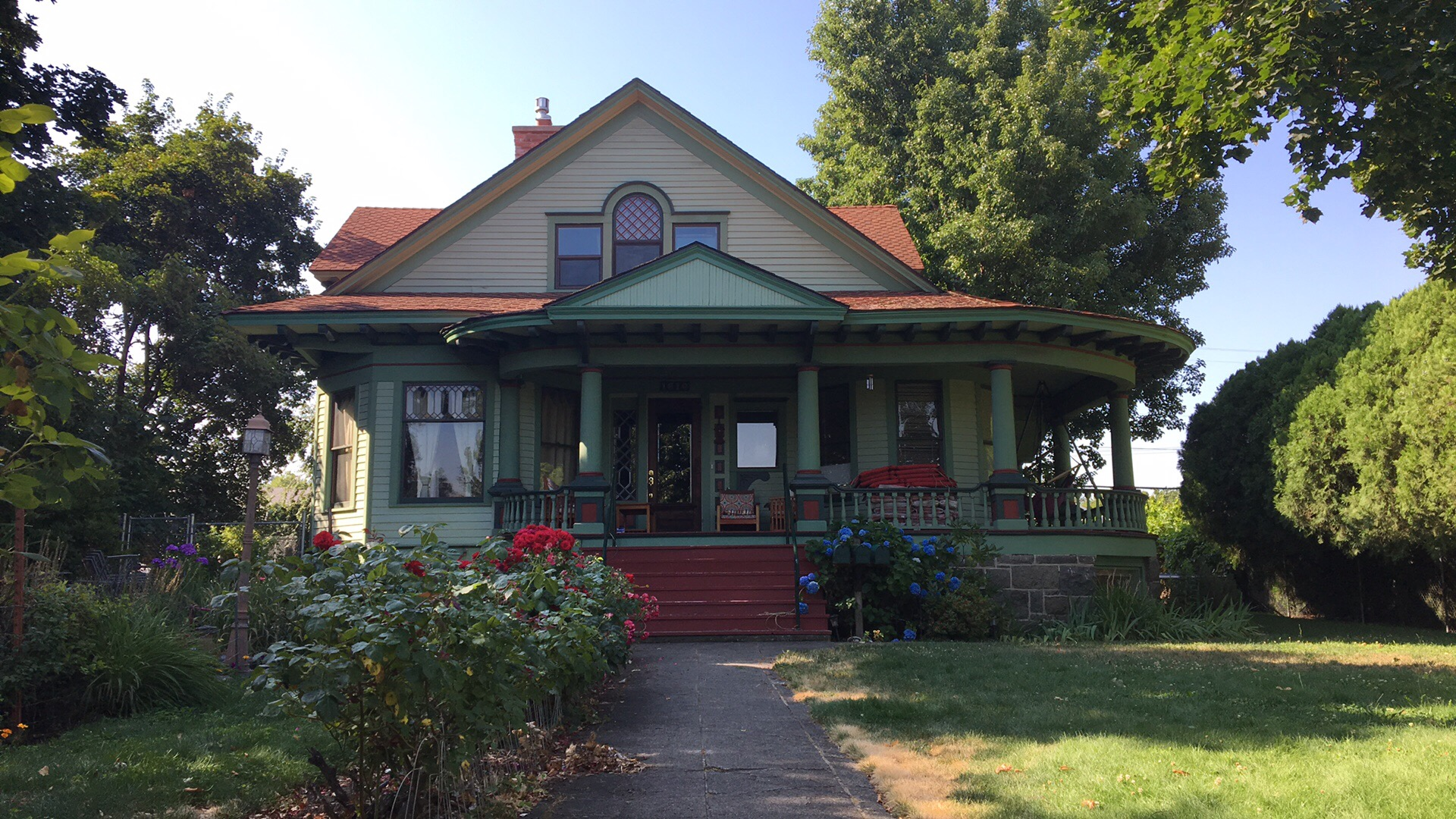

- Location within Idaho
- Location: 1610 Fifteenth Ave., Lewiston, Idaho
- Coordinates: 46°24′17″N 117°00′32″W
- Area: less than one acre
- Built: 1904
- Architect: James Nave
- Architectural style: Colonial Revival
- NRHP reference No.: 94001366
- Added to NRHP: November 25, 1994

The James Aspoas House, at 1610 Fifteenth Ave. in Lewiston, Idaho, was designed by architect James H. Nave and was built in 1904. It was listed on the National Register of Historic Places in 1994.

It is one of nine houses built in 1904–07 in the Blanchard Heights development, on a hill overlooking Lewiston to the north. It is one of three of the houses located contiguously, and is almost identical to the William and Elizabeth McLaren House at 1622 Fifteenth Avenue, which was listed in the National Register in 1992.

It was designed by Nave in "free classic" variant of Colonial Revival style. It is a mostly symmetrical two-story clapboarded house upon a coursed stone foundation.
