= William and Elizabeth McLaren House =

- U.S. National Register of Historic Places
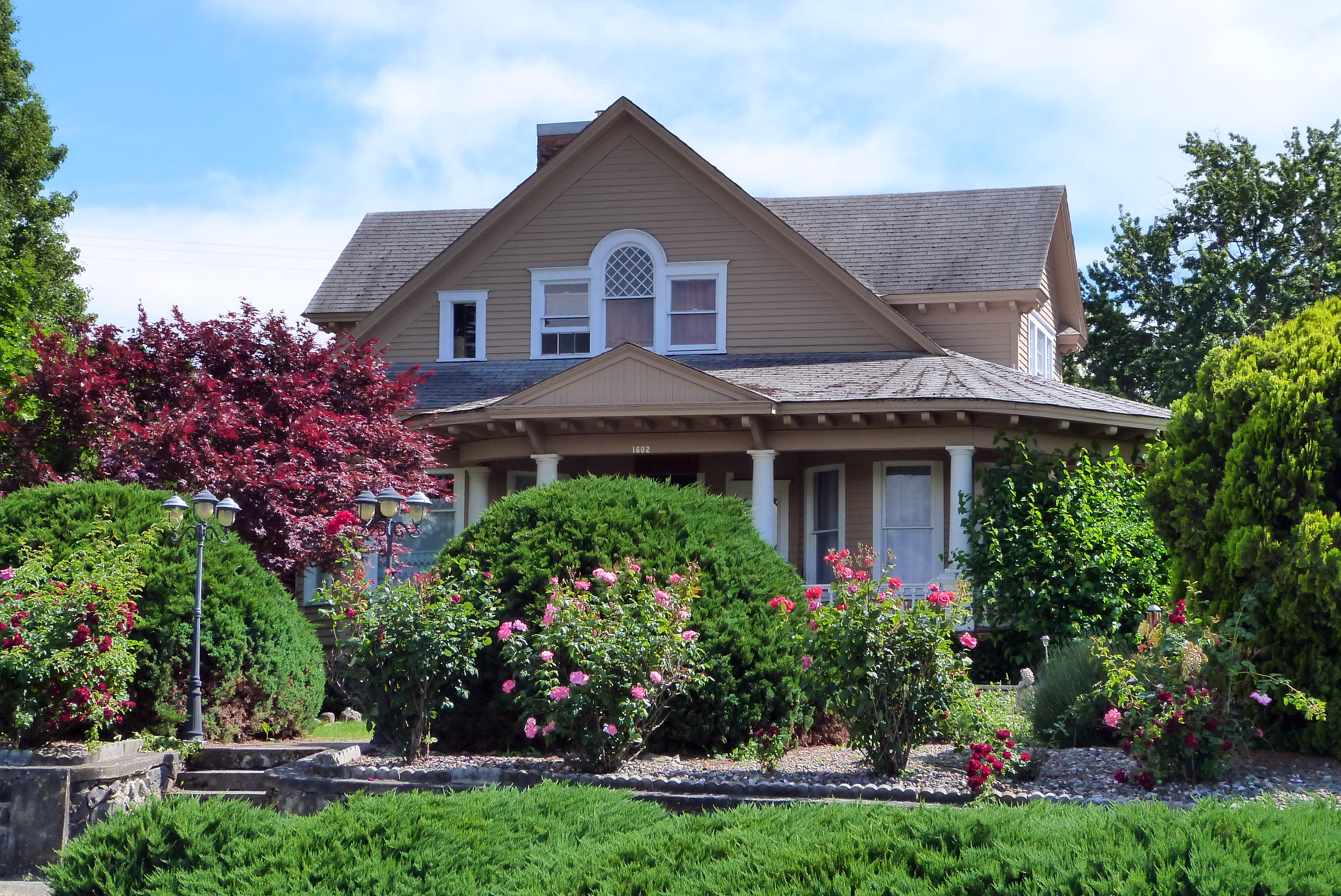

- Location within Idaho Location within the United States
- Location: 1602 15th Ave., Lewiston, Idaho
- Coordinates: 46°24′17″N 117°00′33″W
- Area: less than one acre
- Built: 1904
- Architect: James Nave
- Architectural style: Colonial Revival
- NRHP reference No.: 92001413
- Added to NRHP: November 6, 1992

The William and Elizabeth McLaren House, at 1602 15th Ave. in Lewiston, Idaho, was built in 1904. It was designed by Lewiston architect James Nave. It was listed on the National Register of Historic Places in 1992.

It is Colonial Revival in style.

The similar James Asposas House, at 1610 Fifteenth Ave., was listed on the National Register in 1994.
