= Nave Apartments =

- U.S. National Register of Historic Places
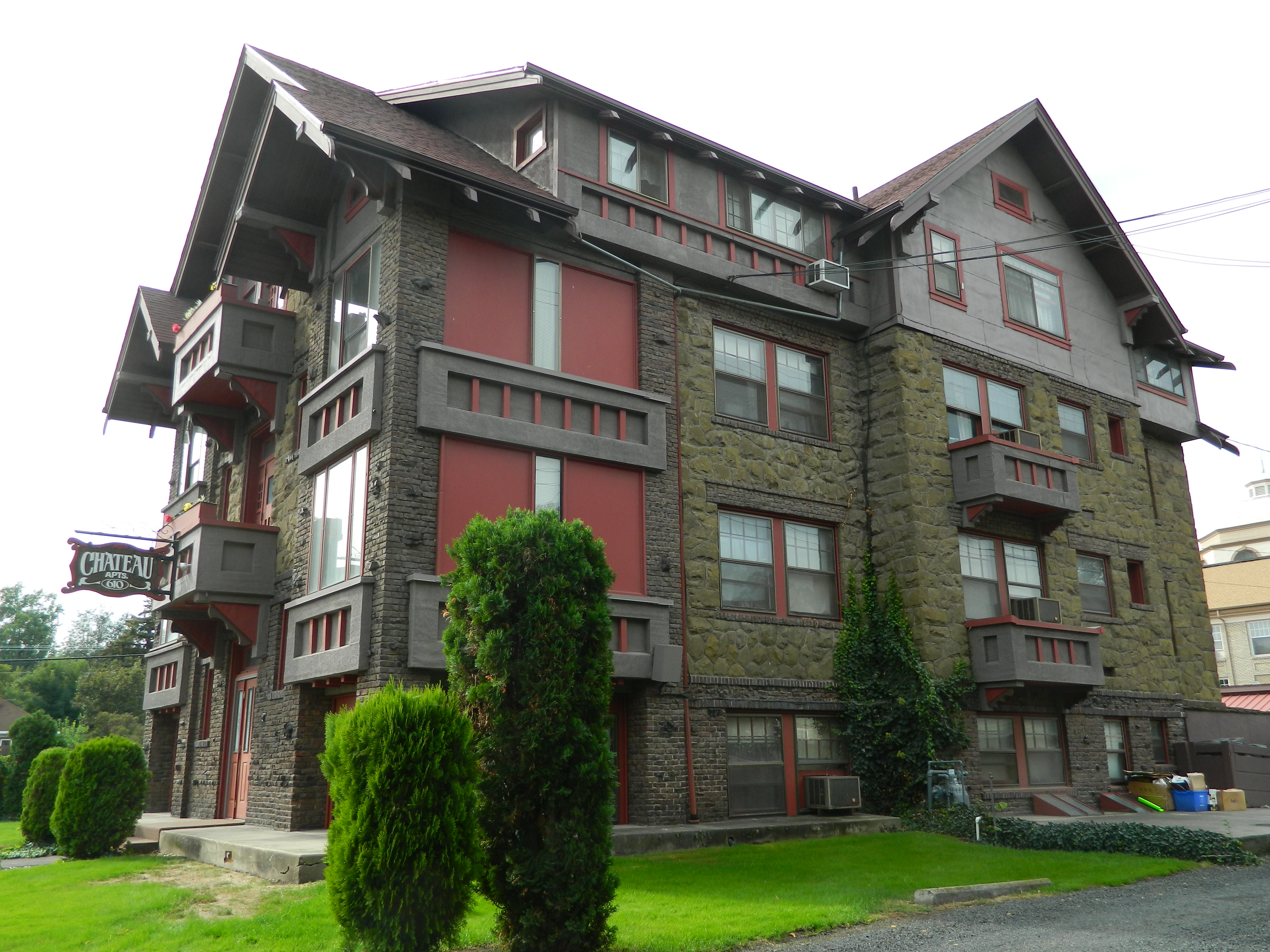

- Location within Idaho Location within the United States
- Location: 600 block of 8th St., Lewiston, Idaho
- Coordinates: 46°24′50″N 117°01′19″W
- Area: less than one acre
- Built: 1913
- Architect: James H. Nave
- Architectural style: Swiss Chalet/Swiss Chalet Revival
- NRHP reference No.: 78001085
- Added to NRHP: August 3, 1978

The Nave Apartments, located on the 600 block of 8th St. in Lewiston, Idaho, were built in 1913. The building was listed on the National Register of Historic Places in 1978.

It was designed by architect James H. Nave with Swiss Chalet/Swiss Chalet Revival styling, with Nave possibly influenced by Spokane, Washington architect K.K. Cutter. It has also been known as Wilson Apartments.

It is a three-story 80 by 120 feet (24 m × 37 m) stone and brick building, built with dark brown sandstone from the architect's quarry, named Swallow's Nest.
