= Edwin Robert Booth House =

Historic house in Nephi, Utah

- U.S. National Register of Historic Places
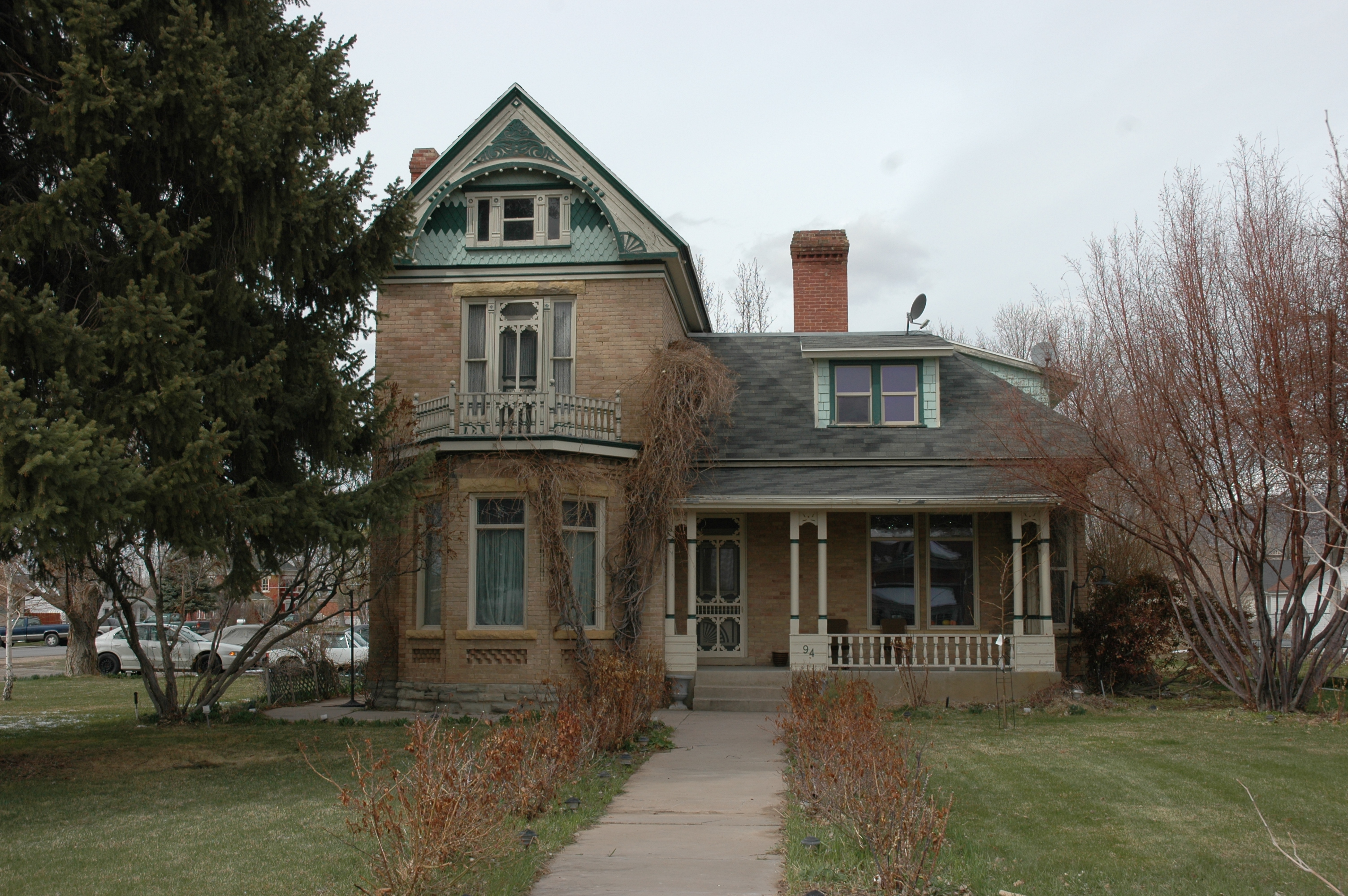
- The house in 2010

- Location within Utah Location within the United States
- Location: 94 W. 300 South, Nephi, Utah
- Coordinates: 39°42′15″N 111°50′13″W
- Area: less than one acre
- Built: 1893
- Architectural style: Late Victorian
- NRHP reference No.: 79002497
- Added to NRHP: December 6, 1979

The Edwin Robert Booth House is a two-story Late Victorian residence located at 94 W. 300 South in Nephi, Utah. Built in 1893, it was listed on the National Register of Historic Places on December 6, 1979.

== Architecture and significance ==
The 1979 National Register nomination described the house's significance as follows:

The significance of the Booth House lies in the merit of the architecture. The refined Victorian elegance of this home speaks eloquently of the bourgeois values of the rural entrepreneurial class and the effort they put into making their homes reflect their distance from the less successful participants in the frontier settlement experience.

Edwin Robert Booth Jr. (1857–1914) was the Nephi City Recorder when he married Anna Elizabeth Brough (1860–1931) and built this home. He had been a councilman in Nephi's first city government (1889). In 1899 he was elected mayor of Nephi. During the years following his term of office, he served as the postmaster. Booth's business ventures included executive involvement with the Utah Wool Growers Company and the Nephi National Bank.

This impressive Victorian house was built by a man influential in local politics. His wife was a member of one of the first non-Indian families in the area — her father John had been among those (as had Edwin's father, Edwin Sr.) who had built within the Salt Creek Fort, constructed beginning in 1854 as a defence against local Indians. Her brothers built homes in the area — James built the home directly south.

Because of Edwin's civic and business involvements, the Booths entertained extensively. The double parlour in the home was the setting for many parties and dinners, with nieces and nephews pitching in to help.

== Condition and ownership ==
The house was in deteriorated condition at the time of its 1979 nomination. Following the death of a later owner, Odell Taylor, "the house was torn apart by relatives looking for money which he had supposedly hidden in the house. It remained unoccupied for many years." Renovations were planned by the owners at the time of the 1979 nomination.
