= St. Stanislaus Catholic Church (Lewiston, Idaho) =

- U.S. National Register of Historic Places
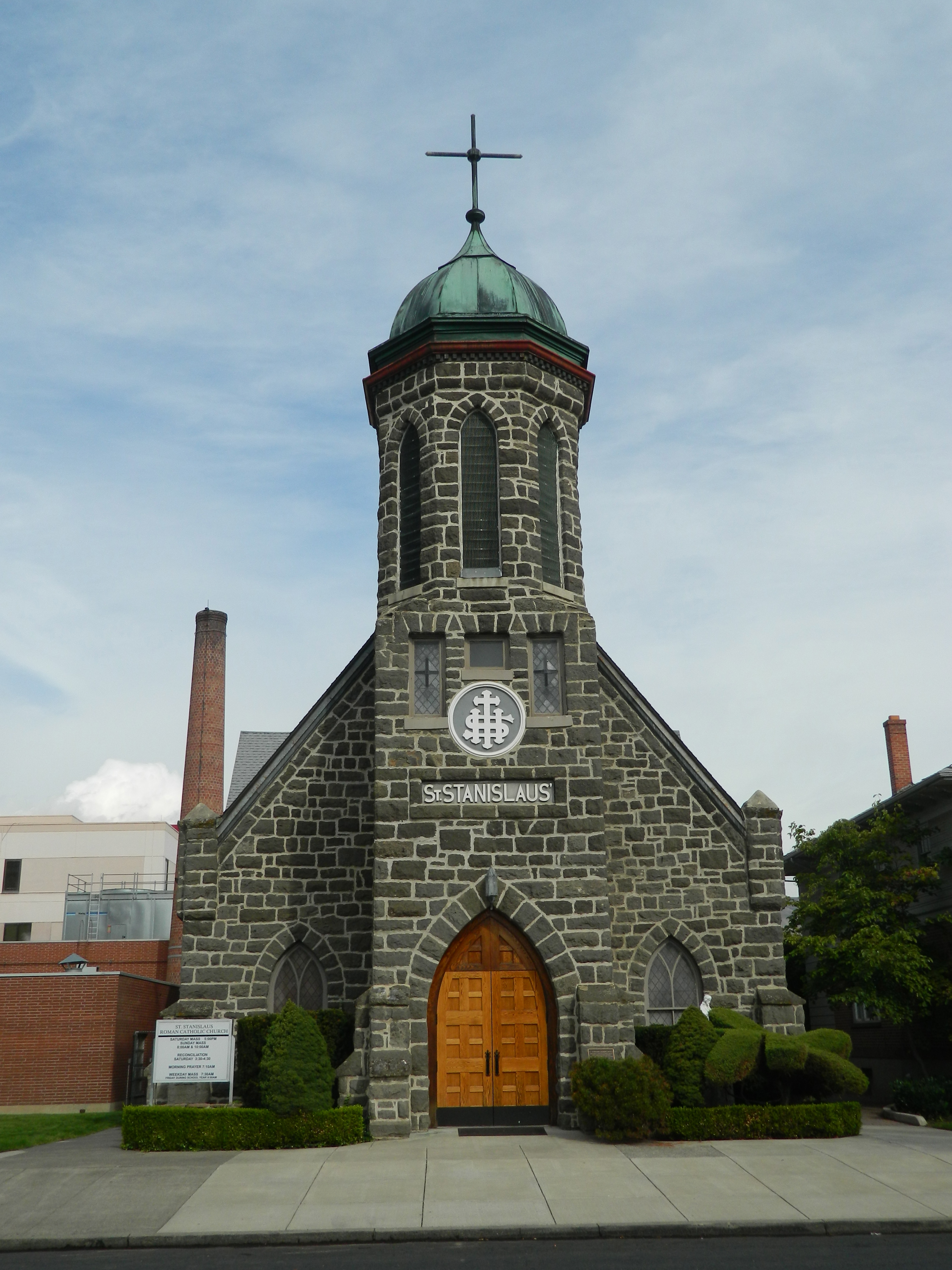

- Location within Idaho
- Location: 633 5th Ave., Lewiston, Idaho
- Coordinates: 46°24′57″N 117°01′26″W
- Area: less than one acre
- Built: 1905
- Built by: Dubray Bros.
- Architect: James H. Nave
- Architectural style: Gothic
- NRHP reference No.: 78001087
- Added to NRHP: February 7, 1978

The St. Stanislaus Catholic Church in Lewiston, Idaho is located at 633 Fifth Avenue. It was designed by Lewiston architect James H. Nave and was built by the Dubray Brothers in 1905. It was listed on the National Register of Historic Places in 1978.

It is Gothic Revival in style, built of local basalt rock, with a 48 feet (15 m) tall octagonal tower.
