= Kerr-Booth House =

Historic house in Arkansas, United States

- U.S. National Register of Historic Places
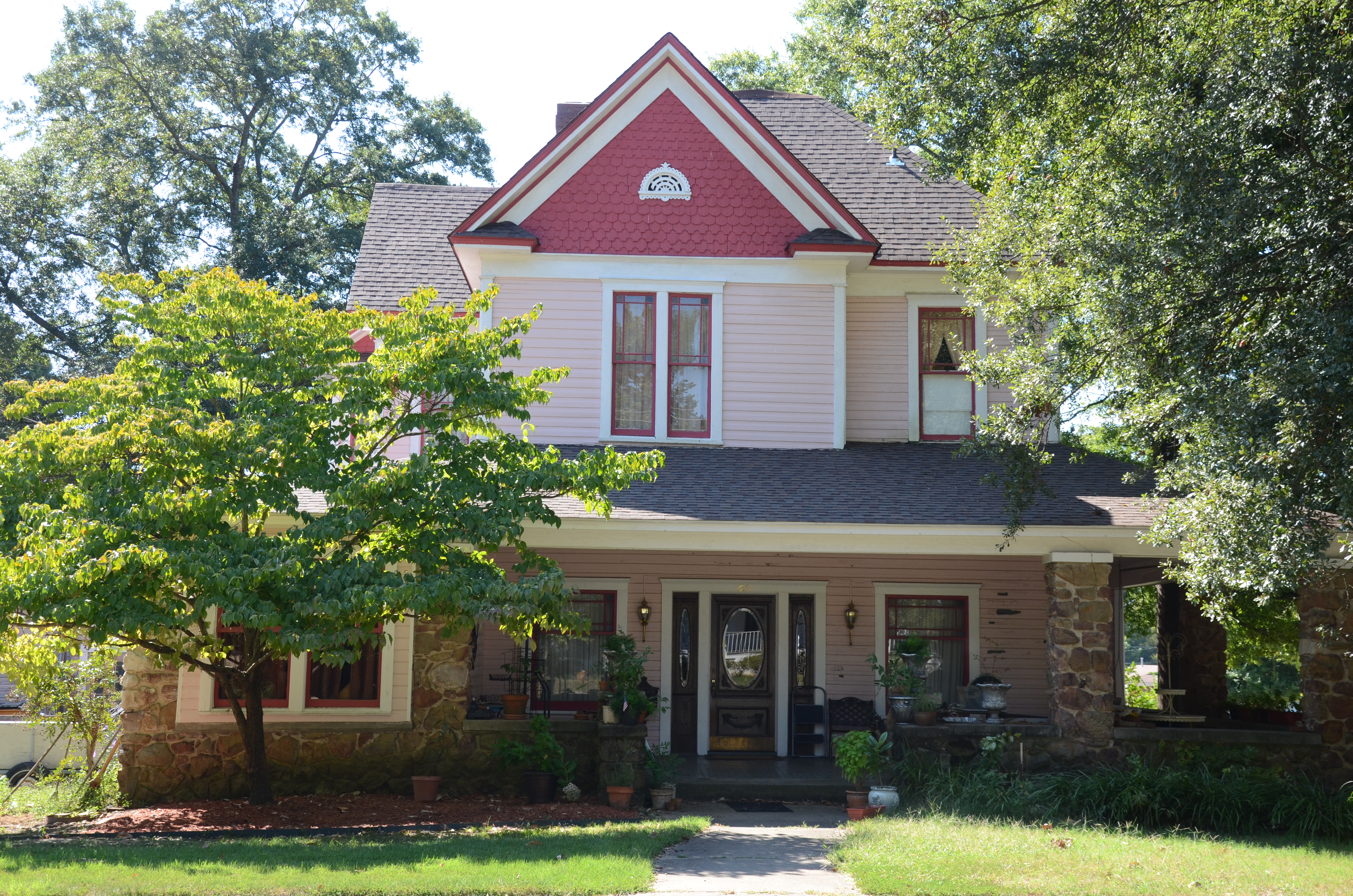

- Location within Arkansas Location within the United States
- Location: 611 W. Center Ave., Searcy, Arkansas
- Coordinates: 35°15′1″N 91°44′34″W
- Area: 1 acre (0.40 ha)
- Built: 1890
- Architect: Z.E. Kerr
- Architectural style: Queen Anne
- MPS: White County MPS
- NRHP reference No.: 06000076
- Added to NRHP: March 2, 2006

The Kerr-Booth House is a historic house at 611 West Center Avenue in Searcy, Arkansas. It is a two-story wood-frame structure, finished in wooden clapboards and decorative cut shingles. Its roof line is asymmetrical, with projecting gables and a recessed front porch supported by rusticated stone posts. The house was built in 1890 as a Queen Anne Victorian, and was later altered to add Craftsman elements; it is an locally distinctive blend of these styles.

The house was listed on the National Register of Historic Places in 2006.

== See also ==
- National Register of Historic Places listings in White County, Arkansas
