= Booth Cooperage =

- U.S. National Register of Historic Places
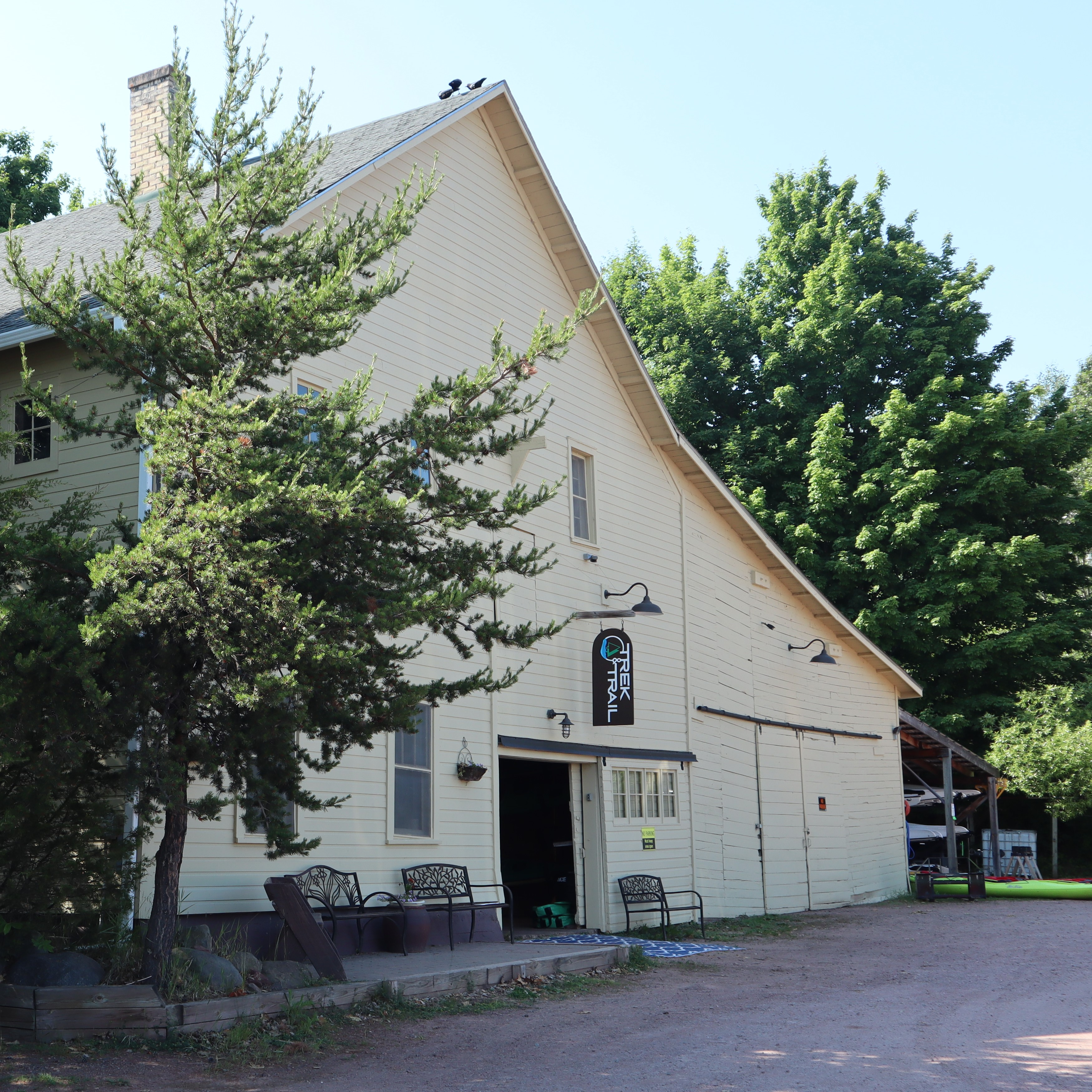
- Booth Cooperage
- Location: 1 East Washington St. Bayfield, Wisconsin
- Coordinates: 46.81256°N 90.81284°W
- NRHP reference No.: 76000049
- Added to NRHP: August 13, 1976

The Booth Cooperage is located in Bayfield, Wisconsin.

== History ==
The Booth Cooperage was one of several buildings that made up a fishery. Barrels for packing the fish were assembled within the building. More recently, the site has been used by a kayak outfitting business. It was listed on the National Register of Historic Places in 1976.
