= Green Booth House =

Historic house in Arkansas, United States

- U.S. National Register of Historic Places
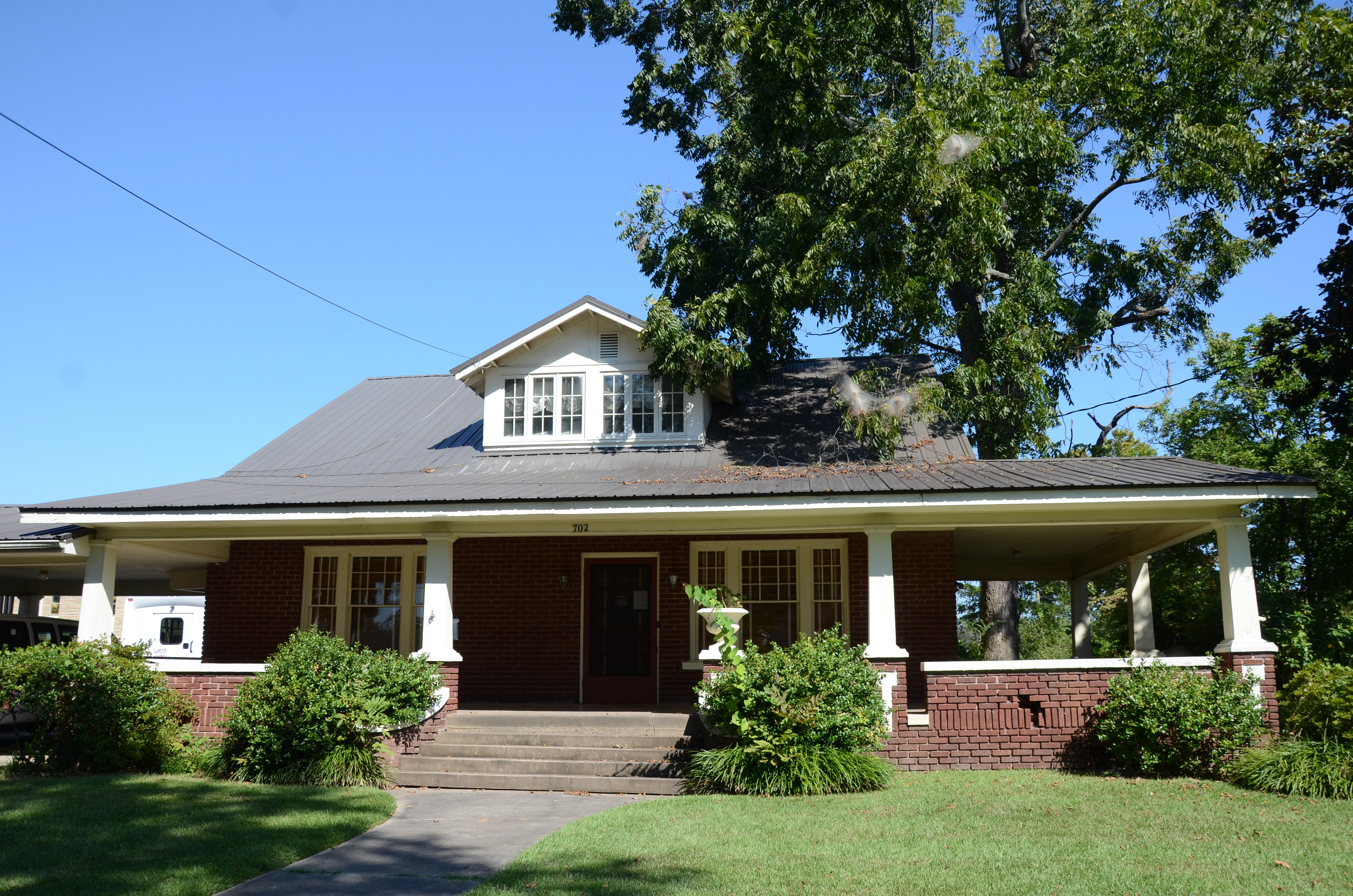

- Location within Arkansas Location within the United States
- Location: Jct. of S. Pecan St. and W. Center Ave., Searcy, Arkansas
- Coordinates: 35°14′56″N 91°44′39″W
- Area: less than one acre
- Built: 1925
- Architectural style: Bungalow/craftsman
- MPS: White County MPS
- NRHP reference No.: 91001202
- Added to NRHP: September 5, 1991

The Green Booth House is a historic house at South Pecan Street and West Center Avenue in Searcy, Arkansas. It is a single-story brick structure, with a broad gabled roof, and a wraparound front porch that extends to a carport on the left. A gabled dormer projects from the center of the front roof slope, and the porch is supported by tapered columns set on brick piers. Built c. 1925, the house is a fine example of the area's second phase of Craftsman architecture.

The house was listed on the National Register of Historic Places in 1991.

== See also ==
- National Register of Historic Places listings in White County, Arkansas
