= Clinger–Booth House =

Historic house in Utah, United States

- U.S. National Register of Historic Places
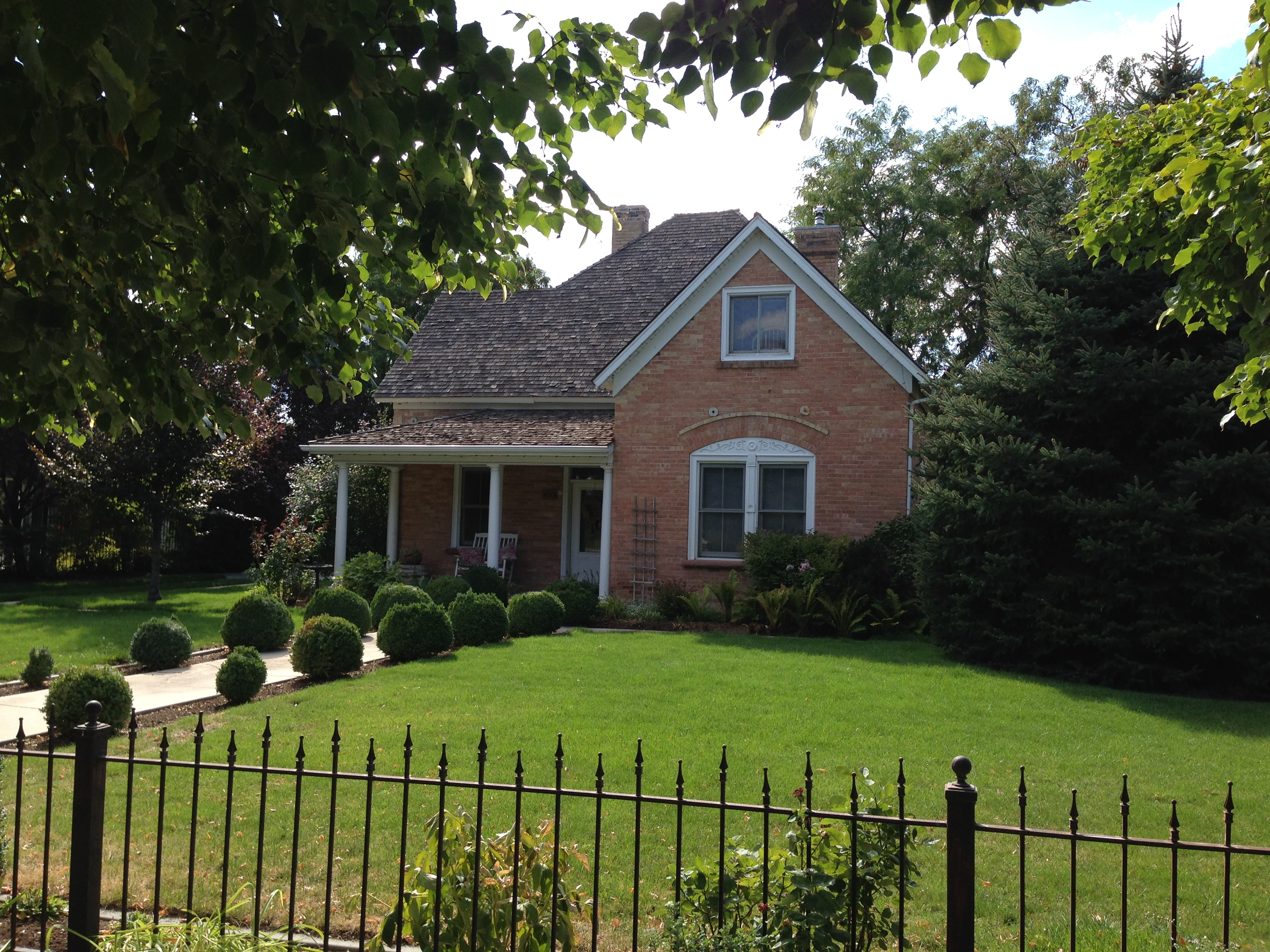

- Location within Utah Location within the United States
- Location: 468 South Main Street, Orem, Utah; United States
- Coordinates: 40°17′19″N 111°41′42″W
- Area: 2.8 acres (1.1 ha)
- Built: 1894
- Built by: Clinger, George
- Architectural style: Late Victorian
- MPS: Orem, Utah MPS
- NRHP reference No.: 98000660
- Added to NRHP: June 11, 1998

The Clinger–Booth House at 468 South Main Street in Orem, Utah, United States, was built c.1894. It was modified in 1935. It was listed on the National Register of Historic Places in 1998.

== See also ==
- National Register of Historic Places listings in Utah County, Utah
