= Grand Army of the Republic Hall (Grand Meadow, Minnesota) =

- Booth Post No. 130-Grand Army of the Republic Hall
- U.S. National Register of Historic Places
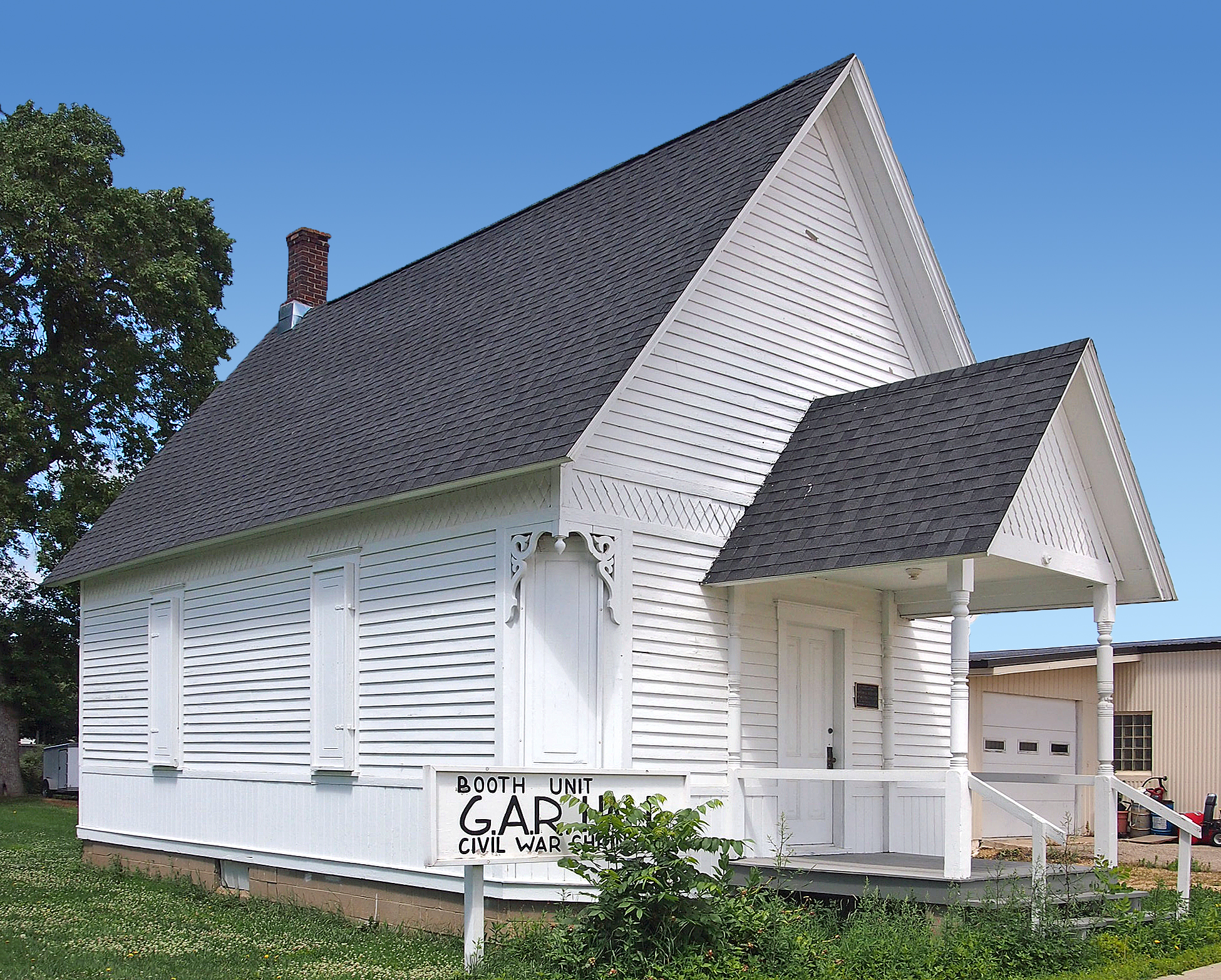
- The hall from the southeast

- Location within Minnesota Location within the United States
- Location: Grand Meadow, Minnesota
- Coordinates: 43°42′15.03″N 92°34′22.13″W
- Built: 1891
- NRHP reference No.: 86001278
- Added to NRHP: June 13, 1986

The Grand Army of the Republic Hall, also known as Booth Post No. 130, is an historic Carpenter Gothic building in Grand Meadow, Minnesota, United States. The hall was built in 1891 and on June 13, 1986, it was added to the National Register of Historic Places. It was nominated for being a rare surviving example of an inexpensive pattern clubhouse and one of Minnesota's only two remaining Grand Army of the Republic halls.

The hall was the meeting place of the Booth Post No. 130, which was one of 192 Grand Army of the Republic (G.A.R.) posts in Minnesota. The hall is now vacant.
