= John E. Booth House =

Historic house in Utah, United States

- U.S. National Register of Historic Places
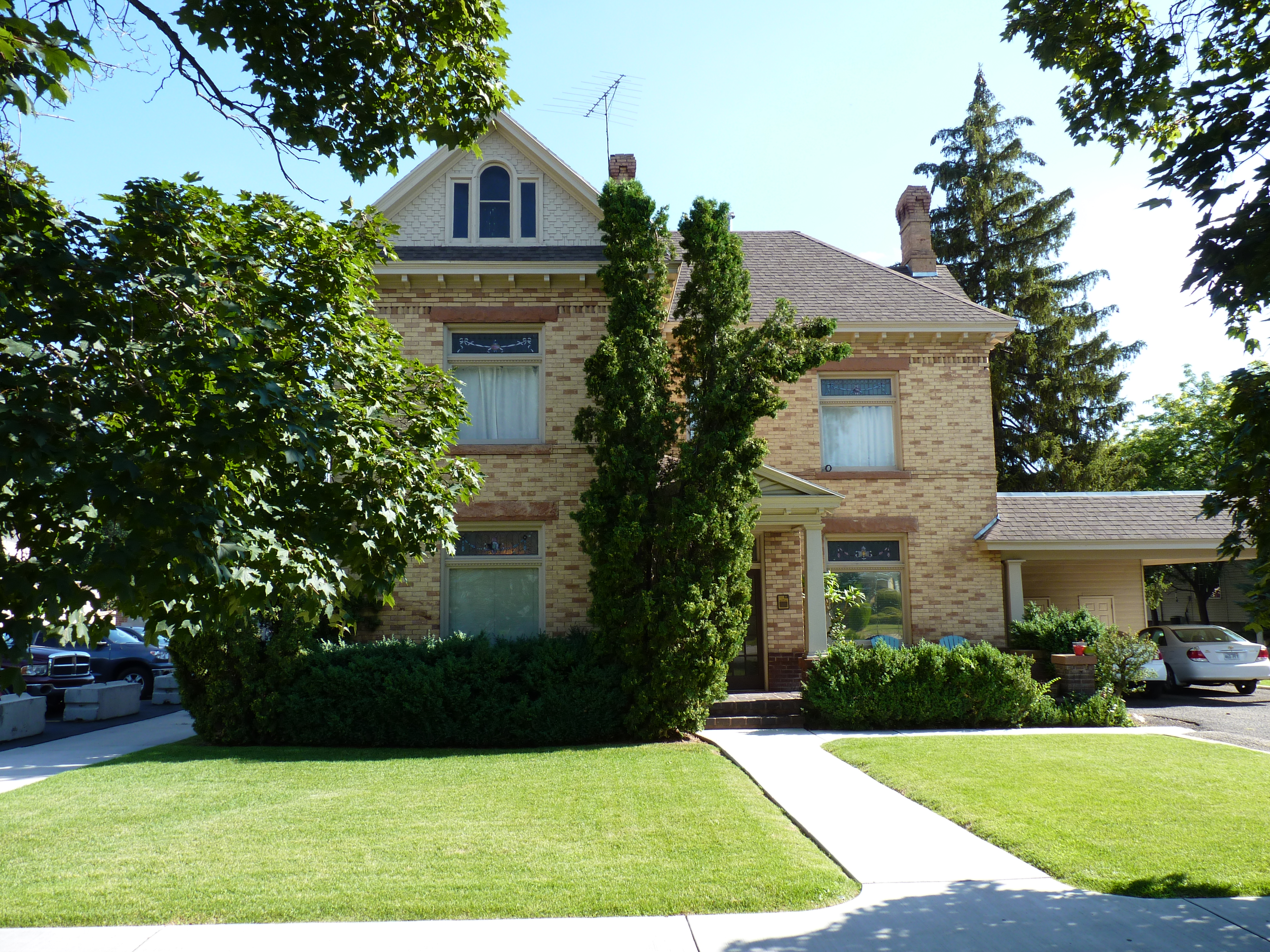
- John E. Booth House

- Location within Utah Location within the United States
- Interactive map showing the location of John E. Booth House
- Location: 59 West 500 North; Provo, Utah
- Coordinates: 40°14′25″N 111°39′32″W
- Area: less than one acre
- Built: 1900
- Architectural style: Victorian
- NRHP reference No.: 82004171
- Added to NRHP: February 11, 1982

The John E. Booth House is a historic house located in Provo, Utah. John E. Booth was a significant Provoan, and was extensively involved in Provo's community and religious affairs. Located at 59 West and 500 North and less than one acre in size, the John E. Booth House was built in 1900, and happens to be the only 2 1/2-story Victorian Mansion in Provo, Utah. This house is significant not only as a Victorian mansion, but because its "Bricks were individually painted to create a variegrated design effect" (Historic Provo p. 10). The house was added to the National Register of Historic Places in 1982. The house was designated to the Provo City Historic Landmark Register on May 26, 1995.

== Structure ==
The plan of this 2 1/2-story brick house derives from the vernacular L-plan and has a T extension in the rear. A hip roof and a gable roof section intersect to form the L. The extension has a hip roof. From each end of the hip roof are gable projections with pent roofs like the pent roof of the gable on the facade. Two tall chimneys with elaborate corbelling project from the hip roof section. Divisions between stories are subtly emphasized. Pairs of stringcourses divide the basement, first, second and third stories from one another. The division between the basement and first floor is further emphasized by color differentiation in the brick. The red brick of the basement was left unpainted, whereas the brick and mortar joints of the rest of the house except that on the T extension, have been painted various shades of brown and tan to create a variegated effect. The division between the second and third floors has a line of obliquely set bricks that runs beneath the stringcourses at the height of the second story lintels.

The fenestration of the facade is simple and carefully balanced. On the east half, the gable end, a simple Palladian window is centered on the top half story and a broad single sash window with a stained glass transom and stone lintel and lugsill is centered on each of the two lower stories. A single story square hip roof brick entrance chamber fills the angle of intersection of the hip and gable roof sections. Above it is a simple double hung sash window. On each story of the west half of the hip roof section is centered a single window similar to those on the gable end. Windows on the east, west and south sides of the building are long, narrow, have jigsaw cut detailing in the decorative arch above them, and are topped with a segmented reliving arch. Classical detailing includes: a boxed cornice on the main roofline and on that of the brick entry which is completely supported by brackets except on the T addition; the pediment over the entrance supported by a classical pier and pilaster which has a fan type of decoration on the tympanum; and dentils which line the lower edge of the transom of each single sash window. Major alterations include a change in the size of the opening of a window on the east wall and the addition of two frame extensions to the east and west sides of the T extension."

== John E. Booth ==
Born in England in 1847, John E. Booth emigrated to Utah with his parents in 1857 after his family converted to the Latter-day Saint (LDS) faith. He received his early education in England and later continued his studies in the United States, attending the University of Deseret while also teaching in various towns throughout Utah. Booth eventually pursued law under the mentorship of John B. Milner and began practicing in 1875—the same year he was appointed city attorney for Provo. In addition to his role as city attorney, he also served as a district judge.

Beyond his legal career, Booth was active in politics, serving in the Utah Territorial Senate from 1890 to 1891, as Mayor of Provo, and as president of the local school board. He was also a businessman, holding directorial positions in several companies and banks in Provo and leading the Utah Valley Iron Mining and Manufacturing Company.

A devoted member of his faith, Booth served in various roles within the LDS Church, including over 20 years as bishop of the Provo Fourth Ward. He practiced polygamy, marrying two wives in the early 1870s; however, both died about a decade later. He later remarried but had only one wife thereafter. Booth died in 1920, leaving his home to his widow. In 1923, she sold it to her daughter and son-in-law, Elsie and Isaac E. Brockbank. The house remains in the Brockbank family today.
