= Garfield School (Lewiston, Idaho) =

- U.S. National Register of Historic Places
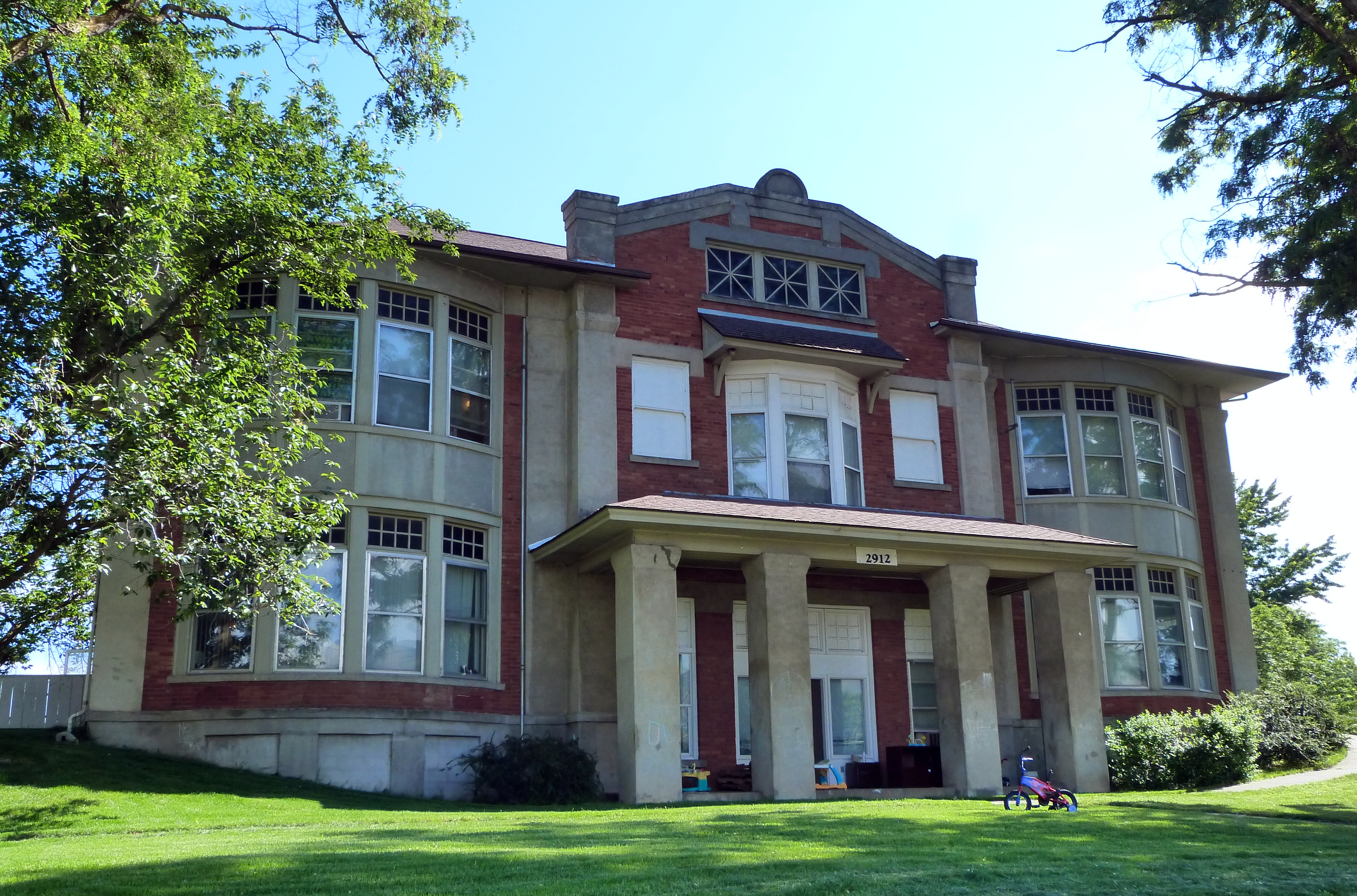

- Location within Idaho Location within the United States
- Location: 2912 5th Ave., Lewiston, Idaho
- Coordinates: 46°24′55″N 116°59′23″W
- Area: less than one acre
- Built: 1910
- Architect: J.H. Nave
- Architectural style: Colonial Revival
- NRHP reference No.: 82002513
- Added to NRHP: April 15, 1982

The Garfield School in Lewiston, Idaho, designed by J.H. Nave in Colonial Revival style and built in 1910, was listed on the National Register of Historic Places in 1982.

It is a two-story school built upon a raised basement. Its National Register nomination states: "It is distinguished by its use of two-story bowed bays on either side of a parapeted central bay. The red brick exterior is divided by massive, squared pilasters of grey stucco over brick that give the building a neoclassical character."
