= 21 Ranchhouse =

Historic house in Idaho, United States

- Twenty-One Ranchhouse
- U.S. National Register of Historic Places
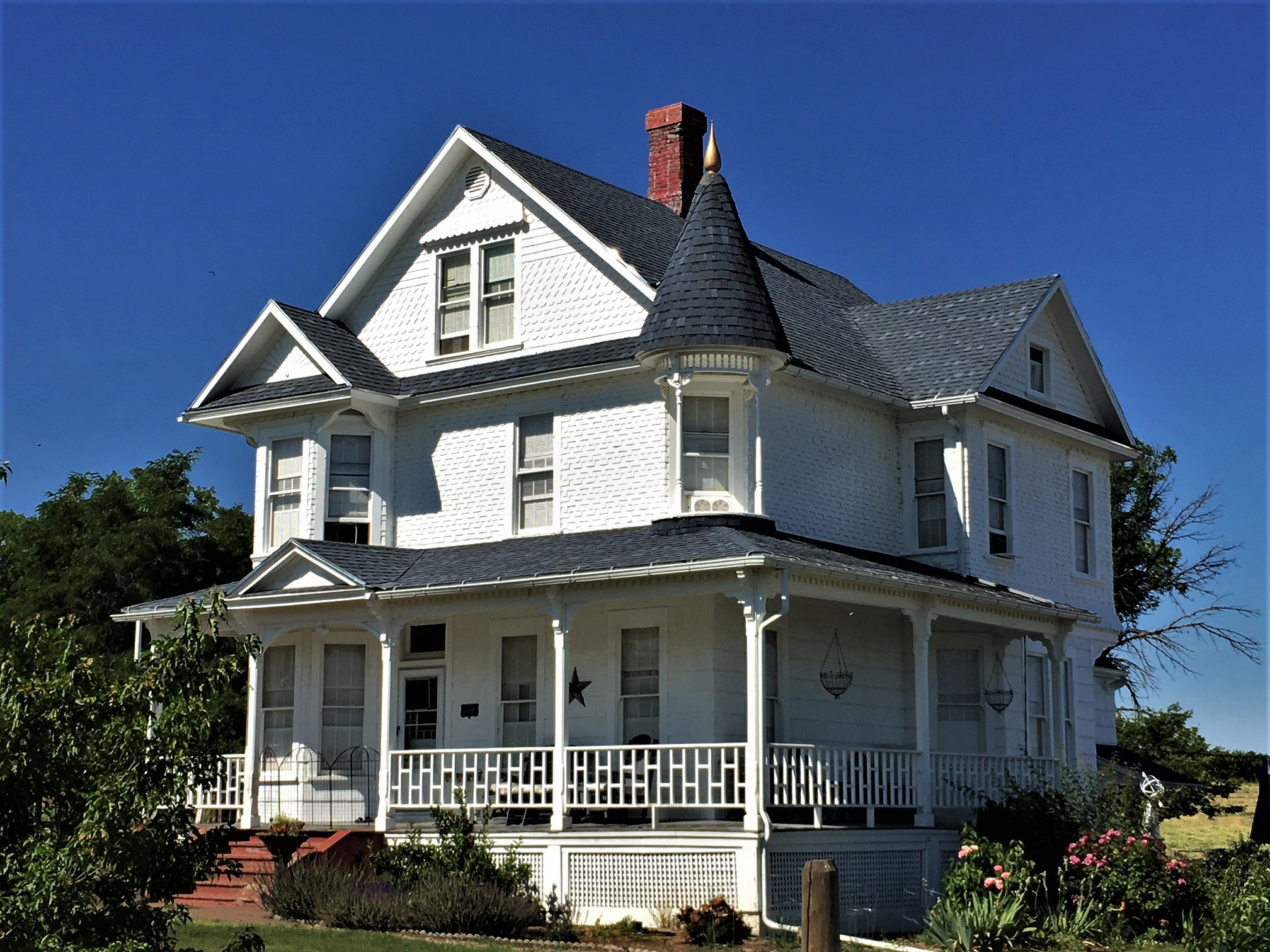

- Location within Idaho Location within the United States
- Location: 7570 Waha Rd. Lewiston, Idaho
- Coordinates: 46°13′27″N 116°51′29″W
- Area: less than one acre
- Built: 1886
- Architectural style: Queen Anne
- NRHP reference No.: 78001088
- Added to NRHP: December 18, 1978

21 Ranchhouse, located at 7570 Waha Road near Lewiston in Nez Perce County, Idaho, is a Queen Anne-style house built in 1886. It was listed on the National Register of Historic Places in 1978.

It is a 3-story house with a wraparound shed-roofed porch. A gambrel roofed frame barn built in 1921 is to the north.

The house is prominent, visible from several miles away, and is a local landmark.
