= Frank Booth House =

- U.S. National Register of Historic Places
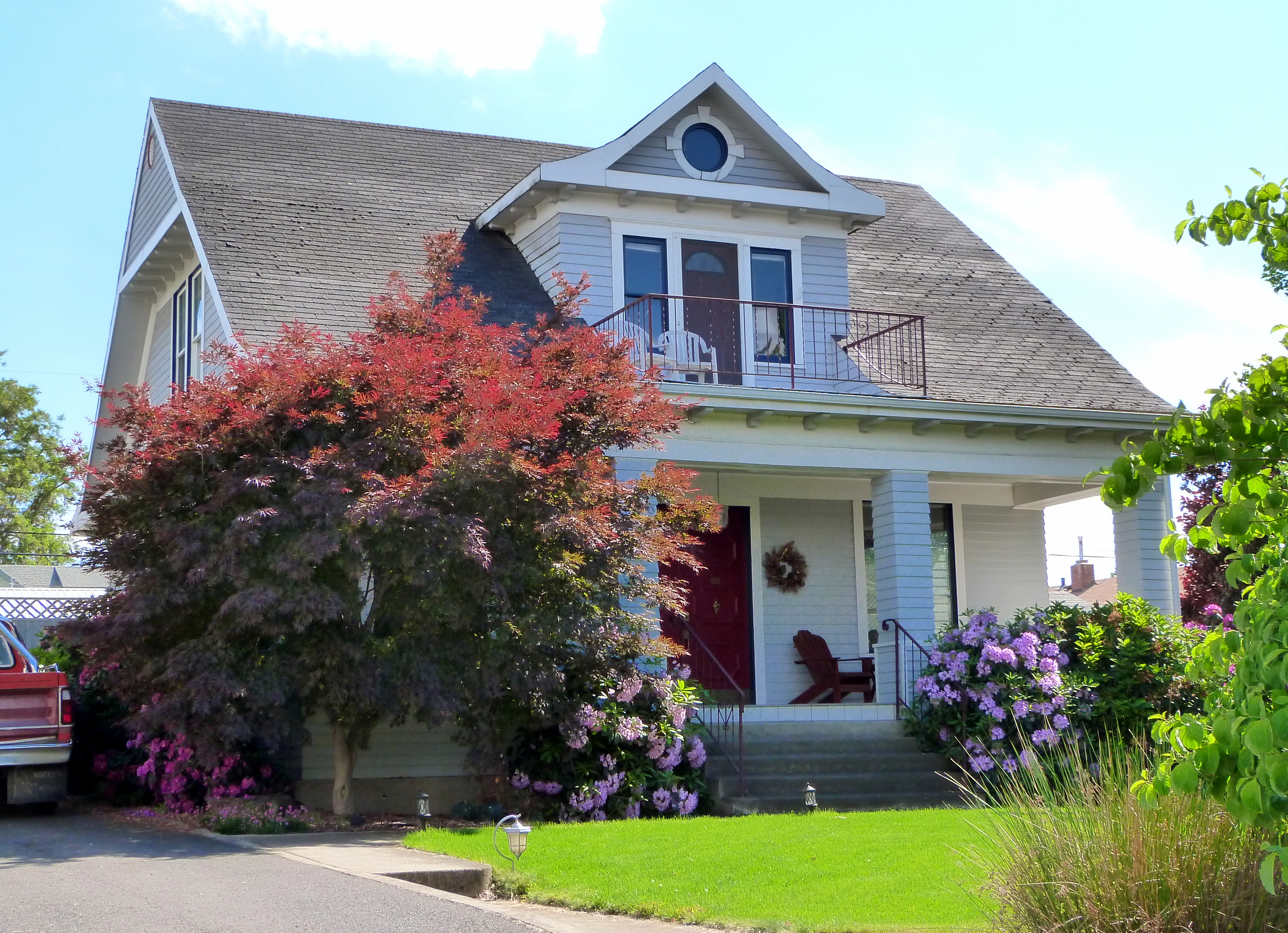

- Location within Idaho Location within the United States
- Location: 1608 Seventeenth Ave., Lewiston, Idaho
- Coordinates: 46°24′10″N 117°00′32″W
- Area: less than one acre
- Built: 1907
- Built by: Frank Booth
- Architect: James Nave
- Architectural style: Colonial Revival
- NRHP reference No.: 94001367
- Added to NRHP: November 25, 1994

The Frank Booth House, at 1608 Seventeenth Ave. in Lewiston, Idaho, was built in 1907. It was listed on the National Register of Historic Places in 1994.

It is a one-and-a-half-story Colonial Revival-style house, the last of nine houses to be built in the Blanchard Heights development. The development was originally surrounded by open fields, and the houses were scattered over a 16-block (then or later?) area which later was developed, post-World War II, as a suburb. The house is on a steep slope, facing north over Lewiston and the Clearwater River and its valley.

The house was designed by Lewiston architect James Nave, and it was built by Frank Booth, a local contractor.
