= Lapwai, Idaho =

- City
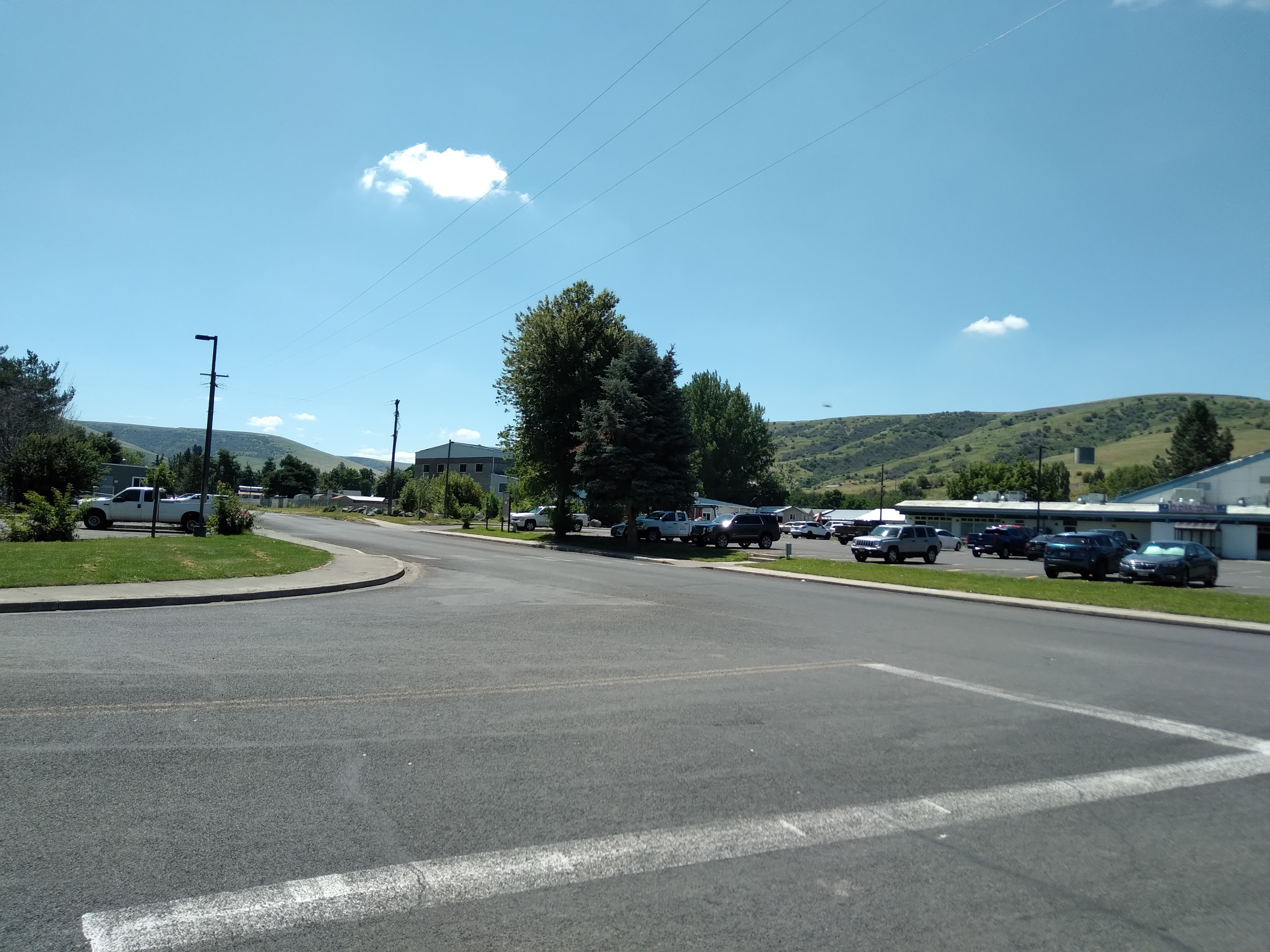
- Downtown Lapwai in early summer

- Location of Lapwai in Nez Perce County, Idaho.
- Coordinates: 46°24′16″N 116°48′16″W
- Country: United States
- State: Idaho
- County: Nez Perce

Area
  - Total: 0.76 sq mi (1.98 km^{2})
  - Land: 0.76 sq mi (1.96 km^{2})
  - Water: 0.012 sq mi (0.03 km^{2})
- Elevation: 955 ft (291 m)

Population (2020)
  - Total: 1,169
  - Estimate (2019): 1,137
  - Density: 1,503.6/sq mi (580.55/km^{2})
- Time zone: UTC-8 (Pacific (PST))
  - Summer (DST): UTC-7 (PDT)
- ZIP code: 83540
- Area codes: 208, 986
- FIPS code: 16-45370
- GNIS feature ID: 0396768
- Website: cityoflapwai.com

Lapwai (/ˈlæp.weɪ/ LAP-way) is a city in Nez Perce County, Idaho, United States. As of the 2020 census, Lapwai had a population of 1,169. It is the seat of government of the Nez Perce Indian Reservation.

== History ==
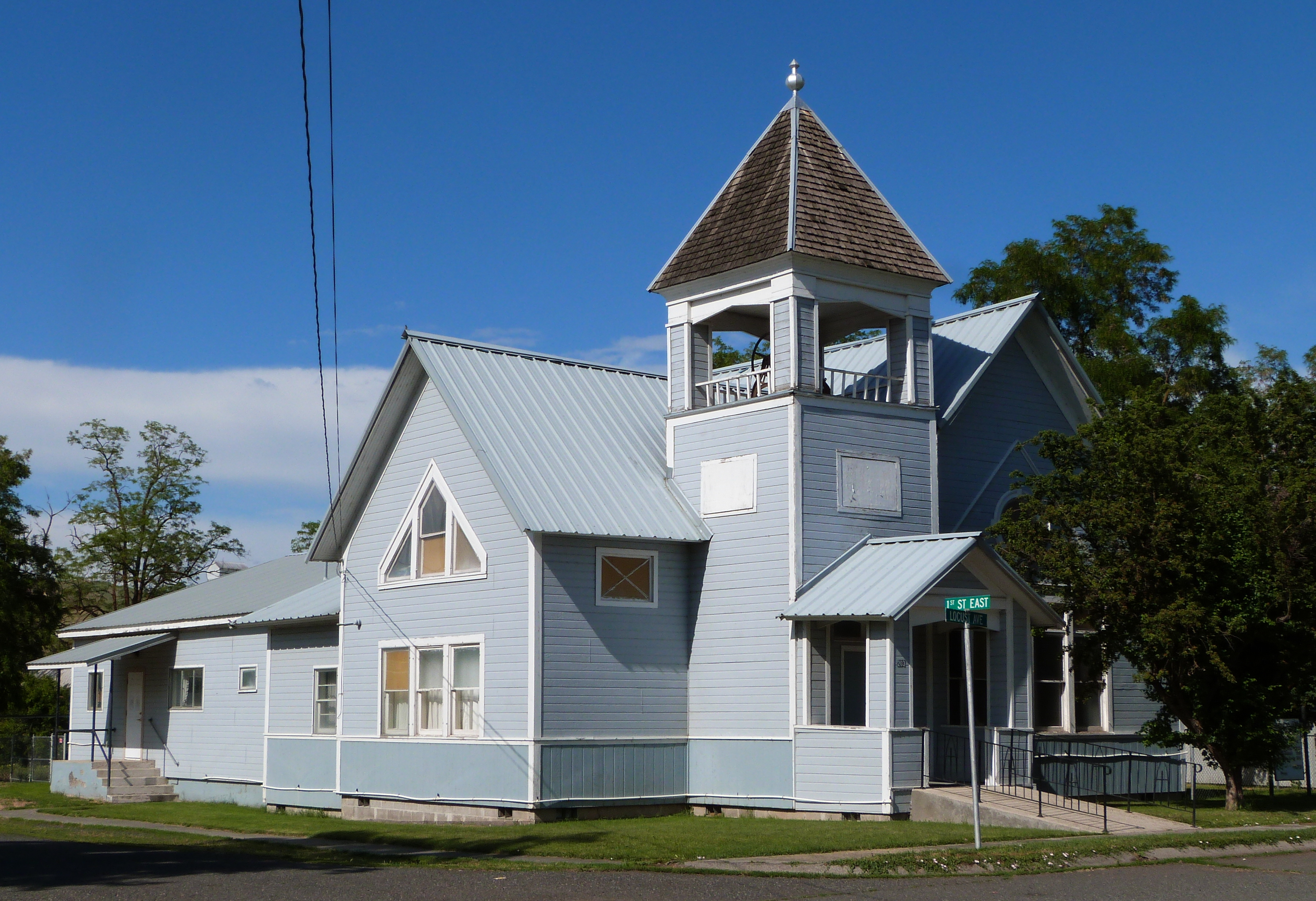
Historic First Presbyterian Church

The area that is today Lapwai was the home of Hin-ma-tute-ke-kaikt, also known as Big Thunder and later as James. It was here that Henry Spalding established a Protestant mission among the Nez Perce in 1836. This was also the general region that Bill Craig settled, since his wife was James' daughter.

The city's predecessor, Fort Lapwai, operated on the site from 1863 to 1884. The village of Lapwai was incorporated in 1911, with a model rural school.

The word "Lapwai" means place of the butterflies, as the area had thousands in early summer in earlier years.

Lapwai is part of the Lewiston, ID-WA Metropolitan Statistical Area.

== Geography ==
Lapwai is located at 46°24′16″N 116°48′16″W (46.404388, -116.804376)., at an elevation of 955 feet (291 m) above sea level

According to the United States Census Bureau, the city has a total area of 0.81 square miles (2.10 km^{2}), of which, 0.80 square miles (2.07 km^{2}) is land and 0.01 square miles (0.03 km^{2}) is water.

Lapwai is located on the floor of a valley carved by Lapwai Creek, roughly 3 miles south of its confluence with the Clearwater River. The hills to the east and west of the city rise dramatically more than 600 feet in less than a mile from the city. U.S. Route 95 passes through Lapwai.

== Transportation ==
=== Highway ===
- - US 95 - to Lewiston (north & west) and Grangeville (southeast)

=== Railroad ===
The city is served by the BG&CM Railroad, a freight carrier which operates on the former Second Subdivision line of the Camas Prairie Railroad.

== Education ==
The public schools in Lapwai are operated by Lapwai School District #341, led by Lapwai High School.

== Demographics ==
Historical population
Census	Pop.	Note	%±
1870	91		—
1880	165		81.3%
1920	359		—
1930	416		15.9%
1940	426		2.4%
1950	480		12.7%
1960	500		4.2%
1970	400		−20.0%
1980	1,043		160.8%
1990	932		−10.6%
2000	1,134		21.7%
2010	1,137		0.3%
2020	1,169		2.8%
U.S. Decennial Census

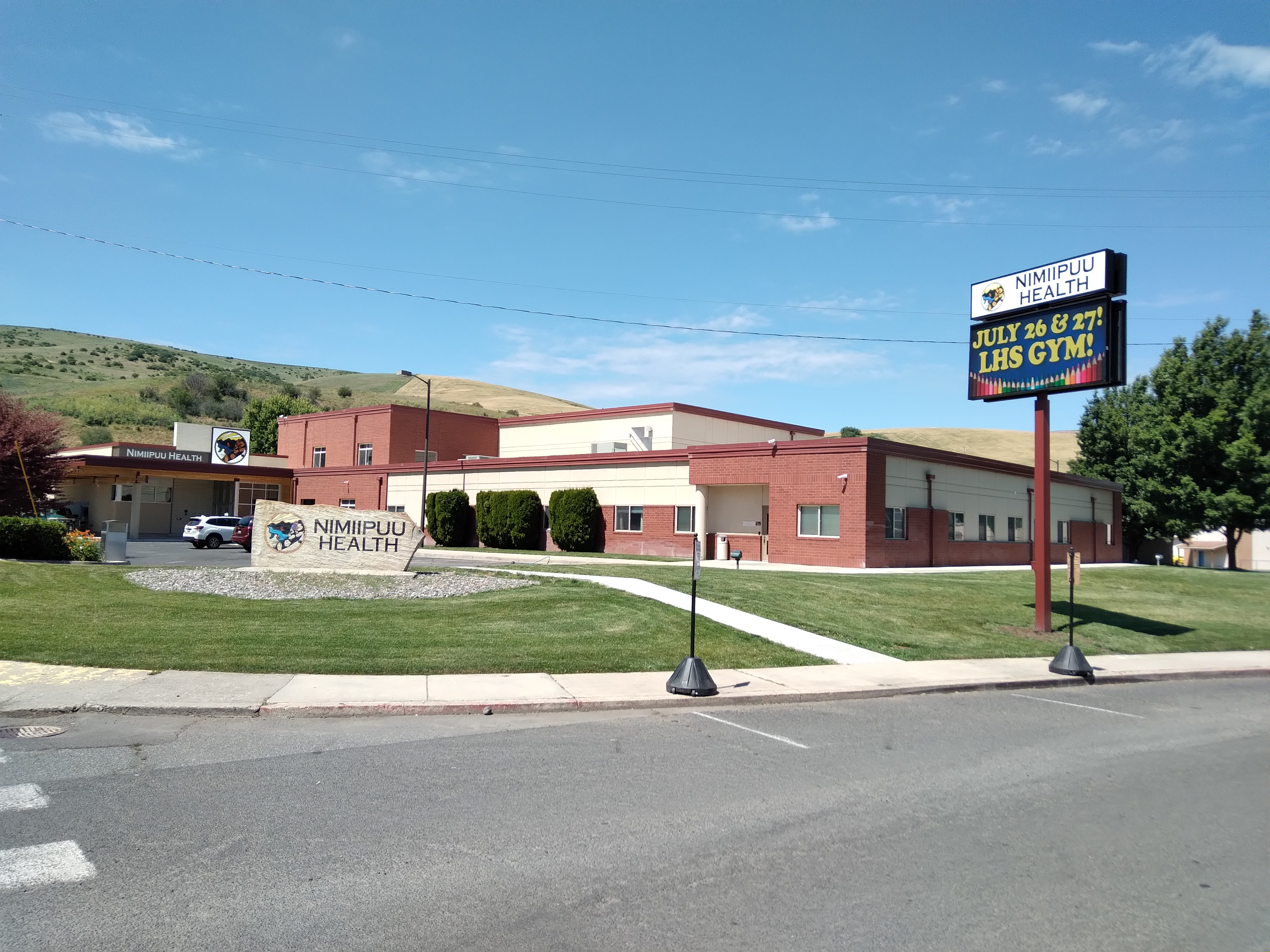
Nimiipuu Health Center

=== 2020 census ===
As of the 2020 census, Lapwai had a population of 1,169. The median age was 31.4 years. 29.9% of residents were under the age of 18 and 12.3% of residents were 65 years of age or older. For every 100 females there were 94.2 males, and for every 100 females age 18 and over there were 90.3 males age 18 and over.

There were 344 households in Lapwai, of which 48.8% had children under the age of 18 living in them. Of all households, 31.7% were married-couple households, 23.5% were households with a male householder and no spouse or partner present, and 35.5% were households with a female householder and no spouse or partner present. About 19.2% of all households were made up of individuals and 5.8% had someone living alone who was 65 years of age or older.

There were 375 housing units, of which 8.3% were vacant. The homeowner vacancy rate was 0.0% and the rental vacancy rate was 0.8%. 0.0% of residents lived in urban areas, while 100.0% lived in rural areas.

Racial composition as of the 2020 census
Race	Number	Percent
White	131	11.2%
Black or African American	9	0.8%
American Indian and Alaska Native	944	80.8%
Asian	1	0.1%
Native Hawaiian and Other Pacific Islander	0	0.0%
Some other race	9	0.8%
Two or more races	75	6.4%
Hispanic or Latino (of any race)	59	5.0%

=== 2010 census ===
As of the census of 2010, there were 1,137 people, 369 households, and 272 families living in the city. The population density was 1,421.3 inhabitants per square mile (548.8/km^{2}). There were 397 housing units at an average density of 496.3 per square mile (191.6/km^{2}). The racial makeup of the city was 16.6% White, 0.4% African American, 78.1% Native American, 0.1% Asian, 0.7% from other races, and 4.1% from two or more races. Hispanic or Latino of any race were 4.0% of the population.

There were 369 households, of which 46.9% had children under the age of 18 living with them, 35.2% were married couples living together, 26.8% had a female householder with no husband present, 11.7% had a male householder with no wife present, and 26.3% were non-families. 22.8% of all households were made up of individuals, and 8.7% had someone living alone who was 65 years of age or older. The average household size was 3.08 and the average family size was 3.58.

The median age in the city was 30.8 years. 31.4% of residents were under the age of 18; 10.9% were between the ages of 18 and 24; 23.9% were from 25 to 44; 24.6% were from 45 to 64; and 9.3% were 65 years of age or older. The gender makeup of the city was 48.7% male and 51.3% female.

=== 2000 census ===
At the 2000 census, there were 1,134 people, 339 households, and 270 families living in the city. The population density was 1,466.9 inhabitants per square mile (566.4/km^{2}). There were 364 housing units at an average density of 470.9 per square mile (181.8/km^{2}). The racial makeup of the city was 16.14% White, 0.53% African American, 81.39% Native American, 0.62% from other races, and 1.32% from two or more races. Hispanic or Latino of any race were 4.32% of the population.

There were 339 households, out of which 48.1% had children under the age of 18 living with them, 40.1% were married couples living together, 27.1% had a female householder with no husband present, and 20.1% were non-families. 17.1% of all households were made up of individuals, and 6.8% had someone living alone who was 65 years of age or older. The average household size was 3.35 and the average family size was 3.68.

In the city, the population was spread out, with 39.8% under the age of 18, 9.3% from 18 to 24, 26.6% from 25 to 44, 17.7% from 45 to 64, and 6.5% who were 65 years of age or older. The median age was 26 years. For every 100 females, there were 92.2 males. For every 100 females age 18 and over, there were 90.8 males.

The median income for a household in the city was $26,800, and the median income for a family was $30,417. Males had a median income of $31,382 versus $22,109 for females. The per capita income for the city was $10,159. About 20.5% of families and 23.7% of the population were below the poverty line, including 30.5% of those under age 18 and 10.2% of those age 65 or over.

== Notable residents ==
- Lillian Disney, wife of Walt Disney
- Chaske Spencer, played Sam Uley in the Twilight series

== See also ==
- List of cities in Idaho
- Fort Lapwai
- Nez Perce Horse
- Nez Perce people
- Nez Perce War
