= Booth =

Booth may refer to:

== People ==
- Booth (surname)
- Booth (given name)

== Fictional characters ==
- August Wayne Booth, from the television series Once Upon A Time
- Cliff Booth, a character in the 2019 film Once Upon a Time in Hollywood, played by Brad Pitt
- Frank Booth (Blue Velvet), villain of the 1986 film, played by Dennis Hopper
- Missy Booth, a character on the television series Ackley Bridge, played by Poppy Lee Friar
- Seeley Booth, a character on the television series Bones, played by David Boreanaz

== Places ==
=== Antarctica ===
- Mount Booth
- Booth Spur
- Booth Island

=== Canada ===
- Booth Island (Nunavut)

=== England ===
- Booth, East Riding of Yorkshire, a small village
- Booth Park, a cricket ground in Toft, Cheshire

=== United States ===
- Booth, Alabama, an unincorporated community
- Booth, Missouri, a ghost town
- Booth, Texas, an unincorporated community
- Booth Farm, Pennsylvania, on the National Register of Historic Places
- Booth Homestead, Ohio, on the National Register of Historic Places
- Booth State Scenic Corridor, a state park in Oregon

=== Outer space ===
- 13825 Booth, an asteroid

== Schools ==
- Booth School of Business, University of Chicago
- Booth University College, Winnipeg, Canada

== Buildings ==
- Booth House (disambiguation), several buildings
- Booth Mansion, Chester, Cheshire, England
- Booth Theatre, Manhattan, New York City, named for actor Edwin Booth
- Booth Theater (Independence, Kansas)
- Booth Library, Eastern Illinois University
- Booth Memorial Hospital, several hospitals

== In business ==
- Booths, UK supermarket chain
- Booth Newspapers, a newspaper publishing company
- Booth's Gin
- C F Booth (English scrap metal and recycling business)

== Other uses ==
- Booth (novel), 2022 novel by Karen Joy Fowler
- Booth baronets, three baronetcies
- Booth Museum of Natural History, Brighton and Hove, England
- Booth Western Art Museum, Cartersville, Georgia, United States
- USS Booth (DE-170), a United States Navy destroyer escort which served in World War II
- Booth, a play by Austin Pendleton
- A synonym for market stall
- The Booth, a 2005 Japanese horror film

== See also ==
- Boothe, a list of people with the surname
- Boothe Lake, Yosemite National Park, California, United States
- Boothe Memorial Park and Museum, Stratford, Connecticut, United States
- Isolation booth, a device used to prevent a person or people from seeing or hearing certain events
- Photo booth, a vending machine or kiosk which contains an automated camera and film processor
- Voting booth, in which voters cast their ballots in secrecy
- Telephone booth, a small structure furnished with a payphone
- Box office or ticket booth, a place where admission tickets are sold
- Tollbooth, a place on a toll road where an authority collects a fee for use
- Food booth, a structure from which food is sold
- Control booth, the area of the theater designated for the operation of technical equipment
- Armored booth, generally found outside of embassies and military installations
- Booth's multiplication algorithm, an algorithm invented by Andrew D. Booth
- Pink booth, structures in India where women can seek services
