= Booth (surname) =

Booth is a surname of northern English and Scottish origin, but arguably of pre 7th century Norse-Viking origins. It is or rather was, topographical, and described a person who lived in a small barn or bothy. Derived from the word "both", the word was used to denote various kinds of shelter, but especially a herdsman's dwelling on a summer pasture. The surname is most popular in Northern England, where early Scandinavian influence was marked, and to some extent in Scotland.

One of the most-recognised persons with the surname Booth is John Wilkes Booth, an American actor, better known for being the assassin of President Abraham Lincoln.

At the time of the British Census of 1881, its relative frequency was highest in Cheshire (4.2 times the British average), followed by Derbyshire, Yorkshire, Lancashire, Nottinghamshire, Aberdeenshire, Lincolnshire, Staffordshire and Westmorland. In all other British counties, its relative frequency was below national average.

== A ==
- Aaron Booth (born 1996), New Zealand decathlete
- Agnes Booth (1843–1910), Australian-born American actress, sister-in-law of Edwin and John Wilkes Booth
- Alan Booth (1946–1993), British travel writer
- Albert Booth (1928–2010), British politician
- Albert A. Booth (1850–1914), American pioneer and politician
- Albie Booth (1908–1959), American football player
- Alfred Allen Booth (1872–1948), British shipowner
- Andy Booth (born 1973), English retired footballer
- Andrew Donald Booth (1918–2009), British electrical engineer, physicist and computer scientist
- Annie Booth (born 1989), American jazz pianist
- Anthony Clarke Booth (1846–1899), English sergeant, recipient of the Victoria Cross
- Asia Booth Clarke (1835–1888), American poet, sister of Edwin and John Wilkes Booth

== B ==
- Ballington Booth (1857–1940), British-born American Christian minister, co-founder of Volunteers of America and Salvation Army officer
- Barton Booth (1681–1733), British actor
- Bill Booth, American skydiving engineer and inventor
- Brad Booth (born 1976), Canadian professional poker player
- Bramwell Booth (1856–1929), 2nd General of the Salvation Army
- Brett Booth, American comic book artist
- Brian Booth (1933–2023), Australian cricketer
- Brian Booth (cricketer, born 1935) (1935–2020), English cricketer

== C ==
- Calvin Booth (born 1976), American National Basketball Association assistant manager and former player
- Catherine Booth (1829–1890), co-founder of the Salvation Army with her husband William Booth
- Catherine Bramwell-Booth (1883–1987), Salvation Army officer née Catherine Booth, granddaughter of Catherine Booth (1829-1890)
- Charles Booth (social reformer) (1840–1916), English social reformer
- Charles G. Booth (1896–1949), British-born American writer of detective fiction and Academy Award winner
- Cherie Blair (born 1954), née Booth, wife of British Prime Minister Tony Blair
- Chris Booth (born 1948), New Zealand sculptor
- Christopher Booth (1924–2012), English clinician and historian
- Christopher Saint Booth (born 1960) British-Canadian filmmaker and musician known for the rediscovered song "Ulterior Motives"
- Claire Booth (born 1977), British physician and Countess of Ulster
- Colin Booth (mycologist) (1924–2003), English mycologist and phytopathologist
- Colin Booth (1934–2025), English footballer and winner of two League Championship medals
- Connie Booth (born 1940), American writer, actress and psychotherapist, former wife of John Cleese

== D ==
- Dave Booth (born 1948), English football coach and player
- David Booth (ice hockey) (born 1984), American National Hockey League player
- David G. Booth (born 1946), co-founder and CEO of Dimensional Fund Advisors
- Davon Booth (born 2002), American football player
- Dennis Booth (born 1949), British footballer, manager and coach
- Douglas Booth (born 1992), British actor
- Douglas Allen Booth (born 1949), Anglo-American television producer, writer and cartoonist who co-wrote Scooby Doo

== E ==
- Edwin Booth (1833–1893), American actor, brother of John Wilkes Booth
- Edwin Henry Booth (1828–1899), English founder of Booths supermarkets
- Edwin J. Booth (born 1955), English businessman, chair of Booths, great-great-grandson of Edwin H.
- Edwina Booth (1904–1991), American actress born Josephine Woodruff
- Emily Booth (born 1976), British actress and TV presenter
- Emma Scarr Booth (1835–1927), British-born American novelist, poet
- Emma Booth-Tucker (1860–1903), Salvation Army officer, 4th child of William and Catherine Booth
- Eric Booth Jr., baseball player
- Ernest Granville Booth (1898–1959), American criminal and screenwriter
- Ernie Booth (1876–1935), New Zealand rugby union player and coach
- Eugene T. Booth (1912–2004), American nuclear physicist
- Evangeline Booth (1865–1950), 4th General of the Salvation Army, 7th child of William and Catherine Booth
- Evelyn Booth (1897–1988), Irish botanist

== F ==
- Felix Booth (1775–1850), British gin distiller and promoter of Arctic exploration
- Franklin Booth (1874–1948), American artist and illustrator
- Frederick Booth (1890–1960), Rhodesian recipient of the Victoria Cross

== G ==
- Gemma Booth (born 1974), English photographer
- George Booth (cartoonist) (1926–2022), American New Yorker cartoonist
- George Booth, 1st Baron Delamer (1622–1684), English peer
- George Booth, 2nd Earl of Warrington (1675–1758), English landowner and silver collector
- George Gough Booth (1864–1949), American publisher and philanthropist
- George Hoy Booth, birth name of George Formby (1904–1961), English actor, singer-songwriter and comedian
- Graham Booth (1940–2011), British politician

== H ==
- Hartley Booth (born 1946), British politician
- Heather Booth (born 1945), American civil rights activist, feminist, and political strategist
- Henry Booth, 1st Earl of Warrington (1651–1694), supporter of William of Orange, Privy Councillor, Mayor of Chester and author
- Henry Booth (1788–1869), British businessman, engineer and railway proponent
- Herbert Booth (1862–1926), third son of William and Catherine Booth
- Herbert Booth (trade unionist) (died 1977 or 1978), British trade unionist
- Hester Santlow (c. 1690–1773), married name Hester Booth, English dancer and actress
- Hope Booth (1878−1933), Canadian-born vaudeville, burlesque, and theatre actress
- Hubert Cecil Booth (1871–1955), English engineer and inventor of the vacuum cleaner

== J ==
- James Booth (1927–2005), English actor
- James Lawler Booth, birth name of George Formby Sr (1875–1921), English actor, singer and comedian
- Jerome Booth (born 1963), British economist, author and investor
- Joe Booth (1871–1931), English footballer
- John Booth (disambiguation)
- John Rudolphus Booth (1827–1925), Canadian lumber king and railroad baron
- Joseph Booth (missionary) (1851–1932), British Baptist missionary in Africa
- Joseph Booth (rugby union) (1873–1958), Wales international rugby player
- Joseph Booth (bishop) (1886–1965), 7th Archbishop of Melbourne
- Josh Booth (rower) (born 1990), Australian rower at the 2012 Olympics
- Joshua Booth (c. 1758–1813), soldier and politician in Upper Canada
- Juini Booth (1948–2021), American jazz double-bassist
- Junius Brutus Booth (1796–1852), English stage actor, father of Edwin and John Wilkes Booth

== K ==
- Kate Booth (1858–1955), English Salvationist and evangelist, eldest daughter of William and Catherine Booth
- Katie Booth (scientist) (1907–2005), American biomedical chemist and civil rights activist
- Kathleen Booth (1922–2022), British pioneering computer scientist, created the first assembly language
- Keith Booth (born 1974), American basketball coach and former player
- Kieran Booth (born 1980), Australian amateur real tennis player
- Kim Booth (born 1951), Australian politician
- Kirsten Bernthal Booth (born 1974), American volleyball coach
- Koka Booth (1932–2023), American politician and mayor of Cary, North Carolina
- Kristin Booth (born 1974), Canadian actress

== L ==
- Lauren Booth (born 1967), British journalist, broadcaster and activist, half-sister of Cherie Booth
- Laurence Booth (c. 1420–1480), Prince-Bishop of Durham, Lord Chancellor of England and Archbishop of York
- Lawrence Booth (born 1975), English sports writer and editor of Wisden Cricketers' Almanack
- Lewis Booth (born 1948), British accountant and business executive
- Lindy Booth (born 1979), Canadian actress
- Lucy Booth (1868–1953), Salvation Army officer, 8th child of William and Catherine Booth

== M ==
- Major Booth (1886–1916), English cricketer
- Margaret Booth (1898–2002), American film editor
- Marie Booth (1864–1937), 3rd daughter of William and Catherine Booth
- Marilyn Booth (born 1955), author, scholar and translator of Arabic literature
- Martin Booth (1944–2004), British writer and poet
- Mary Ann Booth (1843–1922), American microscopist
- Mary Louise Booth (1831–1889), American editor, translator and writer, first editor-in-chief of Harper's Bazaar
- Matthew Booth (soccer) (born 1977), South African footballer
- Maud Ballington Booth (1865–1948), Salvation Army officer and co-founder of Volunteers of America born Maud Elizabeth Charlesworth

== N ==
- Naomi Booth (born 1980), English writer and academic
- Nathaniel Booth, 4th Baron Delamer (1709–1770), English peer
- Nathaniel Booth (slave) (1826–1901), African-American escaped slave
- Newell Snow Booth (1903–1968), American Methodist bishop
- Newton Booth (1825–1892), American entrepreneur and politician

== P ==
- Pat Booth (journalist) (1929–2018), New Zealand journalist
- Paul Booth (disambiguation)
- Philip Booth (disambiguation)
- Philip Adrian Booth (born 1960) British-Canadian filmmaker and musician known for the rediscovered song "Ulterior Motives"

== R ==
- Richard Booth (1938–2019), British bookseller, pioneering second-hand bookseller of Hay-on-Wye

== S ==
- Samuel Booth (1775–1842), father of William Booth
- Samuel Booth (politician) (1818–1894), English-American politician
- Samuel B. Booth (1883–1935), Episcopalian bishop
- Scott Booth (born 1971), Scottish football coach and former player
- Sean Booth, British musician; see the electronic music group Autechre
- Sherman Booth (1812–1904), Abolitionist
- Shirley Booth (1898–1992), American actress
- Stanley Booth (1942–2024), American music journalist
- Stanley Booth-Clibborn (1924–1996), British Anglican bishop
- Stefan Booth (born 1979), British actor
- Stephen Booth (disambiguation)

== T ==
- Taylor Booth (mathematician) (1933–1986), American mathematician
- Taylor Booth (soccer) (born 2001), American soccer player
- Tim Booth (born 1960), British singer
- Tommy Booth (born 1949), English footballer
- Tony Booth (actor) (1931–2017), British actor
- Tony Booth (musician) (born 1943), American country music singer

== W ==
- Walter Booth (1791–1870), American politician
- Walter C. Booth (1874–1944), American college football head coach
- Walter R. Booth (1869–1938), British magician and film pioneer
- Wayne C. Booth (1921–2005), American literary critic
- William Booth (disambiguation)

== See also ==
- Justice Booth (disambiguation)
- Booth (disambiguation)
- Boothe, a surname
- Baron Basing, the barons' family name being Sclater-Booth
- Gore-Booth
