= Boothe =

Boothe (/buːθ/) is a surname. It is the alternate spelling of Booth. Notable people with the surname include:

- Armistead L. Boothe (1907–1990), American politician
- Chris Boothe, fictional character from the soap opera Passions
- Clare Boothe Luce (1903–1987), American author and politician
- Demico Boothe, American author
- Jill Kinmont Boothe (1936–2012), American skier
- Ken Boothe (born 1948), Jamaican singer
- Kevin Boothe (born 1983), American football player
- Lorna Boothe (born 1954), Jamaican-born British athlete
- Powers Boothe (1948–2017), American actor

== See also ==
- Boothe Lake
- Boothe Memorial Park and Museum
- Booth (surname)
- Booth (disambiguation)
