= Nathan B. Booth House =

Historic house in Connecticut, United States

- U.S. National Register of Historic Places
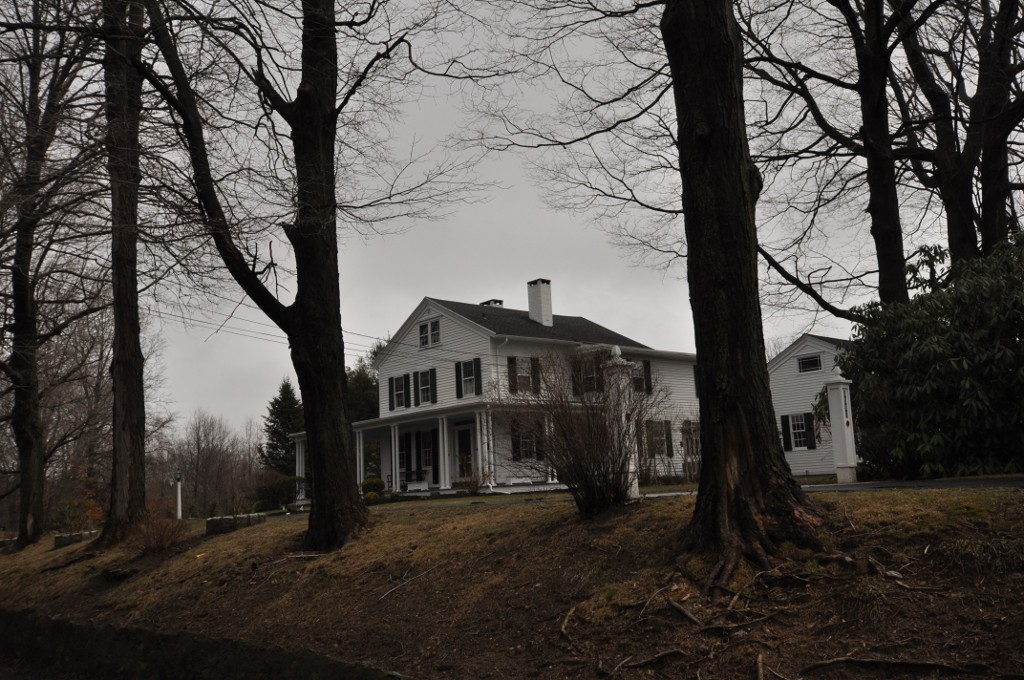

- Location within Connecticut
- Location: 6080 Main Street, Stratford, Connecticut
- Coordinates: 41°14′21.04″N 73°6′35.74″W
- Area: 1 acre (0.40 ha)
- Built: 1843
- Architectural style: Greek Revival, Federal
- NRHP reference No.: 92000317
- Added to NRHP: April 17, 1992

The Nathan B. Booth House is a historic house at 6080 Main Street in the Putney section of Stratford, Connecticut. Built in 1843 for a prosperous farmer, the house is a well-preserved example of transitional Federal-Greek Revival architecture, and the area's only known gable-fronted house of the period. It was listed on the National Register of Historic Places in 1992.

== Description and history ==
The Nathan B. Booth House stands in what is now a residential area of the Putney section of Stratford, on the east side of Main Street a short way north of the Boothe Memorial Park and Museum. It is set on a rise above the street, with its front facade facing west. It is a 2 1/2-story timber-frame structure, with a gabled roof and clapboarded exterior. A single-story porch of early 20th-century construction extends across the front facade and around part of the north and south sides. The main facade is three asymmetrically placed bays wide, with the main entrance set in the rightmost bay, flanked by sidelight windows and topped by a transom. The ground floor windows are full length in the Greek Revival style. The interior follows a fairly typical Greek Revival side hall plan, with a curved staircase rising in the main hall, and many other original period features. It illustrates a vernacular transition between Greek Revival architecture and Federal architecture styles.

The house was built about 1843 for Nathan Booth, on land belonging to his father, Abijah. Although the building outwardly appears Greek Revival, its timber-frame construction is more commonly associated with earlier Federal and Georgian construction. Booth was a successful farmer, probably providing produce for the burgeoning markets of Bridgeport. He also appears to have harvested oysters, probably from a marshy island he owned in the nearby Housatonic River. However, he probably overextended himself financially, and was forced to sell the farm in 1877.

== See also ==
- National Register of Historic Places listings in Fairfield County, Connecticut
