= John Booth =

John Booth may refer to:

== Politics ==
- John Booth (Australian politician) (1822–1898), member of the New South Wales Legislative Assembly for West Sydney and East Macquarie
- John David Booth (1951–2011), member of the New South Wales Legislative Assembly for Wakehurst
- John Paton Booth (1837–1902), politician in British Columbia, Canada
- John Booth (Lancashire politician) (died 1422), Member of Parliament (MP) for Lancashire
- John Booth (Appleby politician), MP for Appleby in 1421
- John Booth (Derby politician), MP for Derby in 1432
- John Booth (Weobley politician), MP for Weobly in 1679

== Religion ==
- John Booth (bishop) (died 1478), churchman and bishop of Exeter
- John Boothe (died 1542), archdeacon of Hereford
- John C. Booth (died 1996), member of the Governing Body of Jehovah's Witnesses and related offices

== Sports ==
- John Booth (rugby league) (born c. 1920), English rugby league footballer who played in the 1940s and 1950s
- John Booth (Australian footballer) (born 1942), Australian rules footballer
- Jack Booth (John William Booth, 1918–1999), Australian rules footballer
- John Booth (motor racing) (born 1954), former team principal of Marussia F1 Team

== Others ==
- Sir John Booth (1610–1678), Colonel in the Army and Governor of Warrington
- John Booth (architect) (1759–1843), British architect
- John Rudolphus Booth (1827–1925), Canadian lumber and railway baron
- John Wilkes Booth (1838–1865), American actor and assassin of President Abraham Lincoln
- John Hunter Booth (1886–1971), American playwright
- John Booth (magician) (1912–2009), American professional magician and writer on the history of magic performance
- John Stanley Booth (1919–1958), English aviator

== See also ==
- Booth (surname)
