= Edwin Booth (disambiguation) =

Edwin Booth (1833–1893) was an American actor.

Edwin Booth may also refer to:

- Edwin Henry Booth (1833–1899), English businessman, founder of Booths supermarkets
- Edwin J. Booth (born 1955), English businessman, chairman of Booths supermarkets, gt-gt-grandson of Edwin Henry
