= Henry Booth (disambiguation) =

Henry Booth (1788–1869) was a British corn merchant and engineer.

Henry Booth may also refer to:

- Henry Booth, 1st Earl of Warrington (1652–1694), MP for Cheshire
- Henry Booth (MP for Derbyshire) (died 1446)
- Henry Booth (cricketer) (1815–1883), English cricketer

== See also ==
- Sir Henry Gore-Booth, 5th Baronet (1843–1900), Arctic explorer, adventurer and landowner
- Harry Booth (disambiguation)
- Booth (surname)
