= Joseph Booth =

Joseph Booth may refer to:

- Joseph Booth (actor) (died 1797), English tradesman, actor and inventor
- Joseph Booth (missionary) (1851–1932), British missionary to Africa
- Joe Booth (1871-1931), English footballer, see List of Bury F.C. players (1–24 appearances)
- Joseph Booth (rugby union) (1873–1958), Welsh-born rugby union forward
- Joseph Booth (bishop) (1887–1965), archbishop of Melbourne
- Joseph Booth & Bros, UK manufacturer of cranes 1847-present
- Joseph Booth (politician)

== See also ==
- Seeley Booth aka Seeley Joseph Booth, a fictional character from the Fox television program Bones
