= Lusby =

Lusby may refer to:

- Lusby, Lincolnshire
- Lusby, Maryland
