= Bne IntelliNews =

News wire agency and media company

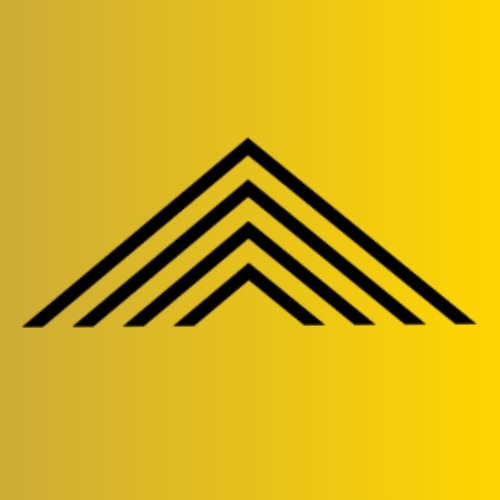
- Formerly: Business News Europe, IntelliNews Ltd
- Company type: Subsidiary
- Traded as: Bne IntelliNews
- Industry: News
- Founded: 2006; 20 years ago
- Founder: Benedict Aris
- Headquarters: Berlin, Germany
- Number of locations: 30 bureaus in different locations in Europe, CIS, West and South Asia, Africa, South America.
- Area served: Global newswire service
- Key people: Ben Aris, Mark Buckton, Clare Nuttall, William Conroy, Bill Perceval-Maxwell
- Products: Newswire, articles
- Brands: Business News Europe Monthly Magazine, IntelliNews newswire services, NewsBase energy monitor
- Number of employees: 100 (100)
- Parent: Business News Europe Limited
- Divisions: Business News Middle East (BNM), Business News Africa (BNA), Business News East Asia (BNO), Business News Latin America (BNL).
- Subsidiaries: Newsbase Energy Monitor
- Website: www.intellinews.com

bne IntelliNews, previously known as Business News Europe, is a news wire agency and media company focusing on global emerging markets. The company's name is stylized in all lower-case letters as "bne" and "IntelliNews" in its publications. The company primarily offers daily news through its flagship website, but also publishes a bne IntelliNews magazine (previously called Business News Europe), a monthly English-language magazine. Bne IntelliNews work has been translated and also syndicated to several other publications and languages across Europe, Asia and the Americas, being a partner news agency to several companies including Bloomberg Terminal, LexisNexis, and Reuters.

== History ==
Its founder, Ben Aris, had been covering Russia as a reporter since 1993. bne IntelliNews combines bne Media, the publisher of bne magazine founded in 2006, and Emerging Markets Direct, the parent publisher of the IntelliNews news and views founded in 1998. Aris founded bne Media after leaving The Guardian due to boredom. Both companies were merged in 2014 by Jerome Booth's New Sparta Ltd. In 2016, following the departure of Booth, bne IntelliNews became independently owned and operated, with Ben Aris as the controlling stakeholder.

In April 2026, bne IntelliNews announced the establishment of the IntelliNews Reputation Leaders Awards, an annual award for companies from Eastern Europe, Eurasia, the Middle East, and Africa, recognising contributions to industry development, corporate practices, and performance.
