= Henry Booth (cricketer) =

English cricketer

Henry William Booth (1815 – 7 August 1883) was an English first-class cricketer who played for Cambridge University.

He was born in Roydon, Essex. He was a nephew of the Arctic explorer Sir Felix Booth, of the family that produced Booth's Gin. He was educated at Eton and was at Christ's College, Cambridge, for five terms from January 1835 to June 1836, though he did not take a degree. During this time he appeared in six first-class cricket matches, including one against Oxford University in 1836, and was awarded a blue. He died in Chiswick.

== Bibliography ==
- Haygarth, Arthur (1996) [1862]. Scores & Biographies, Volume 1 (1744–1826). Kennington: Frederick Lillywhite. ISBN 978-19-00592-23-9.
- Haygarth, Arthur (1997) [1862]. Scores & Biographies, Volume 2 (1827–1840). Kennington: Frederick Lillywhite. ISBN 978-19-00592-23-9.
