= Booth (given name) =

Booth is a masculine given name of English origin.

== List of people with given name Booth ==
- Booth Colman (1923-2014), American film, television and stage actor
- Booth Gardner, American politician
- Booth Grey (1740–1802), British politician
- Booth Grey (1783–1850), British politician
- Booth Savage, Canadian actor
- Booth Tarkington (1869-1946), American writer
- Booth Samuels,

== See also ==
- Booth (surname)
- Booth (disambiguation)
