= Harold Booth =

Harold Booth may refer to:

- Harold Booth (footballer) (1886–1964), Australian rules footballer
- Harold E. Booth (1911–1970), candidate in California's 4th State Assembly district
- Harold Booth, candidate in Results of the South Australian state election, 1975 (House of Assembly)
- Harold Booth, who wrote on British Naturism

== See also ==
- Harry Booth (disambiguation)
