= Paul Booth =

Paul Booth may refer to:

- Paul Booth (tattoo artist) (born 1968), American tattoo artist
- Paul Booth (cricketer) (born 1965), English cricketer
- Paul Booth (rugby) (1865–1914), English rugby union footballer
- Paul Booth (labor organizer) (1943–2018), activist and labor organizer
- Paul Booth (historian) (born 1946), British medieval historian and teacher
- Paul Booth (media scholar), Professor of Media and Pop Culture Studies at DePaul University

== See also ==
- Paul Boothe (born 1954), Canadian civil servant and academic
