= Harry Booth =

Harry Booth may refer to:

- Harry Booth (coach) (1941–2022), American college baseball and basketball coach
- Harry Booth (criminal) or Terence Hogan (1931–1995), English professional criminal
- Harry Booth (filmmaker), English filmmaker
- Harry Booth (rugby league), English rugby league footballer of the 1910s and 1920s
- Harry Booth, fictional character in the 1979 film The Black Hole

== See also ==
- Henry Booth (disambiguation)
- Harold Booth (disambiguation)
