= Paul Boothe =

Canadian civil servant and academic (born 1954)

Paul Michael Boothe CM (born March 29, 1954) is a Canadian former senior civil servant, academic and non-profit CEO. Boothe was awarded the Order of Canada, Canada's highest civilian honour, in 2016 for his contributions to shaping Canadian economic and fiscal policy both in academia and government service.

== Education ==
BA (Honours) in Economics, University of Western Ontario, 1976. PhD in Economics, University of British Columbia, 1981.

== Career ==
After three years in the International Department of the Bank of Canada, Boothe joined the Economics Department at the University of Alberta in 1984. He was appointed a Professor in 1992. He served as the Director of the Institute for Public Economics from 1997–1999, and again from 2002 to 2004. In 1998, he delivered the C.D. Howe Institute's Annual Benefactors’ Lecture. Boothe has published more than eighty scholarly books and monographs, articles and book chapters.

In 1999, Boothe was appointed Deputy Minister of Finance and Secretary of Treasury Board for the Province of Saskatchewan. In 2004, he served as G7 Deputy and Associate Deputy Minister for Finance Canada. He later served as Senior Associate Deputy Ministry for Industry Canada (2007–2010) and Deputy Minister for Environment Canada (2010–2012). At Industry Canada, he led the Canadian federal government’s negotiation team during the restructuring negotiations with Chrysler and General Motors.

Boothe retired from the federal public service in 2012 and was appointed Professor and Director of the Ivey Business School's Lawrence National Centre for Policy and Management. Together with the late Richard Dicerni, Boothe founded the non-profit organization Trillium Network for Advanced Manufacturing. He retired from Ivey in 2016 and served as Trillium’s Managing Director until 2019.

In June 2024, Boothe was named as Chair of the executive Board of Directors supporting the transition of Sustainable Development Technology Canada’s programming to the National Research Council of Canada (NRC).

Boothe’s work experience includes university research and teaching and acting as an independent consultant to Canadian and international organizations. He is a retired professor at the Ivey Business School, past director of the Lawrence National Centre for Policy and Management and a former faculty member at the University of Alberta. He is the author, co-author or editor of more than 80 articles, monographs and books.

== Outside activities ==
Boothe is a frequent op-ed author and media commentator.

He was appointed a member of the Order of Canada in 2016 for contributions to shaping Canada's economic and fiscal policies as an academic and senior civil servant. He has served on the Ecofiscal Commission and has served on the board of the Max Bell Foundation.
