= Sustainable Development Technology Canada =

Government of Canada initiative

- Technologies du développement durable Canada

Agency overview
- Formed: 2001
- Dissolved: 2024
- Jurisdiction: Government of Canada
- Headquarters: Ottawa, Ontario
- Website: www.sdtc.ca (archived)

Sustainable Development Technology Canada (SDTC; French: Technologies du développement durable Canada) was an arm's-length foundation created by the Government of Canada to fund new clean technologies.

In 2001 following a bipartisan effort of industry and academic professionals petitioning the federal government to address the damages from climate change, SDTC was finally set up with the approval of a Parliamentary act.

What followed was the development of the only Canadian organization that enjoyed bipartisan political support to develop technologies and practical solutions to fight climate change.

== History ==
In 2001, the Government of Canada created Sustainable Development Technology Canada (SDTC) as an arm's-length foundation to “demonstrate new technologies to promote sustainable development, including technologies to address issues related to climate change and the quality of air, water and soil.” These clean technologies, such as fuel cells and biofuels, are developed through public-private partnerships with SDTC acting as a funder.

Any companies that were able to demonstrate a viable business need for a technology could apply to SDTC for up to 33% of government funding from the fund. Recognizing the immense challenges of developing technologies in the field that required heavy capital asset investment, the Government of Canada also allowed up to 75% of funding on SDTC projects to come from the family of other government funds. Creating a networked ecosystem that was able to grow the Canadian Cleantech industry through the years.

SDTC loosely followed the Technology Readiness Level, TRL system created by NASA for the development of the Space Shuttle program and adapted to invest in Canadian technologies. Specializing in TRL 3 to TRL 8 technologies in many advanced scientific fields.

SDTC has had successive CEOs and Board Members form the notable elite of the Canadian innovation ecosystem. These individuals have come from a cross section of the business community that has enabled Canada to enjoy a pioneering position in the field of global cleantech development.

While SDTC has done many things right they had a notable lack of ability to navigate some critical challenges that all Canadian companies experience. These include regulatory challenges and finding the first 10 customers. Over the last 23 years SDTC has helped impact the Canadian government by starting programs like the Build in Canada Innovation Program.

In 2019 Annette Verschuren, notable Canadian business personality, was brought in to be the Chair of the Board and lend her expertise as a portfolio company. Prior to Ms. Verschuren's appointment the portfolio companies had limited representation on the Board of Directors. At the time of appointment Ms. Verschuren was also an executive of a portfolio company among other national appointments. SDTC was unique in its ability to respond faster to the needs of the portfolio companies due to the leadership of its CEO, Leah Lawrence who had the ability to be bipartisan in her ability to navigate the complex political environment in which the agency operated.

The primary issues that portfolio companies experiences in their path to commercialization in Canada were related to regulatory issues. These issues resulted through complex regulatory environments that intersected multiple level of governments. Regulations in each industry created barriers to the commercial adoption of technology. Ms. Verschuren was uniquely qualified to speak to these issues as her own experience in Canada intersected many similar sectors.

Over the tenure of SDTC complex changes in the organizational structure resulted from poor oversight by its governing agencies. SDTC had a notable lack of diversity that is noted and pervasive in the Canadian federal government. These issues are noted as clear markers that cause productivity stagnation across the Canadian economy and have stagnated innovation in Canada for decades.

Discrimination and bias are an economic externality in a similar manner that carbon is. This is uniquely relevant in the field of sustainability because as the engineering "caring industry" this field is disproportionately represented by women and people from countries that are experiencing the effects of climate change now. This effectively entangles women's economic mobility with climate change.

It is noteworthy to mention that poorly designed EDI/DEI programs have been cited globally for creating tokenism rather than real meritocratic mobility of experts in their fields.

In 2023 SDTC was suspended following an effort by a whistleblower team and an investigation began in its workplace culture. While many notable cleantech investors were alarmed by the issues, the primary challenge with the SDTC method of allocating capital was the emphasis on the nature of how the Contribution Agreements were limiting the flexibility of founders in operating their companies.

Therefore, Aman Chahal, the former Professor for Innovation and Entrepreneurship at the University of Alberta, who initially cited SDTC for investigation believed that many companies were operating with high capital and operating costs but had not proved their commercialization ability. Effectively the sector was being inflated with successive funds and the lack of checks and balances created an investment bubble similar to the sub-prime mortgage collapse in 2007. Aman Chahal anticipated that the investigation would reveal that a new Contribution Agreement was needed along with a revision on the Parliamentary act that would make the cleantech sector more effective.

Aman Chahal was not part of any official investigation and is a vocal critic of the whistleblower efforts. While initially sympathetic to their cause, she believes their lack of industry knowledge led them to misunderstand how Government Funds and Private Investments work and she has since vocally distanced herself from the efforts of the team to close the fund rather than work with the government in finding an effective solution.

Successive investigations into SDTC were carried out by Innovation Science and Economic Development Canada, ISED and then the Auditor General of Canada. The whistleblowers cited a cover-up following the initial investigation with ISED leading to a second investigation with the Auditor General of Canada.

On 8 November 2023, SDTC board chair Annette Verschuren told the Canadian House of Commons Standing Committee on Access to Information, Privacy and Ethics that she had approved grants worth more than C$ 200,000 to her energy storage firm NRStor Inc., with the money having originally been part of the SDTC's efforts to fund SDTC-linked companies with existing funding arrangements during the COVID-19 pandemic. On 10 November, Leah Lawrence resigned as CEO of SDTC in connection with the board approved payment, which was revealed via a whistleblower complaint in early 2023. Verschuren announced on 19 November she will resign as chair of the Board of Directors in relation to the scandal effective 1 December.

On 12 December 2023, the whistleblower, Israr Ahmad, a former SDTC employee, testified before the Canadian House of Commons Standing Committee on Industry, Science and Technology that the SDTC had misspent millions of dollars in public funds, including $40M worth of special payments to SDTC-linked companies in 2021. The SDTC had allegedly determined the companies had no need for these payments as they already had a sufficient amount of money to spend on their activities without suffering from the economic effects of the COVID-19 pandemic. The whistleblower also alleged that the SDTC had created a toxic workplace environment by firing several human resource managers. These allegations were found to have no basis after being investigated by the government.

On 4 June 2024, the SDTC was disbanded as an independent arm's-length foundation and folded into the National Research Council Canada following a report from Auditor General of Canada Karen Hogan, who revealed that the fund had awarded $59 million to 10 projects who were ineligible for funding and had frequently overstated their projects' benefits. Former senior civil servant Paul Boothe will lead a three-person board to help the SDTC transition into an agency directly under the control of the government. The agency was disbanded without any Industry Expert Consultation process.

On 24 July 2024, ethics commissioner Konrad von Finckenstein found Verschuren to be in violation of ethics for the scandal.

== Investments ==
As of 2018, the Government of Canada's total investment into SDTC was C$965 million, based on a formal evaluation by the Ministry of Innovation, Science and Economic Development Canada . The Auditor General of Canada reported expenditures of C$836 million between 2017 and 2023.

SDTC acted as a government fund for its tenure. It was the premiere government granting agency in Canada that was evolving, with the industry, into an investment fund. SDTC was often cited as the first money a company could secure that would then enable companies to unlock private sector funding.

SDTC has invested in about 300 projects throughout Canada. On average 33% (up to 40%) of projects costs can be covered the program.

== Governance ==
Leah Lawrence was the president and CEO of Sustainable Development Technology Canada until her resignation in 2023. Until 2024, SDTC was overseen by a Board of Directors, with Annette Verschuren formerly as the chair. It will now be overseen by a three-person board to help the fund transition into a government-controlled fund, led by former senior civil servant Paul Boothe as chair, along with former senior civil servants Cassie Doyle and Marta Morgan.
