= Peniston Booth =

British Anglican priest

Penyston Booth
- Dean of Windsor
- Dean Booth's coat of arms
- Church: Church of England
- Diocese: Royal Peculiar
- In office: 1729–1765
- Predecessor: George Verney
- Successor: Frederick Keppel
- Previous posts: Canon of Windsor; Prebendary of Welton; Canon Chancellor of St Paul's

Orders
- Ordination: 1703 (Lincoln Cathedral)

Personal details
- Born: 1681 Lusby, Lincolnshire
- Died: 21 September 1765 (aged 83–84) Windsor, Berkshire
- Buried: St George's Chapel, Windsor
- Denomination: Christian (CofE)
- Parents: Thomas Booth; Elizabeth née Penyston
- Occupation: Priest
- Profession: Theologian
- Education: Magdalene College, Cambridge (MA, DD)
- Motto: Quod ero spero

Penyston Booth (1681 – 21 September 1765), also Peniston Booth, was an 18th-century Anglican priest, who hailed from the minor gentry, and served as Dean of Windsor from 1729 to 1765.

== Family ==
Born at Lusby, Lincolnshire, he was the son of Thomas Booth and his wife Elizabeth (née Penyston) and a cousin of Sir Fairmeadow Penyston. His family were lords of the manor of Killingholme, originally from Barton in Lancashire. An elder brother, Captain Robert Booth (died 1742), married in 1725 Lady Susannah Clinton (died 1754), daughter of Francis, 6th Earl of Lincoln, and sister-in-law of Thomas Pelham-Holles, 1st Duke of Newcastle (Prime Minister of Great Britain).

Booth married Katherine, daughter of the Revd Canon Edward Jones, in 1728. Their only child, Katherine Booth (whose eldest son was Sir Thomas Tyrwhitt Jones) is an ancestor of the 16th and present Baroness Berners.

The Lincolnshire family are progenitors of Sir Felix Booth and a cadet branch of the Booth family which inherited the Dunham Massey estates via marriage in the 15th century; they were created Earls of Warrington in 1690.

== Education ==
Booth was educated at Lincoln Grammar School and Magdalene College, Cambridge, receiving a Bachelor of Arts (BA) degree in 1702, proceeding Master of Arts (MA) in 1705.

Elected a Fellow of Magdalene College in 1702, Booth was ordained in 1703 by Dr James Gardiner, Bishop of Lincoln. He was conferred with the degree of Doctor of Divinity (DD) by Cambridge University in 1728, having been elected a Fellow of the Royal Society (FRS) in 1703.

== Ecclesiastical ministry ==
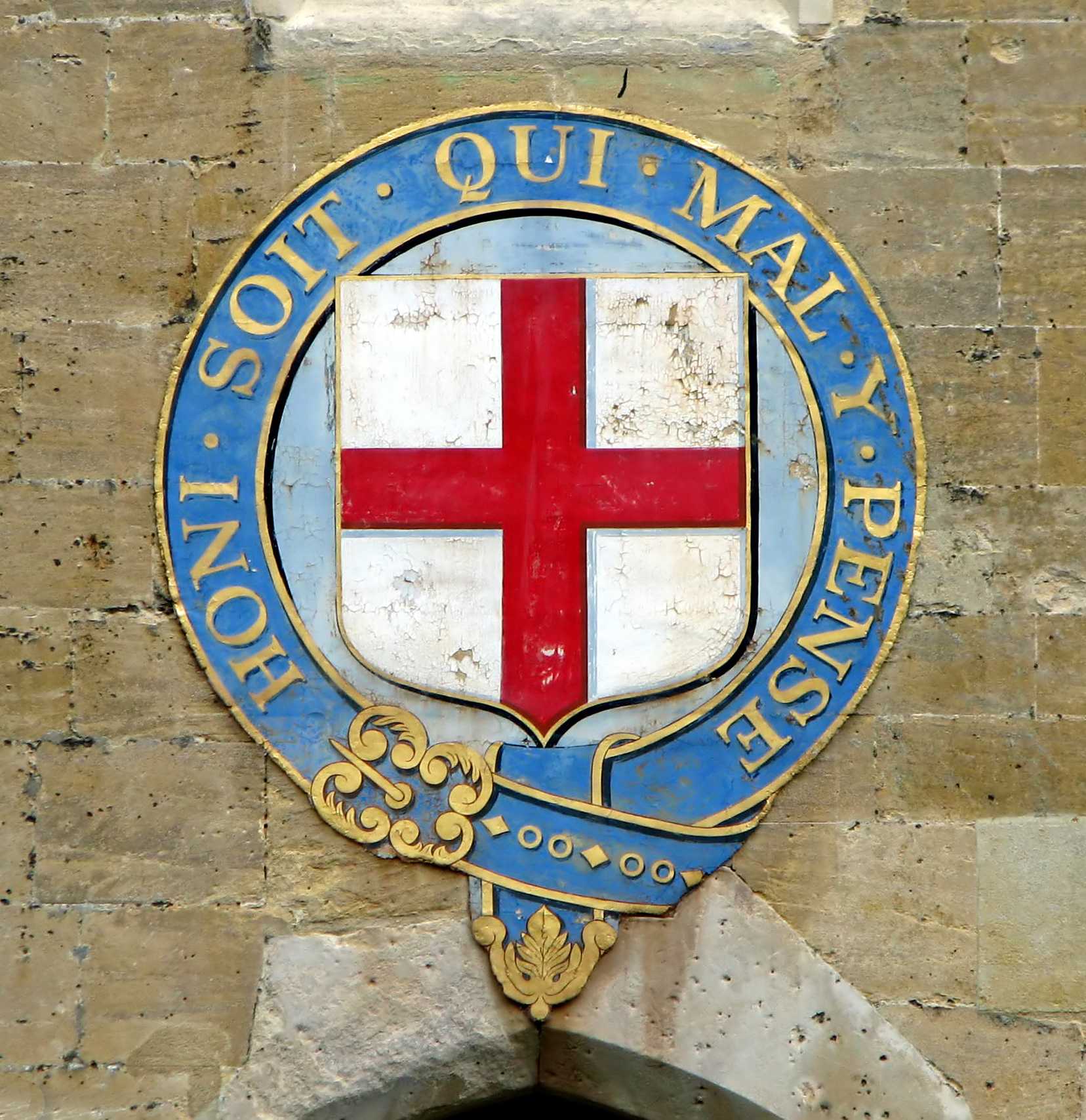
The Garter badge above a doorway to St George's Chapel.

Booth was a canon of Windsor from 1722 to 1729, before serving as dean until his death in 1765.

During his ministry in the Church of England, he held the following ecclesiastical appointments:

- Perpetual curate of Apley, Lincolnshire, 1707
- Rector of Potterhanworth, 1717
- Prebendary of Welton in Lincoln Cathedral, 1719
- Canon of Windsor, 1722–1729
- Dean of Wolverhampton, 1729
- Canon chancellor of St Paul's Cathedral, 1733.

Appointed Canon of the Second Stall of Windsor in 1722, Booth relinquished this sinecure upon becoming dean following the death of Lord Willoughby de Broke in 1728.

Dean of Windsor and ex-officio register of the Order of the Garter from 1729 until his death in 1765, Booth was succeeded by former bishop of Exeter, Dr. Frederick Keppel.

Booth was buried at St George's Chapel, a week after his death, on 29 September 1765.

== See also ==
- Booth family
- Earls of Warrington
- Dean of Windsor

Church of England titles
| Preceded by The Rt Hon. and Very Revd; The Lord Willoughby de Broke | Dean of Windsor; 1729–1765 | Succeeded by The Hon. and Rt Revd; Frederick Keppel |
