= Canada's Ecofiscal Commission =

Canadian economics project formed in 2014

Ecofiscal Commission
- Founded: 2014
- Founded at: Canada
- Type: Non profit organization
- Purpose: Fiscal policy
- Key people: Christopher Ragan; Michael Harcourt; Jim Dinning
- Website: ecofiscal.ca

Canada's Ecofiscal Commission is an economics project formed in 2014 by a group of Canadian economists from across the country. Chaired by McGill University economist Christopher Ragan, the group seeks to broaden the discussion of environmental pricing reform beyond the academic sphere and into the realm of practical policy application.

== Policies ==
The Commission focuses on three major policy streams (Climate and energy, Water, and Livable Cities). Key areas of research and policy include:

- Carbon price
- Energy subsidies
- Water pricing
- Municipal user fees
- Congestion pricing
- Landfill and solid waste pricing

== Reports ==
In 2015, the Commission released three reports on the subject of provincial carbon-pricing in Canada—making a case for subnational carbon pricing policy, laying out principles for an effective cap-and-trade policy in Ontario, and explaining carbon competitiveness, respectively. In 2015, the commission also release a report on the subject of congestion pricing, making the case for pilot projects in four Canadian cities: Vancouver, Calgary, Toronto and Montreal. In 2016, the Commission released two more reports on carbon pricing. The first was on different methods of revenue recycling, and the second on comparing stringency. And in the fall of 2016 the Commission released a report on biofuels. In 2017, Ecofiscal released its third major carbon report, focused on what other policies are needed for comprehensive climate packages. It found that three types make sense: gap-fillers, signal-boosters and ones that provide co-benefits. The research emphasized cost-effectiveness. In September 2017, the Commission released its first report on municipal water. Titled Only the Pipes Should be Hidden, the report makes the case for user fees to tackle the interrelated problems of infrastructure gaps, water quality and a need for more conservation.

== Advisory board ==
Composed of Canadian leaders in industry, the environment, and across the political spectrum, the commission's advisory board provide guidance, and diverse perspectives on how to design practical ecofiscal policies for Canada's unique context.

Advisors include:

- Elyse Allan
- Gordon Campbell
- Jean Charest
- Karen Clarke-Whistler
- Jim Dinning
- Peter Gilgan
- Michael Harcourt
- Bruce Lourie
- Paul Martin
- Peter Robinson
- Lorne Trottier
- Annette Verschuren
- Steve Williams
