= Felix Booth =

British gin distiller and exploration financier

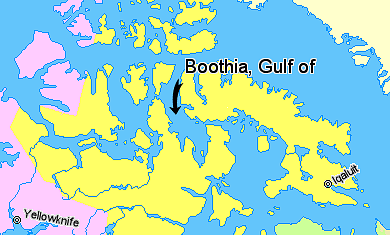
Map indicating the Gulf of Boothia, Nunavut, Canada Nunavut Northwest Territories Greenland

Sir Felix Booth, 1st Baronet, FRS (16 July 1780 Clerkenwell – 24 January 1850 Brighton, Sussex) was a wealthy British gin distiller, and promoter of Arctic exploration, with various places in Nunavut, Canada, being named after him.

== Family lineage ==
Booth's ancestry traces back beyond the 13th century when his family were lords of the manor of Barton, Lancashire. Five generations later, Sir John Booth (1350–1422) wed twice at Eccles parish church where the Booths were patrons of the living, firstly to Joan Trafford (died 1411) and secondly to Maude Savage, collectively producing thirteen children (and two Archbishops of York).

Their eldest son, Sir Thomas Booth (1395–1482), married Isabel Carrington in 1431, before settling on family estates in Lincolnshire. The second son, Sir Robert Booth made a particularly advantageous marriage in 1409 to Dulcia Venables, thereby inheriting de jure uxoris the vast Massey estates in North-West England and whose descendants were ennobled in the 17th century as Barons Delamer then Earls of Warrington. Other family cadets include the Booth baronets (of Allerton Beeches), the Gore-Booth baronets, Lois Frances Booth (Countess of Rosenborg) and Dr Claire Booth (Countess of Ulster).

Sir Thomas and Lady Isabel (née Carrington) had seven offspring, giving rise to two Booth families in Lincolnshire: William Booth married Ann Ashton at Goxhill founding the "Booths of Goxhill", whilst their younger son Henry Booth (1425–1500), who became Deputy Admiral of the North, married Elizabeth Gascoyn in 1460, being progenitors of the "Booths of Killingholme" following the marriage of Sir John Booth (1582–1617) with the heiress Elizabeth Ayscough; they are ancestors of the Booth baronets of Portland Place.

Five generations later, John Booth of Killingholme (1556–1597) married Martha Butler circa 1573 and they had four offspring, of which their son George Booth (1582–1617) married in 1607 Elizabeth Monckton. Their son Captain William Booth (1608–1657) married at Market Rasen on 13 June 1631 Elizabeth Wright, daughter of John Wright. Captain Booth's marriage produced ten offspring, of whom their son Thomas Booth, born 1639 (Sir Felix Booth's great-great-grandfather), married at Market Rasen on 23 November 1670 Elizabeth Middlemore (died 1687), producing four sons and four daughters. Their first son (Sir Felix's great-grandfather) Rev John Booth (1672–1717) was Rector of Lusby, and married Elizabeth Sanderson on 20 June 1700 at Ulceby. The third son was Captain Robert Booth (1677–1742), who married Lady Susannah Clinton (1680–1754), only daughter of the 6th Earl of Lincoln. The fourth son, Very Rev Dr Penyston Booth (1681–1765), married Katherine Jones, daughter of Rev Dr Edward Jones.

Rev John Booth and Elizabeth Sanderson's second son William, born 1703, married Alice Green on 25 July 1729 at Ulceby and they would have eight children comprising six boys and two girls. Their first son Richard Booth, born 22 July 1730, married Ann Hill in 1753 at Irby upon Humber near Caistor and took up residence in the village of Caistor. Richard and Ann had nine children comprising six sons and three daughters; their last born son Samuel Booth, born 1773, married Ann Wastnedge in 1799 and had a son named Felix Booth, born 1805. Richard Booth died in 1800 aged 70. It was reported in The Gentleman's Magazine in 1840 that "the late Richard Booth's daughter Miss Elizabeth Booth of Caistor Lincolnshire died on 22nd April 1840 in her 82nd year. She was a cousin to Sir Felix Booth".

Rev John Booth and Elizabeth Sanderson's third son John, born 1711 (Sir Felix's grandfather), made his way to London and became involved in the distillery business, from which a major British company would evolve. John married a Mary Watts on 3 January 1739 at Westminster London, and by 1740, John's distillery, Booth's Gin, was very popular. John and Mary produced at least four offspring including Sir Felix's father Philip in 1745 (substantiated by his obituary saying he died on 5 May 1818 aged 73). A second son John Booth was born 1748 and reference to him was reported in The Gentleman's Magazine in 1804: "John Booth's youngest daughter Jane died in her seventeenth year at Caistor Lincolnshire". She was presumably visiting or staying with her Uncle Richard Booth and Aunt Ann Booth. Nothing is known about the remaining offspring.

Around 1760, Philip Booth joined his father in the family business and in about 1771, he married Elizabeth Walls, whose father lived – as did Philip – in the new and fashionable Russell Square on the Bedford Estate in Bloomsbury. Philip and Elizabeth produced seven children: Elizabeth, born 18 July 1773; William, born 25 July 1774; John Gillyat, born 17 March 1776; Mary, born 15 August 1777; Philip, born 24 November 1778; Felix, born 16 July 1780; and Alice, born 4 August 1782. In the Directory of Merchants for 1778, when Philip was aged 33, there is the entry of the firm Philip Booth and Company, Distillers, of 55 Turnmill Street in Clerkenwell London.

== Distillery career ==
Felix and his brothers joined the family business and were groomed as Philip's successors. However shortly before Philip's death in 1818, the original family partnership was dissolved and a new one was established between John Gillyat and Felix. Together they had – to a great extent – rebuilt the Turnmill Street premises and Felix would subsequently obtain sole control of the business.

With energy and drive, Felix expanded the business by building a second distillery at Brentford on the River Thames just six miles from Hyde Park Corner, and purchasing the neighbouring brewery of Hazard and Company, which he renamed as the Red Lion Brewery. By establishing a distillery at Edinburgh in Scotland, Booth could then boast that he was the owner of the biggest distilling business in Great Britain.

In 1832, Sir Felix Booth bought the site of the old Ophthalmic Hospital in Albany Street, Regent's Park as a site for his distillery. In 1840, he went into partnership with William Grimble to experiment with producing vinegar from the spirits left over from the manufacturing process. The site was in the north-east corner of Cumberland Market. The venture was unsuccessful so Sir Felix reverted to the more conventional method of vinegar brewing.

== Hull court case ==
Between 1840 and 1843, Booth was faced with a blackmail situation and it was ultimately taken to court in 1843. His aforementioned cousin, Felix (born 1805), no doubt envious of Sir Felix's wealth, threatened – with the intent to exhort money – to reveal to the police that Sir Felix had committed unlawful sexual crimes, namely homosexual relations with a young man named Marr. Sir Felix attended the hearing in Hull Yorkshire, vigorously denying the claims his cousin asserted. Sir Felix admitted to the court that he had fathered a son with a Scottish woman in Edinburgh that he was very fond of, and had financially assisted the son as he came of age. The court ruled Sir Felix to be innocent of his charges and Felix was found guilty of blackmail and sentenced to twenty years' transportation to Australia.

== Geographical expeditions ==
Fascinated by science, Booth decided to use his amassed wealth to privately fund a voyage of exploration to the Arctic Seas to find the Northwest Passage, financing Captain John Ross and his crew of twenty-two men, equipped with stores and supplies to last several years, on a voyage on the paddle-steamer "Victory". With £17,000 from Booth in addition to the £3,000 Ross supplied, they departed from Woolwich Reach on 23 May 1829 and returned to Hull, Yorkshire on 18 October 1833. Whilst Ross had failed to find the fabled Passage, he had dramatically narrowed the need for future expeditions by mapping an area of over half-million square miles. Ross named several of his discoveries — including the Boothia Peninsula and Gulf of Boothia — in his patron's honour. Ross' discovery most important to geographical science was that of the North Magnetic Pole at 96° 46' 45" W. longitude, and 70° 5' 17". For Booth's financial contribution to such an effort, he was knighted by King William IV and subsequently created a baronet "as a reward for his patriotism in fitting out at his sole cost an expedition in the endeavour to discover a North-West Passage".

== Later years and death ==
William Bradley (1801–1857), one of England's leading painters / engravers of the era painted a portrait of Sir Felix Booth around 1850, coloured in a mezzo-tint style which hung in the Court Room of the Coopers' Company until its destruction in an air raid over London during World War II.

Booth died unexpectedly of heart failure whilst staying in a seaside hotel at Brighton in 1850, aged 69. His funeral procession was staged with all the solemn pageantry of the Victorian period, and passed respectful bare-headed villagers lining the roadside in Edmonton and Hoddesdon. Six horses, preceded by outriders, drew the hearse, six coaches of mourners followed it and Sir Felix's private carriage, empty of passengers, brought up the rear. It was said that "Sir Felix Booth dies generally and justly lamented. he was in every respect a princely citizen of London. His immense wealth, acquired by his own industry, was devoted to the benefit or enjoyment of others. His disposition was amiable and his habits splendid. He took delight in hospitality and in acts of kindness and charity".

== Personal life ==
Booth never married. His illegitimate son John Marshall Marr — mentioned in the 1843 Hull Court hearing as simply Mr Marr — married Emma Minchin on 26 September 1836 at Exeter in Devon, and they produced eight daughters and four sons, named George, born 1837; William, born 1845; Arthur, born 1852; and John, born 1855. John Marshall was adequately benefited by his father's testament.

Booth's Gin, owned by Diageo, ceased production in 2017. In November 2018, the brand was sold to the Sazerac Company.

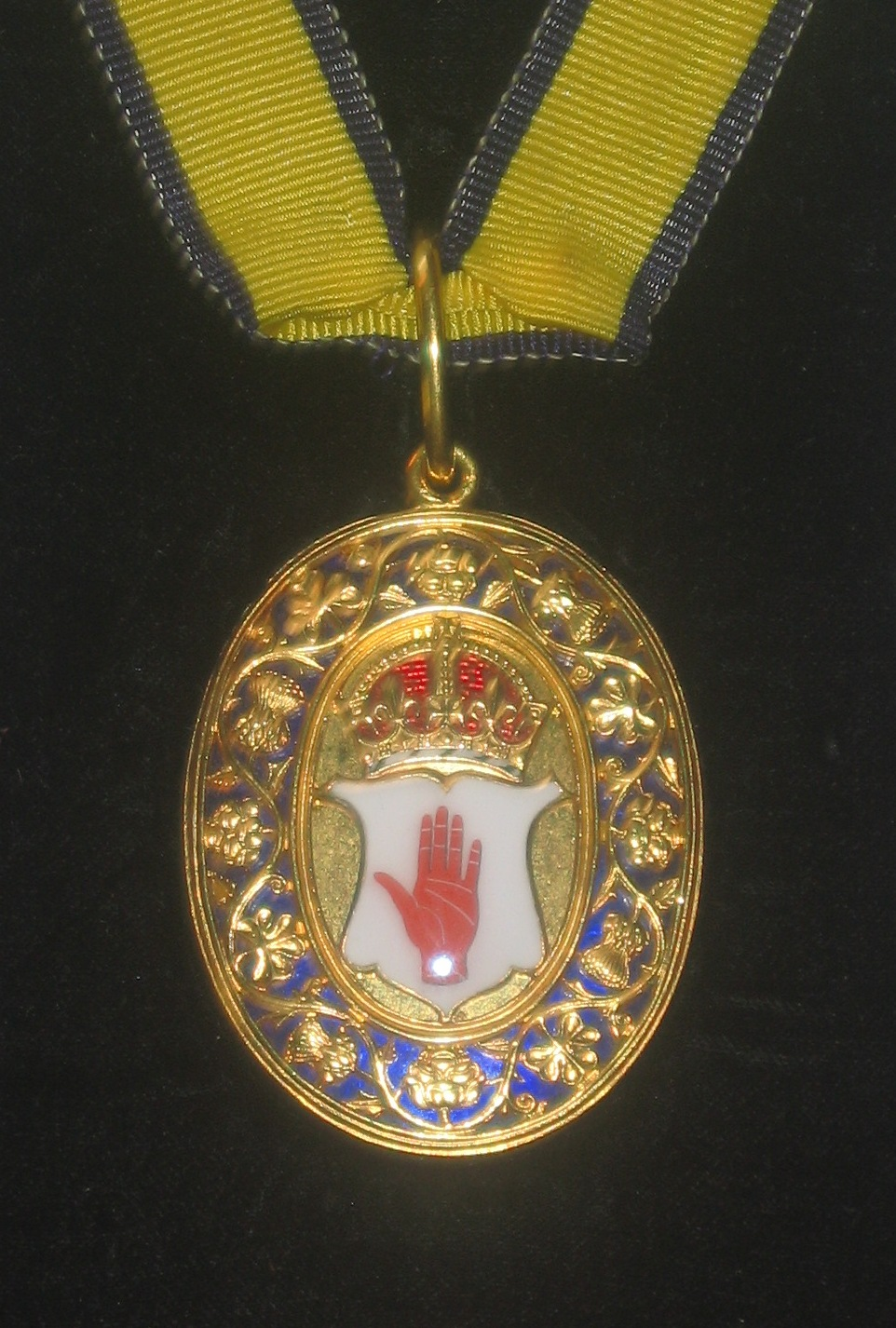
Insignia of Baronet

== Honours and distinctions ==
Having served as Alderman and Master of the Worshipful Company of Coopers, Booth was elected Sheriff of London in 1828.

A founding Fellow of the Royal Geographical Society, Booth was elected a Fellow of the Royal Society on 10 April 1834.

In recognition of his funding the successful Arctic expedition, he was created a baronet as Booth of Portland Place, co. Middlesex and Great Catwood, co. Huntingdon on 27 March 1835, with special remainder, in default of his own legitimate male issue, to the heirs male of his eldest brother, William Booth, of Roydon Hall, Essex. His nephew, Sir Williamson Booth (1810–1877), succeeded him as 2nd baronet.

== See also ==
- Booth baronets
- Booth's Gin
- Nunavut

Baronetage of the United Kingdom
New creation	Baronet (of Portland Place); 1835–1850	Succeeded by Williamson Booth
