= William Booth (disambiguation) =

William Booth (1829–1912) was a British Methodist preacher who founded the Salvation Army.

William or Bill Booth may also refer to:

== Religion ==
- William Booth (priest) (1939–2009), British clergyman
- William Booth (bishop) (died 1464), Archbishop of York
- Bramwell Booth (William Bramwell Booth, 1856–1929), English Salvationist

== Sports ==
- Major Booth (William Booth, 1886–1916), English cricketer
- William Booth (boxer) (born 1944), Australian Olympic boxer
- William Booth (footballer) (1880–?), English footballer
- Bill Booth (footballer) (1920–1990), English football player and manager
- Bill Booth (ice hockey) (1919–1986), Canadian ice hockey player
- Bill Booth (pickleball) (born 1944), Canadian 2023 Pickleball Hall of Fame inductee

== Other fields ==
- William Booth (1526–1591), lord of the manor of Twemlow
- William Booth (captain) (fl.1673–1689), captain in the Royal Navy
- William Booth (forger) (baptised 1776–1812), English forger
- William James Booth (born 1951), American political scientist and political philosopher at Vanderbilt University
- Bill Booth (born 1946), American aviator and inventor
- Billy Booth (actor) (1949–2006), American child actor on the TV series Dennis the Menace

== See also ==
- William Booth Wecker (1892–1969), American entertainer
