= Jack Booth =

Australian rules footballer

Personal information
- Full name: John William Booth
- Nickname: Boothy
- Born: 24 April 1918; Brunswick, Victoria
- Died: 25 December 1999 (aged 81)
- Original team: Prahran
- Height: 170 cm (5 ft 7 in)
- Weight: 70 kg (154 lb)

Playing career^{1}
Years	Club	Games (Goals)
1943–44	St Kilda	14 (2)
1945	Prahran (VFA)	2 (1)
- ^{1} Playing statistics correct to the end of 1945.

John William Booth (24 April 1918 – 25 December 1999) was an Australian rules footballer who played with St Kilda in the Victorian Football League (VFL).

The son of Harold Harding Booth (1886–1964) and Susan Clara Pearl Booth, née Flowers (1891–1960), John William Booth was born at Brunswick on 24 April 1918.
