= Christopher Ragan =

Canadian academic and economist (born 1962)

Christopher "Chris" Ragan
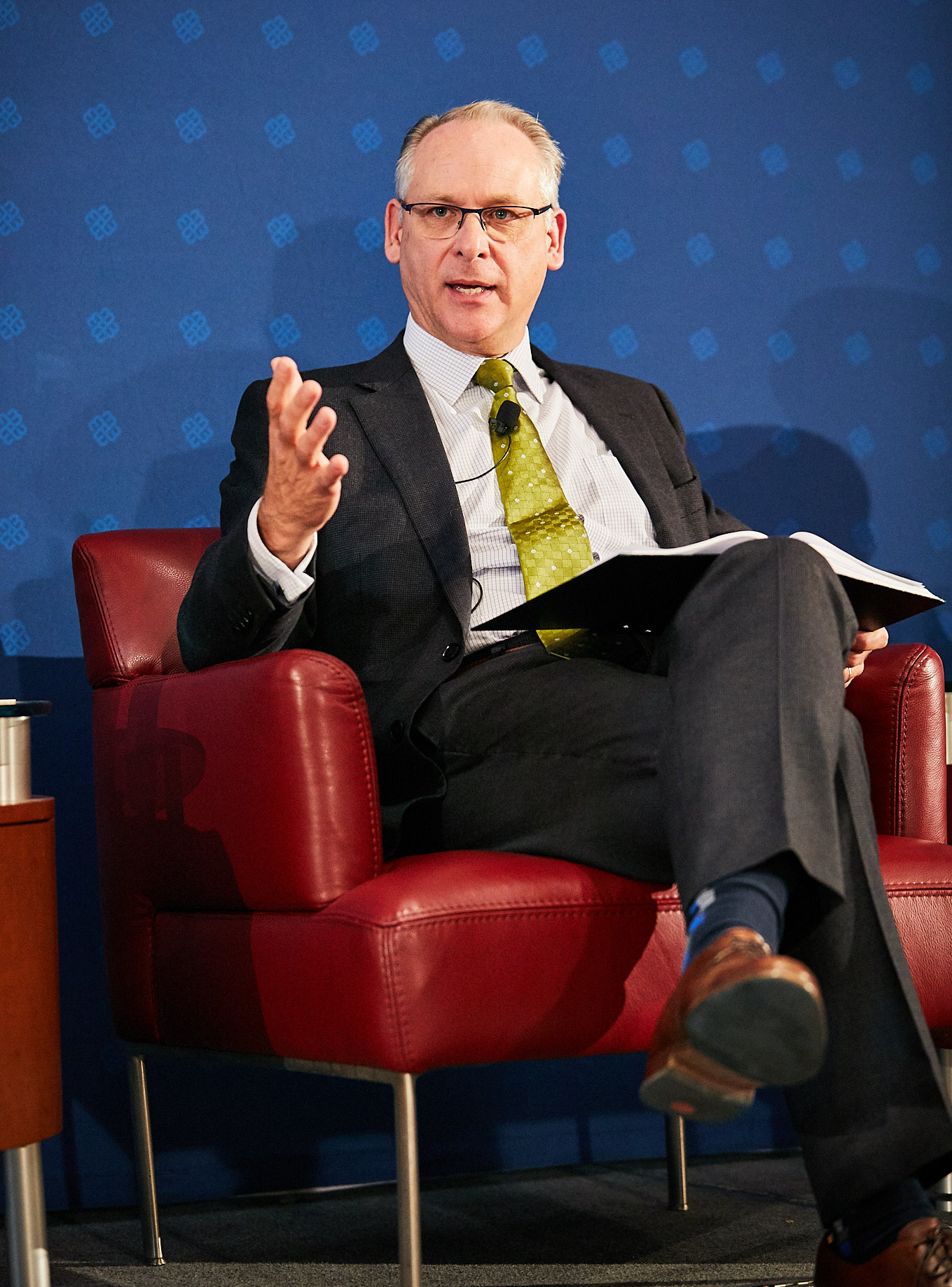
- Born: August 7, 1962 (age 64)

Academic background
- Education: University of Victoria, Queen's University, Massachusetts Institute of Technology

Academic work
- Discipline: Economics
- Institutions: McGill University

Christopher Thomas Southgate Ragan (born August 7, 1962) is a Canadian academic and economist. He has published extensive research on macroeconomics and monetary policy. Ragan is the inaugural director of McGill University's Max Bell School of Public Policy, where he also teaches core macroeconomic and microeconomic policy courses. He is the former chair of Canada's Ecofiscal Commission, a group of Canadian economists that sought to broaden the discussion of environmental pricing reform beyond the academic sphere and into the realm of practical policy application.

== Background ==
Born on August 7, 1962, he received a Bachelor of Arts degree in 1984 from the University of Victoria, a Master of Arts degree from Queen's University in 1985, and a Ph.D. in economics from M.I.T. in 1990.

== Academic work ==
Ragan is an associate professor at McGill University, where he has been on the faculty since 1989. Throughout his tenure, he has taught a wide range of economics courses, both at the undergraduate and graduate levels. In 2007, he became the first in the Faculty of Economics to receive the H. Noel Fieldhouse teaching award for excellence in teaching.

His research and academic writing are largely focused on Canadian public policy challenges, and since 2007, the policy responses to the 2008 financial crisis. His area of focus has been macroeconomic policy, especially monetary policy. Since 2014 (with the Ecofiscal Commission) he has also focused on the case for carbon pricing and the many details necessary to make it both an effective and cost-effective policy to reduce greenhouse-gas emissions.

He is also the author of an introductory textbook in economics, published by Pearson Canada. Previously co-authored by Richard Lipsey (and Douglas Purvis and Gordon Sparks even earlier), Ragan is now the sole author on this textbook, which after 16 editions continues to be the most widely used intro textbook in Canada.

On November 7, 2017, Ragan was announced as the inaugural director of McGill University's Max Bell School of Public Policy. He was tasked with recruiting faculty members for the school, creating its public engagement programs, and designing the curriculum for its flagship Master of Public Policy program.

== Policy appointments ==
From 2004 to 2005, Ragan was the Special Advisor to the Governor of the Bank of Canada, and from 2009 to 2010 he was the Clifford Clark Visiting Economist at Finance Canada.

From 2010 to 2013, Ragan held the David Dodge Chair in Monetary Policy at the C.D. Howe Institute, a Toronto-based public policy think tank. Previously, he served as a member of the C.D. Howe Institute's Monetary Policy Council.

From 2016 to 2019, Ragan was a member of the Advisory Council on Economic Growth, which advised Canadian Finance Minister Bill Morneau on economic policies to achieve long-term sustainable growth.

== In the media ==
From 1996 to 2000, he was Editor-in-Chief of World Economic Affairs. He has also been a columnist for numerous publications, including the National Post, the Montreal Gazette, the National Post Magazine, and most recently The Globe and Mail.
