= Hope Booth =

Canadian-born vaudeville, burlesque, and theatre actress

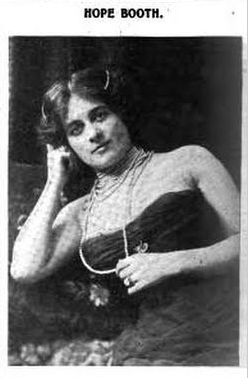
Hope Booth, from a 1910 publication.

Hope Booth (1878 − December 15, 1933) was a Canadian vaudeville, burlesque, and theatre actress.

== Life ==
Booth was born in Toronto and was the daughter of William Beresford Hope, who was a member of the Canadian parliament for South Ontario. Her first marriage was to James A. B. Earll. After her second marriage, to Renold Wolf, a drama critic, in Yonkers, New York on February 4, 1903, she changed her name to "Hope Booth Wolf." She toured with the companies of Daniel Frohman and Mrs. Fiske, appearing in "The Little Blond Lady", a piece by George M. Cohan. She went to Europe in 1905, and in 1909 was in Italy in a sanatorium, unable to return to the U.S. until friends sent money for the return trip. She divorced Mr. Wolf in 1910 on the grounds of "abandonment". According to a press report, dated on December 28, 1909, from Gilliams Press Syndicate: "Mr. Wolf abandoned his wife in August of 1909. Mrs. Wolf says her husband's income was at least $16,000 a year. On January 3, 1910, she asked for an order compelling Mr. Wolf to pay her $250.00 per week alimony and $500.00 counsel fee.

She died at the Monroe Hotel, on 23rd St and Third Avenue in New York, where she reportedly had not left her room for years. She was living there with Lawrence W. Thomas, her third husband.

By all accounts Hope Booth had a remarkable career in vaudeville, spanning at least 15 years (from 1893-1909). Hope Booth appeared on the cover of the New England Home Magazine in August 1893, during the height of her career.

However, she was not without her various detractors. The Encyclopedia of Musical Theatre once described her as "aggressively untalented".
