= Harry Booth (rugby league) =

English rugby league footballer

Personal information
- Full name: Harry Booth

Playing information
- Position: Prop
Club
Years	Team	Pld	T	G	FG	P
Jan 1919–Apr 23	Wakefield Trinity	28	0	0	0	0

Harry Booth was a professional rugby league footballer who played in the 1910s and 1920s. He played at club level for Wakefield Trinity, as a prop.

== Notable tour matches ==
Harry Booth played at prop in Wakefield Trinity's 3–29 defeat by Australia in the 1921–22 Kangaroo tour of Great Britain match at Belle Vue, Wakefield on Saturday 22 October 1921, in front of a crowd of 6,000.
