= Philip Booth =

Philip Booth may refer to:

- Philip Booth (bass) (born 1942), American opera singer
- Philip Booth (economist) (born 1964), British economist
- Philip Booth (poet) (1925–2007), American poet and educator
- Phil Booth (basketball) (born 1995), American basketball player
- Sir Philip Booth, 2nd Baronet (1907–1960), British aristocrat, and television director and producer in California
- Phil Booth, national co-ordinator of the NO2ID campaign against ID cards in the United Kingdom
