= John Booth (Australian footballer) =

Australian rules footballer

Personal information
- Full name: John Albert Booth
- Born: 29 July 1942 (age 84)
- Original team: Doutta Stars
- Height: 180 cm (5 ft 11 in)
- Weight: 80 kg (176 lb)
- Position: Half-back

Playing career^{1}
Years	Club	Games (Goals)
1963	Essendon	2 (0)
1965–67	Fitzroy	46 (16)
1968–69	Port Melbourne (VFA)	
1969–71	Brunswick (VFA)	
- ^{1} Playing statistics correct to the end of 1967.

John Albert Booth (born 29 July 1942) is a former Australian rules footballer who played with Essendon and Fitzroy in the Victorian Football League (VFL). He later played with Port Melbourne and Brunswick in the Victorian Football Association (VFA).
