= Edward Jones (canon of Windsor) =

English Anglican priest (1653–1737)

Revd Edward Jones, DD (1653 – 10 June 1737), an Anglican clergyman from the late Stuart period until the Georgian era, was a long-serving Canon of Windsor (1684 – 1737).

== Family ==
Dr Jones was the fourth son of Sir Thomas Jones, Chief Justice of the Common Pleas and Jane Bavand, daughter of Alderman Daniel Bavand, of Chester.

He married Katherine Fulham, daughter of Revd Dr Edward Fulham, and widow of Robert Waith, of Compton, Surrey (died 1720).

His daughter, Katherine Booth, had an only child, Katherine Tyrwhitt, from whom descend the present Barons Berners.

== Career ==
Educated at Emmanuel College, Cambridge, Jones graduated BA in 1675, matriculating MA in 1678, before receiving a DD in 1720. He was elected a Fellow of his college from 1677 and taught at Cambridge until 1682.

Ordained on 29 May 1681 by the Bishop of London, following the appointment of Very Revd Dr Gregory Hascard as Dean of Windsor, he became Canon of the Third Stall of Windsor in 1684, which post he held until his death.

Canon Jones also served as:

- Domestic Chaplain to Lord Guilford, until 1685
- Rector of Hodnet, until 1702
- Vicar of Brithdir, 1682 – 1705
- Chancellor of the St David's Cathedral, 1713 – 1723
- Chancellor of St Paul's Cathedral, 1723 – 1733.

== See also ==
- Baron Berners
- Tyrwhitt baronets
- Canons of Windsor
