= Pink booth =

Booth offering services for women

A pink booth is a booth offering services and protection to women. They are found in some Indian cities and are run by police.

== Services ==
The Delhi Police launched their Pink Booth Initiative in October 2021, with their booths, staffed by female police officers and launched in areas with high foot traffic, aiming to provide a safe space to access police services such as reporting harassment. Pink booths installed in 2021 in Chamarajanagar provided COVID-19 vaccinations. In 2024, Ghaziabad announced an initiative to have their pink booths staffed by four-person counseling teams to help resolve familial disputes.

=== Elections ===
In 2019, 17 pink booths were set up in the National Capital Region for elections, with 16,683 voters registering to vote at the booths.

== Reception ==
Ghaziabad commissioner of police Ajay Kumar Mishra credited declines in crimes against women in the city from September 2022 to August 2023 to the introduction of pink booths.

A 2025 cover story by Delhi newspaper The Patriot found that many pink booths in the city were barely operational or closed, claiming that "the widespread failure of pink booths across Delhi raises serious concerns about their effectiveness."
