= Booth State Scenic Corridor =

State Park in Lake County, Oregon

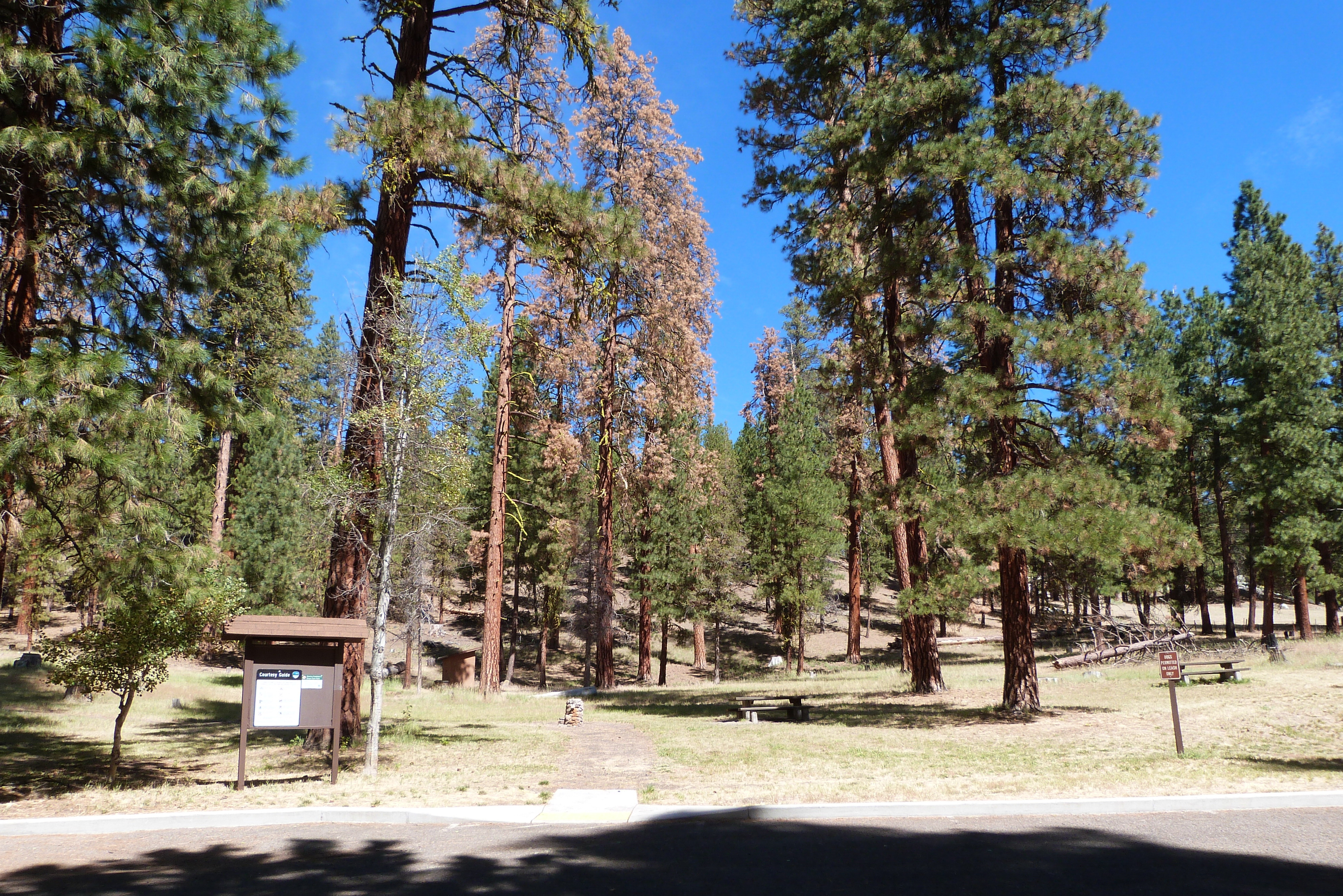

- Location within Oregon Location within the United States
- Interactive map of Booth State Scenic Corridor
- Type: Public, state
- Location: Lake County, Oregon
- Nearest city: Lakeview
- Coordinates: 42°11′20″N 120°34′54″W
- Area: 318.6 acres (128.9 ha)
- Created: 1928
- Operator: Oregon Parks and Recreation Department

Booth State Scenic Corridor (also known as Booth State Wayside or Booth State Park) is a state park in the U.S. state of Oregon, administered by the Oregon Parks and Recreation Department.

== History ==
Booth State Scenic Corridor was created from properties acquired by the State of Oregon between 1928 and 1944. The original 50 acres (20 ha) property gift came from Robert A. Booth, who was president of the Oregon Land and Live Stock Company and former chairman of the Oregon Highway Commission. Booth deeded the land to the state on 3 October 1928. Over the years, additional land was incorporated into the scenic corridor. Today, the wayside corridor includes 318.6 acres (128.9 ha). The land is located in eight parcels along Oregon Route 140, approximately 12 miles (19 km) west of Lakeview, Oregon.

The scenic corridor was developed in the 1930s with the help of the Civilian Conservation Corps. During that period, a wayside picnic area and six camp sites was built along with an access road and a small parking area. Today vault toilets have been added and overnight camping has been discontinued. As of 2013, the annual day-use count was approximately 14,080 visitors per year.

== Environment ==
The scenic corridor land in covered with medium density conifer forests, predominantly ponderosa pine and western juniper. Wildlife in the area includes mule deer, coyotes, and cougars.

== See also ==
- List of Oregon state parks
