= William Booth (footballer) =

English footballer

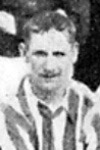
Booth c.1900

William Booth (born October 1880) was an English footballer. His regular position was as a forward. Born in Stockport, he played for Manchester United and Edge Lane.

Transferring from Edge Lane in December 1900, Booth made two appearances as a forward for Manchester United, on 26 and 29 December 1900, aged 20. The 26 December match against Blackpool resulted in a 4–0 win for United, while the 29 December match against Glossop North End resulted in a 3–0 win for United.

Booth transferred from Manchester United in June 1901.
