= Annette Verschuren =

Canadian business executive

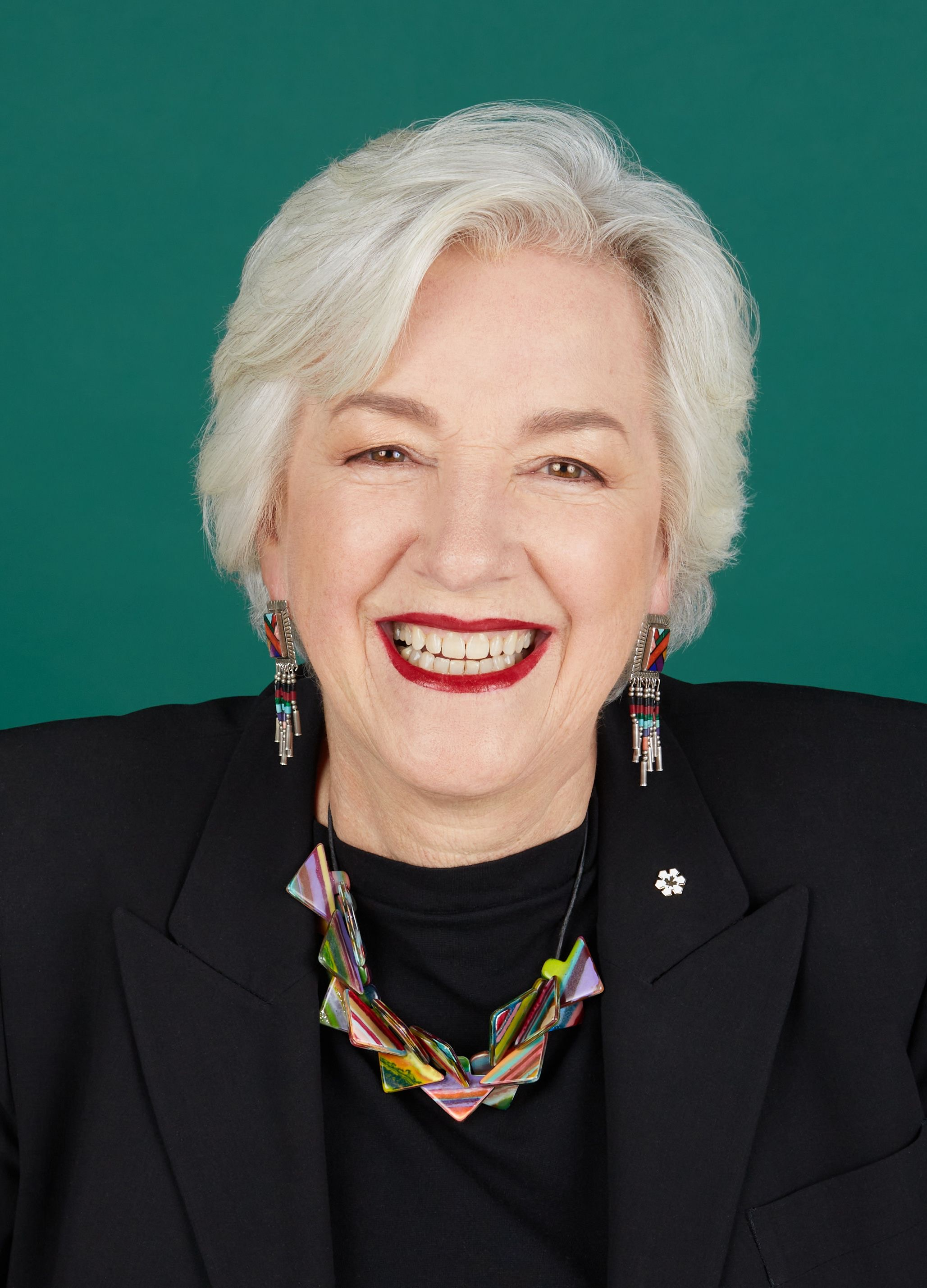
- Born: North Sydney, Nova Scotia
- Occupations: Chair & CEO of NRStor Inc.
- Known for: President of The Home Depot Canada and Asia
- Awards: Order of Canada

Annette Verschuren, OC is a Canadian business executive. She is the chair & CEO of NRStor Inc., an energy storage development company.

In 1992, Verschuren brought Michaels, a chain of arts and craft stores, to Canada and oversaw the opening of 17 stores across Canada. She then became President of The Home Depot Canada in 1996 and oversaw the expansion from 19 stores to 179 stores at the end of her tenure in 2011, increasing revenue from $600 million to $6 billion.

In 2011, Verschuren founded the Verschuren Centre, named after her Dutch immigrant parents. The Centre is an independent clean technology development and deployment facility in Nova Scotia, Canada. The Centre's purpose is to commercialize innovative technologies and businesses, particularly in the fields of the environment, clean energy and sustainability in Canada.

In May 2011, Verschuren was awarded the Officer of the Order of Canada for her contributions to the retail industry and corporate social responsibility. In 2019, Verschuren was inducted into the Canadian Business Hall of Fame, the first woman from Atlantic Canada to receive this honour.

Verschuren was born in North Sydney, Cape Breton, Nova Scotia in 1956. She spent her childhood on a family-owned dairy farm in the region, before heading to St. Francis Xavier University in Antignonish, Nova Scotia in 1974. Verschuren graduated from university and began her first job as a development officer at the Cape Breton Development Corporation, a Crown Corporation. In 1986, Verschuren left the province and moved to Toronto, where she quickly became a woman in leadership.

== Business Career & Retail Leadership ==
Imasco

In 1989, Verschuren began a job with Imasco Ltd., one of Canada’s largest holding companies, as their Vice President of Corporate Development. She went on to run a part of their retail operations, including Den for Men, before leaving the company in 1992.

Michaels Canada

In 1992, Verschuren brought Michaels to Canada and assumed the position of President of Michaels Canada, North America’s largest arts and crafts store. In the following 26 months, Verschuren oversaw the opening of 17 stores across Canada.

Home Depot Canada

In 1996, Verschuren left Michaels to become President of Home Depot Canada, a home improvement and renovation retailer. Verschuren oversaw the expansion of Home Depot in Canada from 19 stores in 1996 to 179 stores at the end of her tenure in 2011, increasing revenue from $600 million to over $6 billion in that period. As of 2024, Home Depot is Canada’s largest home improvement retailer with 182 stores in 10 Canadian provinces, employing more than 30,000 associates from coast to coast.

Verschuren also led Home Depot’s entry into China from 2005 to 2008, as the company purchased Chinese home improvement company Home Way and its 12 stores within the country.

NRStor

In 2012, Verschuren founded NRStor Incorporated, an energy storage company that builds, owns and operates energy storage projects that deliver grid services. As Chair & CEO, her role is to accelerate the commercialization of energy storage technologies through the planning and development of energy storage projects worldwide and to encourage a clean energy future.

One example is the Oneida Energy Storage project in partnership with Six Nations of the Grand River Development Corporation, Northland Power, Aecon & Mississaugas of the Credit First Nation. Oneida launched May 7, 2025 and is the largest grid-scale battery energy storage facility in operation in Canada and the fourth largest globally.

Verschuren drew on her experience in retail to inform her subsequent work in clean technology and sustainability.

== Awards & Recognition ==
Canada 125 Media

Verschuren was awarded the 125th Anniversary of the Confederation of Canada Medal in 1992 for her contributions to Canadian business. The medal was awarded to those making a significant contribution to their fellow citizens, their community, or to Canada.

Distinguished Canadian Retailer of the Year

Awarded to Verschuren in 2005 by the Retail Council of Canada. The Distinguished Canadian Retailer of the Year Award recognizes a retail leader who has led their company to outstanding business success and innovation, and who has consistently demonstrated community commitment and support.

Verschuren was awarded Outstanding Business Leader of the Year in 2006 by Wilfrid Laurier University, and Communicator of the Year in 2007 by the International Association of Business Communicators’ (IABC) Toronto chapter.

Officer of the Order of Canada

On May 26, 2011, Verschuren was honoured as an Officer of The Order of Canada for her contribution to the retail industry and corporate social responsibility.

Living Planet Legacy Award

Awarded to Verschuren in 2012 by the World Wildlife Foundation for her work as President of Home Depot Canada and impact certified forest products.

Business Council of Canada

Verschuren joined the Business Council of Canada, a national business advocacy organization representing the interests of Canada’s leading companies and entrepreneurs. Verschuren was a member of the Business Council of Canada (BCC) from 2000-2011.

Canadian Business Hall of Fame

In 2019, Verschuren was the first woman from Atlantic Canada to be inducted into the Canadian Business Hall of Fame. The Canadian Business Hall of Fame was established by JA Canada in 1979 to honour Canada's pre-eminent business leaders for their professional and philanthropic achievements.

Board Memberships

Verschuren is a board member of Liberty Mutual, Air Canada, Saputo Inc. and Canadian Natural Resources Limited (CNRL). In addition, Ms. Verschuren is the Chair of the MaRS Discovery District Board. Ms. Verschuren is on the board of the Ontario Energy Association.

Chancellor, Cape Breton University

In 2004, Verschuren was installed as Chancellor of Cape Breton University. From 2004 to 2025, she supported and led capital campaigns, including the one which saw the creation of her parents namesake building, the Verschuren Centre for Sustainability in Energy and the Environment.

Verschuren Centre for Sustainability in Energy and the Environment

In 2008, Verschuren led a funding drive to build a Sustainability in Energy and the Environment centre which opened in November 2011. Later named the Verschuren Centre, it is a registered not-for-profit research, development and demonstration facility providing contracted services to industry and community in the areas of bio-processing, marine processing, carbon transformation, bioplastics, energy storage and sustainable resource use. Today, the Centre is working with more than 40 companies to develop innovative new bioeconomy and green energy solutions.

MaRS Discovery District (MaRS) - Chair of the Board

May 18, 2018, Verschuren was appointed as Chair of MaRS Discovery District

Smart Prosperity Initiative

In 2016, Verschuren became the co-chair of the Smart Prosperity Leaders’ Initiative, a coalition determined to put Canada's economy on a more productive and environmentally sustainable path. She helped to fund and form a 26-member coalition of CEOs and NGO heads committed to building a more prosperous and sustainable nation.

Centre for Addiction and Mental Health Foundation (CAMH)

Verschuren sat on the CAMH Foundation Board of Directors from 2010 until she left the board in June 2022. She has been a donor to CAMH and the CAMH Foundation since 2015. In June 2022, Verschuren joined the CAMH Foundation Visionary Society. Visionary Society members are those who have committed $1 million or more to lead change for mental health.

Verschuren has received numerous honorary doctorates from Canadian universities, including her alma mater, St. Francis Xavier University.

== Political Activity & Government Advisory Roles ==
Economic Advisory Council

Verschuren was appointed by Minister Flaherty to the Economic Advisory Council in 2008. The Council included Canadian business and academic leaders who provided advice to the Government during the economic crisis in 2008, leading up to the 2009 budget. The group of 11 members provided counsel and aid in responsible leadership for the government periodically on economic matters after the budget was finalized.

Canada-U.S. Council for Advancement of Women Entrepreneurs and Business Leaders

Verschuren, alongside top executives from Canada and the U.S. banded together to kick off an initiative to help growth-minded women entrepreneurs scale up their businesses.

Advisory Council for NAFTA/USMCA

Verschuren was one of 13 members of the NAFTA advisory council created in 2017. The members of the council aided and advised on the trilateral trade deal and provided a unified, non-partisan approach to the Team Canada negotiations.

=== SDTC ===
In 2019, Verschuren was appointed by the Canadian federal government to be Chairperson of the Board of Directors for Sustainable Development Technology Canada (SDTC), a foundation created by the federal government of Canada in 2001 to fund new clean technologies.

Prior to Verschuren’s appointment to SDTC in June 2019, she disclosed to the government that she continued on the board of the Verschuren Centre, which she founded, and chaired the MaRS Discovery District board and remained Chair, CEO, and majority shareholder of NRStor Inc., a company she founded. It was alleged that Ms. Verschuren was in a conflict of interest when she participated in two types of SDTC funding decisions.

The Verschuren Report was a report by the Office of the Conflict of Interest and Ethics Commissioner examining decisions made by Ms. Verschuren during her tenure as Chairperson of the SDTC. The Conflict of Interest and Ethics Commissioner Konrad von Finckenstein found that Ms. Verschuren failed to comply with some provisions of the Conflict of Interest Act during her tenure. The Commissioner found that Verschuren did not use her position as Chairperson of SDTC to try to influence other Board members in decisions in question and the Commissioner was quoted as saying, “It was clear that Ms. Verschuren took what she believed to be the right steps to manage her conflicts of interest. However, she did not meet the Act's requirements.”

Verschuren announced on 19 November 2023 that she would voluntarily step away from the SDTC to safeguard the organization's standing and to allow the board move forward on recommended changes effective 1 December 2023.

In the fall of 2023, the government suspended SDTC from funding new projects following a third-party investigation into allegations from former SDTC employees.

=== Author ===
In April 2016, Verschuren published her first book, Bet On Me: Leading and Succeeding in Business and in Life, with HarperCollins (Harper-Collins, 2017; ISBN 9781443437592). The book became a national bestseller in Canada and was a finalist for the National Business Book Award.
