= Paul Booth (rugby) =

English rugby union player

- Full name: Paul Booth
- Born: 1865 Wakefield district, England
- Died: 1914 (aged 49) Wakefield district, England

Rugby union career
Senior career
Years	Team	Apps	(Points)
–	Wakefield Trinity		
–	Yorkshire		

Paul Booth (1865 – 1914) was an English rugby union footballer who played in the 1880s. He played at representative level for Yorkshire, and at club level for Wakefield Trinity (who were a rugby union club at the time). Prior to Tuesday 27 August 1895, Wakefield Trinity was a rugby union club.
