= Putney, Connecticut =

Coordinates: 41°14′06″N 73°06′42″W

Putney is a section in the north end of Stratford, Connecticut. The area includes Boothe Memorial Park and Museum and Putney Chapel (built c. 1844) and abuts the neighborhood of Oronoque. The area roughly includes all property from Chapel Street and Harry B. Flood Middle School across Connecticut Route 110 and the park to the River Road and Housatonic River.
