= Mount Booth =

Mountain in Ross Dependency, Antarctica

Mount Booth (77°26′S 161°46′E) is a peak, 1,575 metres (5,170 ft) high, surmounting the junction of mountain ridges at the southwest end of Murphy Valley in the Olympus Range, McMurdo Dry Valleys. It was named by the Advisory Committee on Antarctic Names in 2004 after John F. (Johan) Booth, a science technician who wintered eight times at the United States Antarctic Program Palmer Station and South Pole Station between 1994 and 2004.

The above paragraph was taken from the USGS Geographic Names Information System (GNIS) as written when Mount Booth was originally named in January 2004. This database is currently offline. As of 2022, Johan Booth (who died on 29 June 2022) had wintered in Antarctica a total of 20 times — six times at Palmer Station between 1994 and 2004, and 14 times at the South Pole Station between 1995 and 2020.
