= Armored booth =

An armored booth, armored guardhouse, or security booth is a small structure furnished with a chair, and security cameras. Guards often sit inside of the structure, which has bulletproof and blast resistant windows, doors, and walls. Such booths are generally found at embassies, important government buildings and structures, military installations, and high-end hotels in some countries. NATO and other military organizations have obtained the booths to serve as guard posts at their military installations around the world.

== Design ==
Armored booths are designed to be blast resistant, bulletproof. Though their amenities differ, some have higher levels of security including blast proof ventilation, emergency evacuation systems, and floodlights. Armored booths are generally air conditioned, and often come fitted with gun ports, air filtration, washrooms, kitchens, beds, or anything else a client can dream up.

While similar to non-armored sentry booths, in that they generally have the same rectangular prism shape, the booths are generally built with much stronger materials. They are also designed to withstand a variety of situations beyond those a traditional sentry booth would face.

== Popularity and manufacturers ==
Armored booths started to gain popularity in the late 1970s, with renewed and increased interest after the September 11 attacks in New York City. United States consular posts and embassies around the world installed the booths.
