= Demico Boothe =

American writer

Demico Boothe is an African-American bestselling author of several books on the plight of African-American men in the American prison system. Boothe's book Why Are So Many Black Men in Jail? addresses the issue of racism in the Crack versus Cocaine Laws and was published in 2007, three years before Michelle Alexander's better-known book that also addresses the subject, The New Jim Crow (2010). Why Are So Many Black Men in Prison? is on the Black Lives Matter recommended reading list.

== Biography ==
Boothe was born in Memphis, Tennessee, and grew up partly in his mother's home in the Castalia Heights Projects in South Memphis, and partly at his father's home, in a part of Memphis that was originally “residential, crime-free” but that degenerated during Boothe's teen years when Crip gang members started inducting young neighborhood men into the drug trade. In addition, Boothe's father, who had previously made a good living in business, developed a crack cocaine habit and began spending all his money on the drug. Boothe started working two part-time jobs, but his father demanded the earnings so he could buy drugs.

Boothe had always hoped to go to college. By the time he was finishing high school and determining how he could finance a college degree, his father had entered a drug rehabilitation program but was still in too much debt due to his previous drug habit to help Boothe out financially. In addition, Boothe's younger brother was making large amounts of money selling cocaine. Boothe then made the decision to engage in cocaine sales in order to make enough money to pay for his college fees.

After six months of selling, at the age of 18, Boothe was arrested (on a first-time charge) and sentenced to ten years in prison for "possession with intent to distribute over 50 grams of crack cocaine." At that time, crack cocaine sentences were 100 times longer than for selling powder cocaine. A major theme of his book Why Are So Many Black Men in Prison? is this sentencing disparity, which Boothe blames on racism.

After serving eight years and ten months in various prisons, Boothe was released. He was determined to stay out of prison but, six months after his release, was re-arrested when he unknowingly drove a friend to a rendezvous to buy counterfeit money. The friend promised to testify that Boothe had known nothing about the counterfeit money, but upon being repeatedly warned and pressured by both his counsel and the judge, the friend decided not to testify after all. The friend's mother did testify to Boothe's innocence, but the jury still convicted Boothe to another 46 months in prison.

During this second prison stint, Boothe set out to educate himself as part of an overall plan to prepare himself for life outside and to do all he could to make sure he never did time again.

Altogether, Boothe spent nearly 13 years in federal prison and was released in 2003. He wrote his first book, entitled Why Are So Many Black Men in Prison?, while incarcerated. To date, he has written and published three other books, including: Getting Out & Staying Out: A Black Man's Guide to Success After Prison and The Top 25 Things Black Folks Do That We Need To Stop!!! The latter was published in January 2009, and received much critical acclaim within the African-American community.

== Career ==
Boothe is a noted expert on many subjects and issues concerning the African-American community, with an emphasis on the U.S. criminal justice system as it relates to black males.

Besides addressing the issue of anti-black racism in the legal and prison system, Boothe is an advocate for education and lifelong learning. He notes, for example, that the black men he met in prison were very badly educated.

On the back of his book, Why Are So Many Black Men in Prison?, Boothe states that, while he was incarcerated, he read and studied over 500 books, including the entire Webster's Dictionary, the Bible, the Qur'an, as well as every alphabetical entry in the 1998 Encyclopædia Britannica.

Boothe also advocates taking a pragmatic approach to avoiding the "school to prison pipeline". In his 2012 book, Getting Out and Staying Out: A Black Man's Guide to Success After Prison, he suggests "taking full control and responsibility of yourself and your actions from that point on, despite any injustices or wrongful actions that may have been committed against you by the system." Other suggestions are, as above, embarking on a serious reading program while still in prison, and when out, developing an entrepreneurial work style, and growing, fostering, and maintaining a committed, supportive relationship and permanent family unit.

== Works ==
- Why Are So Many Black Men in Prison? (Full Surface Publishing, 2007, ISBN 978-0-9792953-0-0)
- The Top 25 Things Black Folks Do that We Need to Stop!!! (2009)
- Getting Out & Staying Out: A Black Man's Guide to Success after Prison (Full Surface Publishing, 2012, ISBN 978-0-9792953-5-5)
- The U.S. Child Support System and the Black Family (2018)
