= Stephen Booth =

Stephen Booth or Steve Booth may refer to:

- Stephen Booth (academic) (1933–2020), American academic
- Stephen Booth (writer) (born 1952), English crime-writer
- Stephen Booth (cricketer) (born 1963), English cricketer

== See also ==
- Stefan Booth (born 1979), English actor and singer
