= Booth Homestead =

Historic house in Ohio, United States

- U.S. National Register of Historic Places
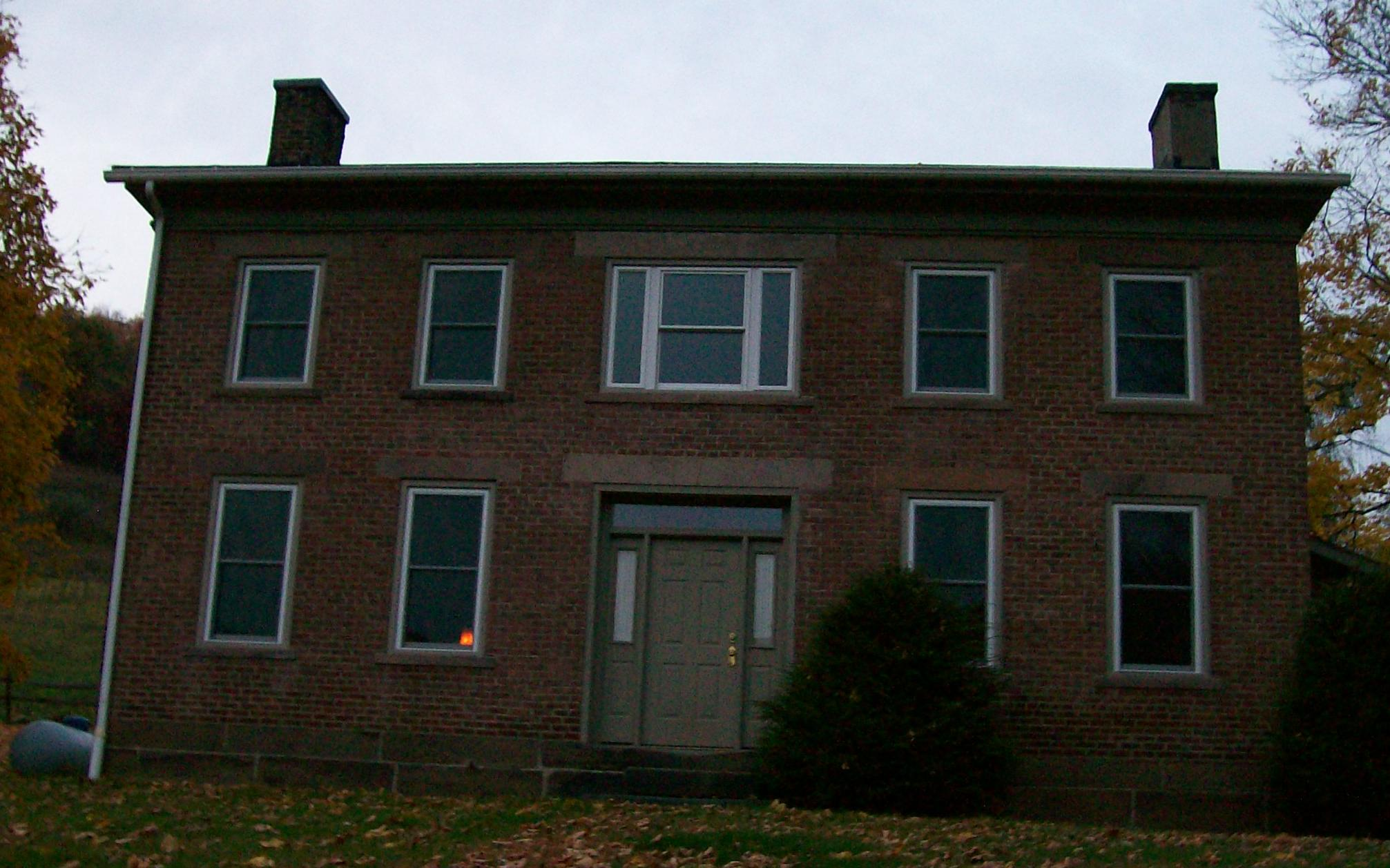
- The Booth Homestead in 2009

- Location within Ohio Location within the United States
- Nearest city: Guernsey, Ohio
- Coordinates: 40°12′23″N 81°34′37″W
- Area: 12 acres (4.9 ha)
- Built: 1849
- Architect: James Booth
- NRHP reference No.: 79001851
- Added to NRHP: September 6, 1979

The Booth Homestead, also called the Booth Home Place, is located at 8433 Wheeling Township Road in Guernsey County, Ohio, United States. Named a historic site in 1979, it was built for one of the area's largest landowners.

While young, James Booth emigrated from England to Coshocton County, where he settled in the vicinity of Newcomerstown. In 1843, aged eighteen, Booth arranged for the construction of the present house; he may have done the work himself, or he may simply have paid for the labor of others. Booth's design mixed traditional building styles with influences from the popular Greek Revival style of architecture. Shaped like the letter "L", the house possesses a facade divided into five bays, of which the middle contains the main entrance.

James Booth was among Guernsey County's leading landowners; at his peak, he was possessed of more than 700 acres (280 ha). Upon Booth's death, his heirs shared his property between themselves at 120 acres (0.49 km^{2}) apiece, with his son Milton Booth inheriting the homestead. He managed the property until his premature death in 1907, when it passed to his sister Mary Jane and her husband Jasper Little. Several years later the property came into the possession of Frank Booth, a grandson of James Booth. It remained in his hands until his death in the 1970s, when it passed out of the family.

In 1979, the Booth Homestead was listed on the National Register of Historic Places, qualifying because of its historically significant architecture. Critical to this designation was its design's employment of both classical motifs and the vernacular architecture of the area.
