= Booths =

High-end supermarket chain in Northern England

E. H. Booth & Co., Limited

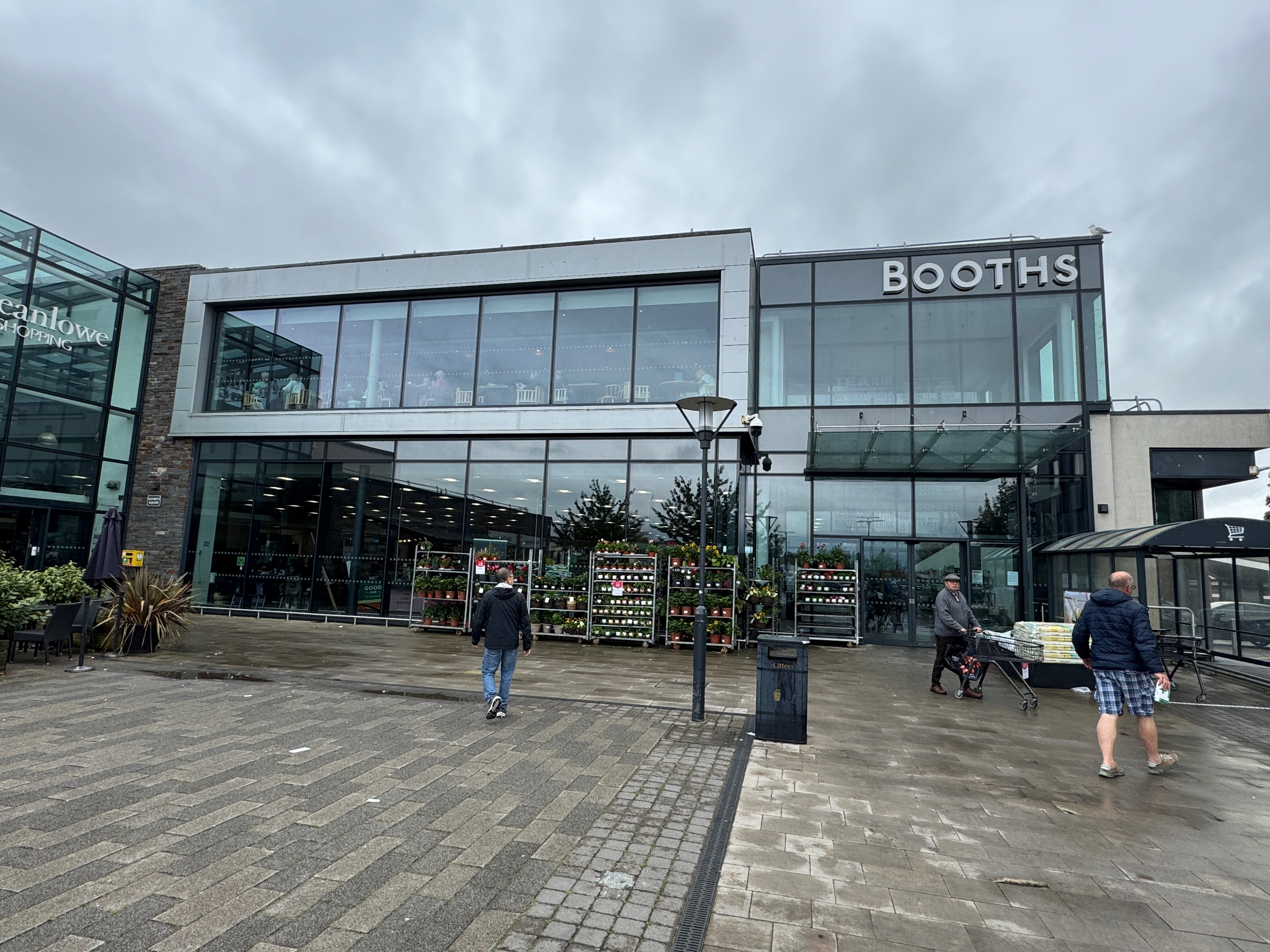
- Booths at Poulton-le-Fylde, Lancashire, 2024
- Trade name: Booths
- Type: Private limited company
- Industry: High-end supermarket
- Founded: 1847; 1896 (incorporated)
- Founder: Edwin Henry Booth
- Headquarters: Ribbleton, Preston, Lancashire, England, UK
- Number of locations: ▼25 retail stores in Northern England
- Area served: Cumbria; Lancashire; Yorkshire; Cheshire
- Key people: Edwin J. Booth (Executive Chairman); Nigel Murray (Managing Director); Ross Faith (Finance Director); Rebecca Hardman (Head of HR); John Gill (Head of Commercial Operations & Marketing)
- Products: Food, beverage & tobacco retailing
- Revenue: ▲£318.65m (2024)
- Operating income: ▲£3.15m (2024)
- Net income: ▲£(1.73m) (2024)
- Owner: Booth Family and staff
- Number of employees: ▲3,242
- Website: booths.co.uk

E. H. Booth & Co., Limited, trading as Booths, is a chain of high-end supermarkets in Northern England. Most of its branches are in Lancashire, but there are also branches in Cheshire, Cumbria, North Yorkshire and West Yorkshire. It has been described as the "Waitrose of the North" by sources such as The Daily Telegraph.

== History ==
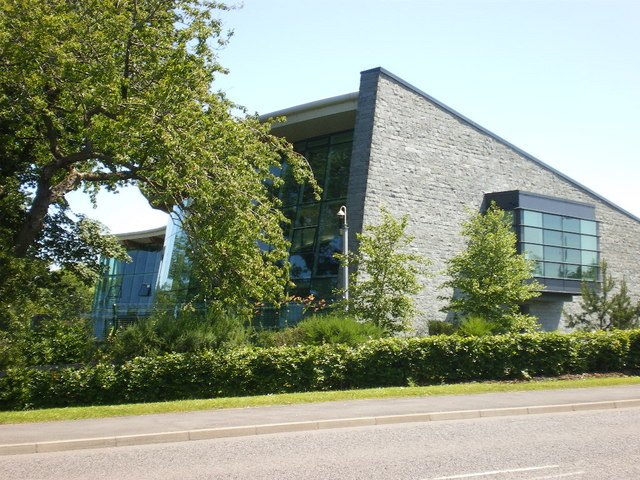
Booths Central Office, Ribbleton, Preston

E. H. Booth & Co. Ltd was founded in June 1847 when 19-year-old tea dealer Edwin Henry Booth opened a shop called the China House in Blackpool. In 1863, he added the sale of wines and spirits, and branches were opened in Lytham in 1879 and Blackburn in 1884. The business was incorporated as a private limited company in 1896.

Edwin's son, John, opened cafes in the stores in 1902 and invited all staff to become shareholders in 1920. It has remained owned by the Booth family and staff ever since, comprising over 250 shareholders in 2011 and with no individual having more than 12% of the total shares. The current chairman, Edwin J. Booth, is the fifth generation.

In June 2005, the current chairman, Edwin J Booth, was awarded the Business in the Community (BITC) Prince of Wales Ambassador Award for North West England. This is given to individuals whose leadership and commitment to responsible business practice and the actions they have taken personally have created a positive impact both inside their company and on the wider society. He was also finalist for the Ernst & Young Master Entrepreneur of the Year (North).

In 2006, Booths achieved second place in the list of the World's Greatest Food Retailers. The panel of top designers, architects, analysts, journalists, suppliers and retailers was brought together by national trade publication, The Grocer, and asked to rank their favourite food retailers from anywhere in the world. They were impressed by the quality of the company's offer, its focus on local sourcing and head for innovation. Simon Bell, retail director of foodservice firm Leathams, voted Booths' Chorley store first above Selfridges in London. He applauds its excellent customer service, knowledge of products and friendly staff.

A new head office was opened in early 2006 in Ribbleton, Preston and includes environmentally friendly features, such as using rainwater to flush the toilets. In 2011, Booths opened two new stores in MediaCityUK, Salford and Penrith, Cumbria. A new Booths store in Milnthorpe opened on 14 November 2012 and one in Barrowford opened on 4 December 2014. A branch opened in July 2015 in Burscough, followed by a store in St Annes in September and the Poulton-le-Fylde store was renovated.

In a feature article in The Guardian in 2008, David Webster, the former chairman and co-founder of Britain's Safeway chain (which had sold out to Morrisons in 2004), said that he had tried to buy out Booths several times over the years, as did several of his rivals: "One thought Booths would have disappeared ages ago but it jolly well hasn't. It is obviously doing an outstanding job for its customers".

In 2008, Booths was under pressure by Waitrose with rumours of a takeover, which was later ruled out. Booths and Waitrose then formed a buying group together.

Booths commissioned Small World Consulting to research its carbon footprint and the resulting report was published in 2012.

In 2015, Booths was named Independent Retail Chain of the Year at The Grocer Gold Awards. As of 11 October 2017, Amazon Fresh sells a range of Booths branded products for home delivery in selected areas.

In November 2017, it was reported that the supermarket had been put up for sale for between £130m and £150m, but this was later dismissed as "speculation" by the firm.

In the 2019 Birthday Honours, Booths' executive chairman Edwin J. Booth was appointed CBE "for services to business and to charity".

In 2021, it was confirmed that the MediaCityUK branch was to close within months due to the impact of the COVID-19 pandemic. After 10 years, it closed for trade in February 2021.

In April 2024, their Hale Barns store closed after nine years, ending their presence in Greater Manchester.

In July 2025, their Ripon store closed after sixteen years, bringing the total number of Booths stores to 26.

== Store list ==
There are 25 stores:

=== Lancashire ===
1. Barrowford
2. Burscough
3. Carnforth
4. Chorley
5. Clitheroe
6. Fulwood, Preston
7. Garstang
8. Hesketh Bank
9. Longridge
10. Longton, Preston
11. Lytham
12. Penwortham
13. Poulton-le-Fylde
14. Scotforth, Lancaster
15. St Annes (town centre shop closed but new, larger store opened)

=== Cumbria ===
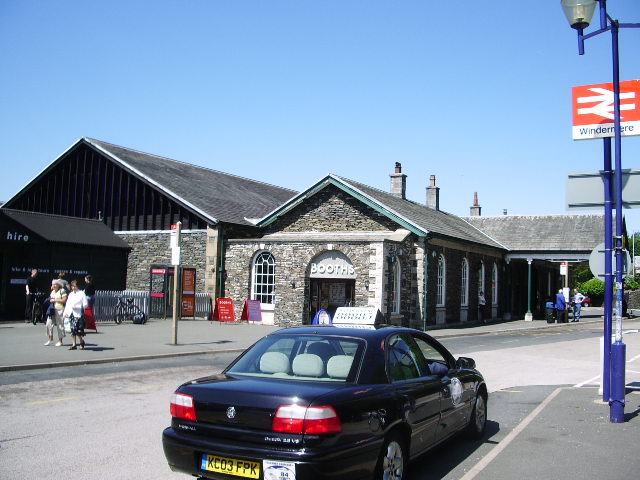
Booths in Windermere

1. Kendal
2. Keswick
3. Kirkby Lonsdale
4. Milnthorpe
5. Penrith
6. Ulverston
7. Windermere

=== Yorkshire ===
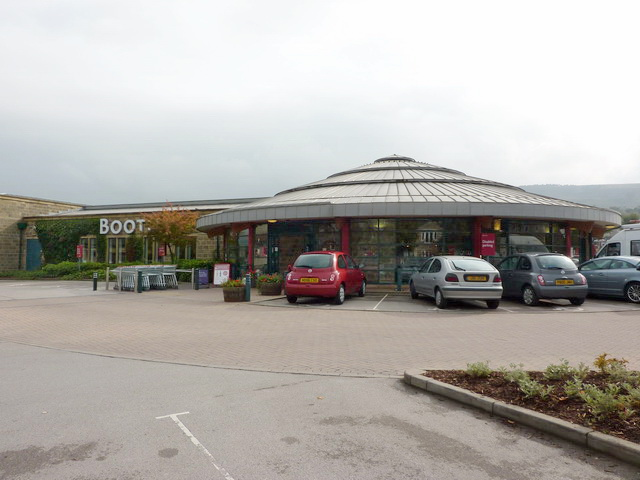
Booths in Ilkley

1. Ilkley
2. Settle

=== Cheshire ===
1. Knutsford

== Fair Milk ==
In May 2014, the store rebranded its own-label milk as Fair Milk, increasing its farm gate milk price to a yearly average of 34.4 pence per litre, and thus paying farmers more for their milk than any other UK supermarket. In 2015, Booths became a finalist in the Responsible Business Awards, organised by the charity Business in the Community (BITC), the UK's longest-running and most respected corporate responsibility awards. Booths was one of only four companies shortlisted in the Samworth Brothers Rural Action Award, which recognises businesses which support rural communities.

== Café 1847 ==
The "artisan" speciality food shop and restaurant is a recent development by Booths. The first one was located at the Kendal store; its range is mainly local produce from small producers.

== See also ==
- List of supermarket chains in the United Kingdom
