= Edwin J. Booth =

English supermarket chairman (born 1955)

Edwin J. Booth CBE DL
- Born: 20 July 1955 (age 69); Preston, Lancashire, UK
- Occupation: Businessman
- Known for: Chairman of Booths

Edwin John Booth CBE DL (born 20 July 1955) is the chairman of British supermarket chain Booths, which was founded in 1847 by his great-great-grandfather Edwin Henry Booth.

He joined Booths in 1973, on leaving school, and became executive chairman in 1997 and chairman and CEO in 2017.

He was chair of the Lancashire local enterprise partnership from 2011 to 2018.

In 2010, Lancaster University awarded him an honorary Doctor of Laws (LLD) degree, describing him as "a highly successful local businessman whose career embodies the skills and values necessary for success in a highly competitive commercial environment".

He was appointed as Deputy Lieutenant (DL) to the Lord Lieutenant of Lancashire in 2005, and was High Sheriff of Lancashire for the year starting in April 2021. In the 2019 New Year Honours, he was appointed Commander of the Order of the British Empire (CBE) "for services to business and charity".

Booth is married and has two daughters.
