= Lusby, Lincolnshire =

Village in the East Lindsey district of Lincolnshire, England

Coordinates: 53.191212°N 0.003420°E

Lusby
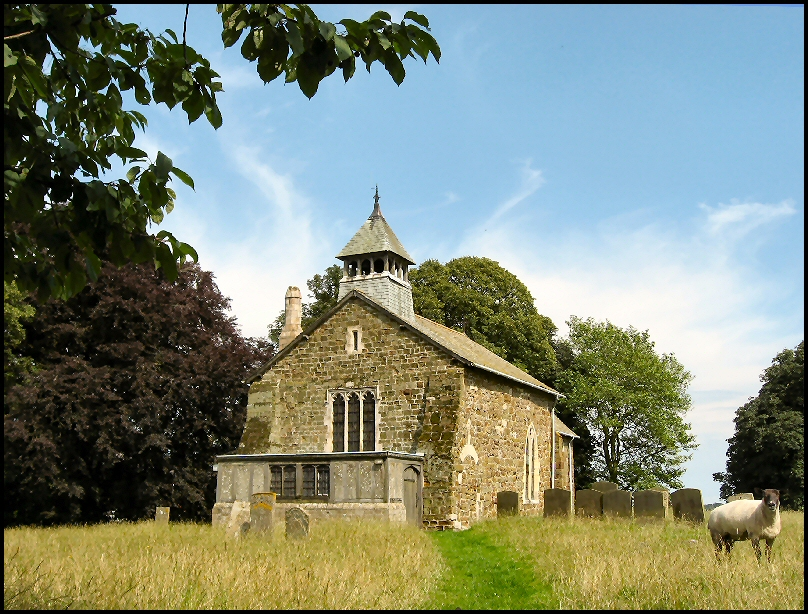
- St Peter's Church, Lusby

- Location within Lincolnshire
- Population: 147 (2011)
- OS grid reference: TF339678
  - London: 115 mi (185 km) S
- Civil parish: Lusby with Winceby
- District: East Lindsey
- Shire county: Lincolnshire
- Region: East Midlands
- Country: England
- Sovereign state: United Kingdom
- Post town: Spilsby
- Postcode district: PE23
- Police: Lincolnshire
- Fire: Lincolnshire
- Ambulance: East Midlands
- UK Parliament: Louth and Horncastle

Lusby is a village and former civil parish, now in the parish of Lusby with Winceby, in the East Lindsey district of Lincolnshire, England. It is situated about 4 miles (6 km) west from Spilsby, and about 5 miles (8 km) east from Horncastle. In 1961 the parish had a population of 68. On 1 April 1987 the parish was abolished to form "Lusby with Winceby". Lusby with Winceby had a population (including Hameringham) of 147 at the 2011 census.

== History ==
In the 1086 Domesday Book, Lusby is listed as "Luzebi", with 26 households, a meadow of 180 acres (0.73 km^{2}), a mill and a church.

The parish church is Grade I-listed and dedicated to St Peter. It is built in greenstone and dates from the 11th century, with 15th-century additions. It was further altered and reduced in 1893 by Ewan Christian, and in the 20th century an porch was added. A late 11th-early 12th-century grave marker is incorporated above the keystone of the blocked south doorway of the nave.

A scion of the parish was the Very Revd Dr Penyston Booth, Dean of Windsor, whose brother served as Rector till 1716.

Lusby CofE School was built as a National School to serve the village as well as nearby Winceby and Asgarby. It closed in 1962.
