= Edwin Henry Booth =

English businessman

- Booth pictured around 1880
- Born: 1828; Bury, Lancashire, England
- Died: 1899 (aged 70–71); Preston, Lancashire, England
- Resting place: Chorley Cemetery, Chorley, Lancashire, England
- Occupation: Businessman
- Known for: founding Booths
- Spouse: Susannah Phillips

Edwin Henry Booth (1828 – January 1899) was an English businessman. Initially a tea dealer, in 1847 he founded E. H. Booth & Co. Ltd, which is still in existence as the Booths supermarket chain.

== Early life and career ==
Booth was born in Bury, Lancashire, in 1828. He was an orphan by the age of eleven, and ran away from home.

In 1847, at the age of nineteen, Booth was able to secure an £80 loan with which to open a shop, named The China House, in Blackpool.

He opened a second shop in 1855 in Chorley.

When UK licensing laws were changed, Booth was able to add wine and liquor to his range of products. The increased profit allowed him to open three additional shops, in Preston (1867), Lytham St Annes (1878) and Blackburn (1884).

His son, John, took over the businesses in 1899, three years after Booths had been incorporated as a private limited company.

As of 2023, Booth's great-great-grandson, Edwin J. Booth, is the company's chairman and chief executive officer.

== Personal life ==
Booth married Susannah Phillips, with whom he had had two sons, John (1857–1941) and Albert (1866–1868), and a daughter, Elizabeth (1855–1858).

== Death ==
Booth died in January 1899, aged 70 or 71. He is buried in Chorley Cemetery in Chorley, Lancashire. His wife survived him by two years, and was buried beside him.
