= Joseph Booth (bishop) =

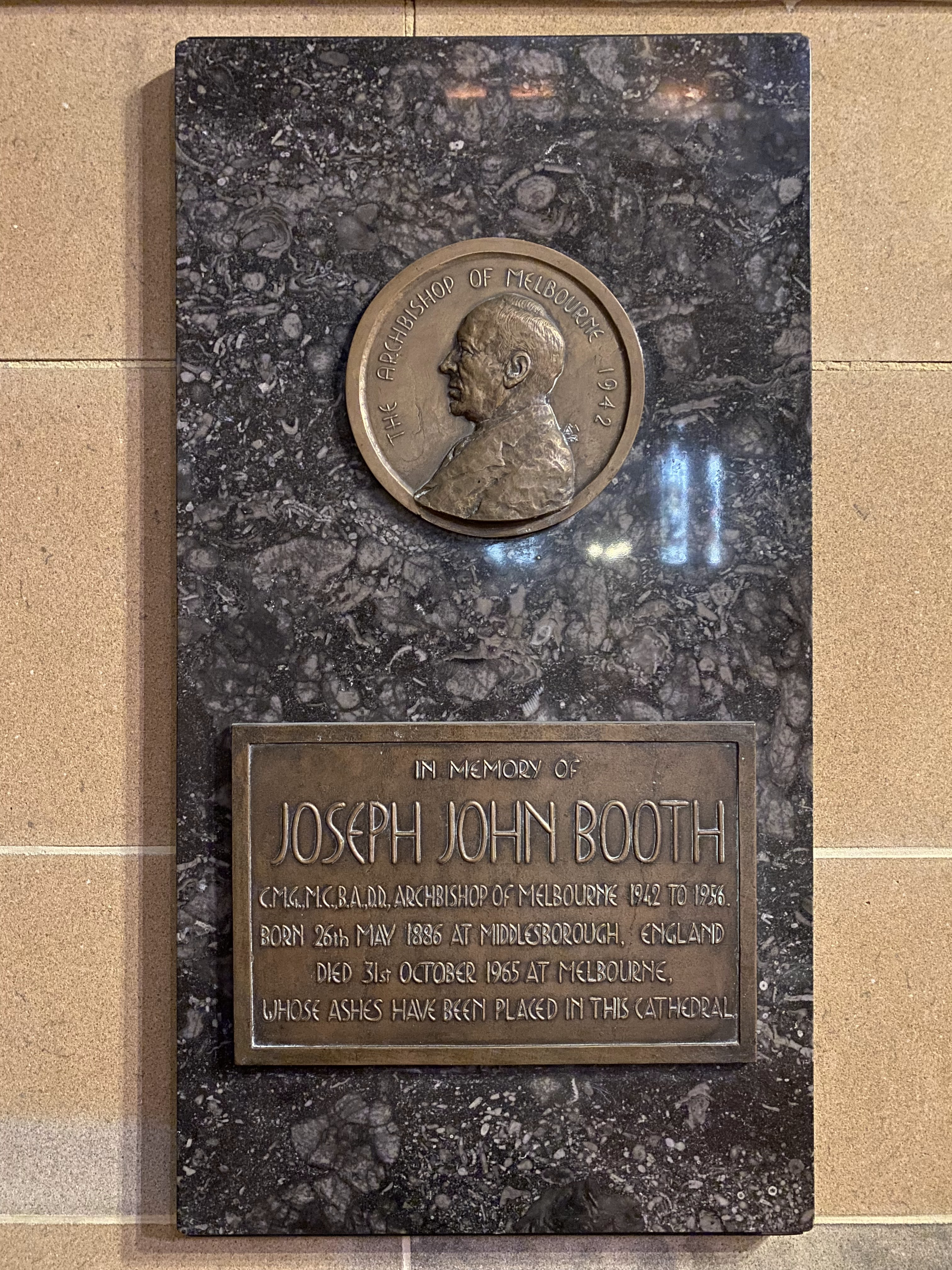
Memorial in St Paul's Cathedral

Joseph John Booth CMG (26 May 1887 – 30 October 1965) was the 7th Anglican Archbishop of Melbourne.

Booth was educated at the University of Melbourne and ordained as a priest in 1914. His first position was as a chaplain to the Australian Naval and Military Expeditionary Force during World War I. When peace came he became vicar of Fairfield, Victoria and later the Archdeacon of Dandenong before becoming a coadjutor bishop in the Melbourne diocese (with the courtesy title of "Bishop of Geelong") and often deputised for the archbishop, Frederick Waldegrave Head. In 1936 he additionally became Archdeacon of Melbourne. Booth became the archbishop of the Anglican Diocese of Melbourne in 1942. Further wartime service with the Allied Invasion Forces provided an unusual start to an episcopate. He retired in 1957.
