= Boothe Lake =

- Location within California
- Location: Yosemite National Park, Mariposa County, California
- Coordinates: 37°48′00″N 119°20′52″W
- Type: lake

Boothe Lake is a lake in Yosemite National Park, United States.

Boothe Lake was named in honor of Clyde Boothe, a park ranger.

== See also ==
- List of lakes in California
