= Booth's Gin =

Brand of London dry gin

Booth's Gin is a once well-known and widely consumed make of London dry gin, recently reintroduced after years of being unavailable. It was founded by a Lincolnshire branch of the ancient Booth family in about 1740.

Booth's Gin was most famously sold in distinctive hexagonal glass bottles. Its paper labelling alluded to the Red Lion distillery in Clerkenwell where the drink was originally produced, and to the heraldic crest of the Booth family.

Known as the "gentleman's gin", reputedly it was a favourite of both Queen Elizabeth II, and the Queen Mother. English novelist and critic Sir Kingsley Amis (1922–1995) favoured Booth's as a mixer for pink gin.

The brand, owned by Diageo Spirits, was by the 21st century only produced in the United States and ceased production in 2017. In November 2018, the brand was sold to the Sazerac Company.

Sazerac recommenced production of Booth's Finest Old Dry Gin in the United Kingdom in 2022.

== See also ==
- Sir Felix Booth
