= Jerome Booth =

British economist

- Education: University of Bristol; University of Oxford
- Occupation: Investor
- Title: Dr

Jerome Paul Booth (born July 1963) is a British economist, author, emerging markets investor and chairman of New Sparta. He was previously head of research at emerging market asset manager Ashmore Group plc., chairman of Anglia Ruskin University (2015–2020), and chairman of UK Community Foundations (UKCF).

== Early life ==
Jerome Booth received a Bachelor of Science in geography from the University of Bristol. He then received an MPhil and DPhil in Economics from the University of Oxford.

== Career ==
Booth started his career at the Department of Trade and Industry, where he was responsible for multi-lateral development banks, before being appointed a strategic planning officer at the Inter-American Development Bank in Washington DC. During this period, Booth was also a lecturer in economics at Christ Church, Oxford.

In 1994, Booth joined ANZ as Head of Research for the Emerging Markets Group before being appointed Head of Market Research for ANZ Investment Bank with global responsibility for fixed-income and foreign exchange research.

In 1999, Booth was part of the management buy-out of ANZ Investment Bank that established Ashmore Group plc, the emerging market asset management firm, and was appointed Head of Research and spokesperson. The team bought ANZ Emerging Market Fund Management, which had approximately $500m in assets, and listed it on the London Stock Exchange.

While at the company Booth was a high-profile advocate for emerging markets and argued that investors should allocate half of their portfolio to emerging market assets. He was described as "evangelical in his enthusiasm for emerging markets" by The Financial Times. In 2014, he also published 'Emerging Markets in an Upside Down World', a critique of finance theory, that argued that investors had underestimated risk in the developed world and overestimated it in the emerging markets.

In 2013, Booth retired from Ashmore to establish New Sparta, a London-based investment vehicle. Booth is also the principal shareholder of New Sparta Productions and Notgoingtouni.

Booth is also former chairman of Anglia Ruskin University, former chairman of UK Community Foundations (UKCF) and an honorary visiting professor at Cass Business School. A keen musician, he is also chairman of the Britten Sinfonia and a board member of the Royal Philharmonic Society. He was previously chairman of the Fitzwilliam Museum Development Trust.

Booth is also a director of the Global Warming Policy Foundation.

== Selected publications ==
- Emerging Markets in an Upside Down World: Challenging Perceptions in Asset Allocation and Investment (The Wiley Finance Series), 2014. ISBN 978-1-118-87967-2
