= Joe Booth =

English footballer (1871–1931)

Personal information
- Full name: Joseph Booth
- Date of birth: 1871
- Place of birth: Edgworth, England
- Date of death: 1931 (aged 59–60)
- Position: Inside forward

Senior career*
Years	Team	Apps	(Gls)
1897–1898	Rochdale		
1898–1900	Bury	7	(1)
Total		7	(1)
- * Club domestic league appearances and goals

Joseph Booth (1871–1931) was an English footballer who played in the Football League for Bury.
