= Harold Booth (footballer) =

Australian rules footballer

Personal information
- Full name: Harold Harding Booth
- Born: 4 August 1886; Collingwood, Victoria
- Died: 22 July 1964 (aged 77); Box Hill, Victoria
- Original team: Mornington

Playing career^{1}
Years	Club	Games (Goals)
1912	St Kilda	2 (0)
- ^{1} Playing statistics correct to the end of 1912.

Harold Harding Booth (4 August 1886 – 22 July 1964) was an Australian rules footballer who played with St Kilda in the Victorian Football League (VFL).
