= Boothe Memorial Park and Museum =

Coordinates: 41.2354°N 73.1117°W

- Boothe Homestead
- U.S. National Register of Historic Places
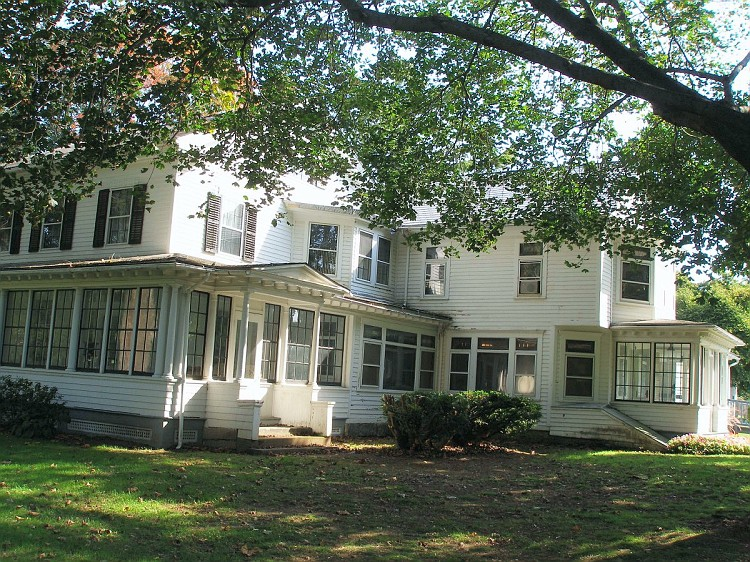
- The Boothe Homestead

- Location within Connecticut Location within the United States
- Location: 5774 Main Street, Stratford, Connecticut
- Built: 1914
- Architect: Boothe, David & Stephen
- Architectural style: Greek Revival, Queen Anne, Shingle Style
- Website: boothememorialpark.org
- NRHP reference No.: 85000951
- Added to NRHP: May 1, 1985

Boothe Memorial Park and Museum sits on a 32-acre (130,000 m^{2}) site in the Putney section of Stratford, Connecticut. Built about 1840 and remodeled in 1914, it is said to be "The Oldest Homestead in America," since it sits on the foundations of a 1663 house, and has been continuously occupied. Circa 1914 two brothers, David Beach Boothe and Stephen Nichols Boothe, created the Boothe Memorial Museum which maintains a collection of twenty architecturally unique buildings. Some of the structures include a carriage house, Americana Museum, miniature lighthouse, windmill, a clock tower museum, trolley station, chapel, and a blacksmith shop. The property became a public park owned by the town of Stratford in 1949.

Boothe Memorial Park and Museum was listed on the National Register of Historic Places on May 1, 1985.

== Observatory ==
The BMAS (Boothe Memorial Astronomical Society) Observatory was built in 1957 on the grounds of the park, located near the cemetery. The observatory features two telescopes: a 16-inch Cassegrain (1960) and 4 inch Unitron refractor.

== Putney chapel ==
Originally constructed in 1844 for Congregationalist services, the Putney Chapel was moved onto Boothe Park grounds in 1968 from a nearby location on Chapel Street. The chapel is officially non-denominational, handicapped accessible and can still be used as a place of worship or for events, being rentable by the day.

== Toll booth ==
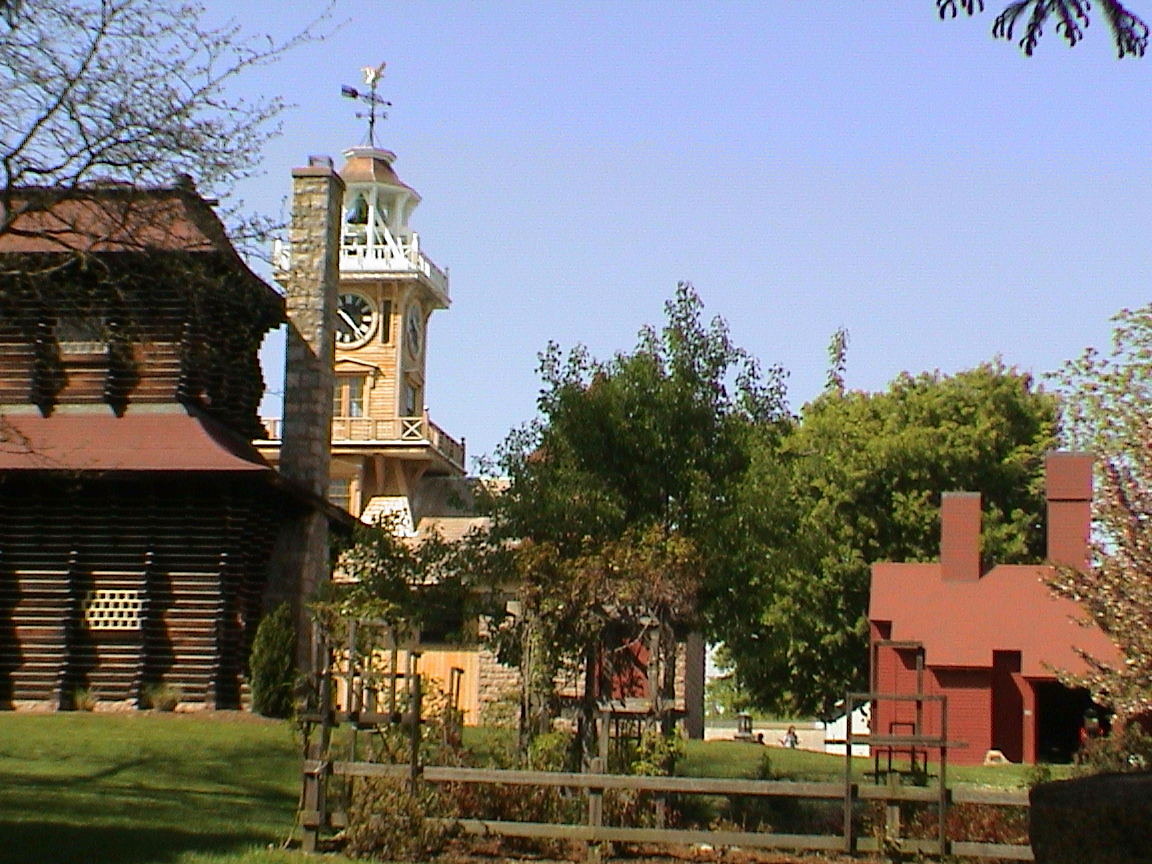
Other buildings in the park

The park also contains the last remaining highway toll booth in Connecticut. It was removed from the Milford side of the Igor I. Sikorsky Memorial Bridge at the end of the Merritt Parkway, when state toll booths were abolished in June 1988. The booth is of wooden log architecture and is also on the list of National Register of Historic Places.

== See also ==
- National Register of Historic Places listings in Fairfield County, Connecticut
