= 1864 in the United Kingdom =

Events from the year 1864 in the United Kingdom.

== Incumbents ==
- Monarch – Victoria
- Prime Minister – Henry John Temple, 3rd Viscount Palmerston (Liberal)

== Events ==
- 11 January – Charing Cross railway station in London opens.
- 11 March – Great Sheffield Flood: the Dale Dike Dam bursts devastating Sheffield.
- 29 March – Treaty of London: Britain voluntarily cedes control of the United States of the Ionian Islands to the Kingdom of Greece with effect from 2 May.
- 1 April – Barrow Hematite Iron and Steel Company registered to take over and expand the works at Barrow-in-Furness, which will become the world's largest steel mill.
- April – Giuseppe Garibaldi visits England.
- 7 May – City of Adelaide is launched at Sunderland by William Pile, Hay and Co. for the Australia trade; by 2014 she will be the world's oldest surviving clipper.
- c. May–June – Ending of Second Anglo-Ashanti war.
- June – overarm bowling legalised in cricket.
- 20 August – John Alexander Reina Newlands produces the first periodic table of the chemical elements.
- 5–6 September – Bombardment of Shimonoseki: An American, British, Dutch and French alliance engages the powerful feudal Japanese warlord or daimyō Lord Mōri Takachika of the Chōshū clan based in Shimonoseki, Japan.
- 15 September – The explorer of Africa, John Hanning Speke, 37, accidentally shoots himself at Neston Park, his estate in Wiltshire.
- 28 September – International Workingmen's Association founded in London.
- 10 October – Quebec Conference to discuss plans for the creation of a Dominion of Canada, begins.
- 18 October – abolition of squadron colours in the Royal Navy, reserving the White Ensign to the Navy, the Red Ensign to the Merchant Navy and the Blue Ensign to military vessels.
- 22 October – the predecessor of Wrexham A.F.C. plays its first match, making it the oldest association football club in Wales and the world's sixth oldest football club and third oldest professional team.
- 2 November – HMS Victoria (1859), the Royal Navy's last, largest and fastest wooden first-rate three-decker ship of the line to see sea service, enters active service.
- 10 November – first match played on the newly laid out Royal North Devon Golf Club course, the oldest surviving in England.
- 8 December
  - The Clifton Suspension Bridge across the Bristol Avon, designed by Isambard Kingdom Brunel and completed as a memorial to him, opens to traffic.
  - James Clerk Maxwell presents his paper A Dynamical Theory of the Electromagnetic Field to the Royal Society, concluding that light is an electromagnetic wave.
- Undated
  - Joseph Hepworth sets up his tailoring business in Leeds, predecessor of Next plc.
  - Oriel Chambers, Liverpool, the world's first metal-framed glass curtain walled building, designed by Peter Ellis (architect), is built.

== Publications ==
- Harry Clifton's song "Pretty Polly Perkins of Paddington Green".
- Charles Dickens's last completed novel Our Mutual Friend (serialisation begins, May).
- Amelia Edwards' novel Barbara's History.
- John Henry Newman's spiritual autobiography Apologia Pro Vita Sua.
- James Payn's novel Lost Sir Massingberd (in Chambers's Journal).
- Anthony Trollope's novel The Small House at Allington (publication concludes) and Can You Forgive Her? (publication commences).
- John Wisden publishes The Cricketer's Almanack for the year 1864 (February) which will go on to become the major annual cricket reference publication.

== Births ==
- 8 January – Prince Albert Victor, Duke of Clarence and Avondale (died 1892)
- 21 January – Israel Zangwill, novelist and playwright (died 1926)
- 20 February – Henry Rawlinson, 1st Baron Rawlinson, general (died 1925)
- 12 March – W. H. R. Rivers, psychiatrist (died 1922)
- 6 April – William Bate Hardy, biologist and food scientist (died 1934)
- 9 April – Sebastian Ziani de Ferranti, electrical engineer and inventor (died 1930 in Switzerland)
- 22 April – Phil May, caricaturist (died 1903)
- 4 May – Marie Booth, third daughter of William and Catherine Booth (died 1937)
- 5 May – Sir Henry Wilson, 1st Baronet, field marshal (died 1922)
- 25 May – Herbie Hewett, cricketer (died 1921)
- 10 June – Ninian Comper, architect (died 1960)
- 18 July – Philip Snowden politician, Chancellor of the Exchequer (died 1937)
- 11 September – Mark Sheridan, music-hall performer (suicide 1918)
- 14 September – Robert Cecil, 1st Viscount Cecil of Chelwood, politician and diplomat, recipient of the Nobel Peace Prize (died 1958)
- 31 October – Cosmo Lang, Archbishop of Canterbury (died 1945)
- 26 November – Edward Higgins, 3rd General of The Salvation Army (died 1947)

== Deaths ==
- 29 January
  - Lucy Aikin, writer (born 1781)
  - Julia Maitland, writer on India and for children (born 1808)
- 2 February – Adelaide Anne Procter, poet (born 1825)
- 10 February – William Henry Hunt, watercolour painter (born 1790)
- 14 February – William Dyce, painter (born 1806)
- 11 March – Richard Roberts, mechanical engineer (born 1789)
- 16 March – Robert Smith Surtees, novelist and sporting writer (born 1805)
- 21 March – Luke Howard, meteorologist and manufacturing chemist (born 1772)
- 5 April – Alaric Alexander Watts, poet and journalist (born 1797)
- 16 April – George Webster, architect (born 1797)
- 26 April – John Shuttleworth, industrialist and political campaigner (born 1786)
- 5 May – Elizabeth Andrew Warren, Cornish botanist, marine algolologist (born 1786)
- 20 May – John Clare, Northamptonshire "peasant poet" (born 1793)
- 4 June – Nassau W. Senior, economist (born 1790)
- 17 June – William Cureton, Orientalist (born 1808)
- 6 August – Catherine Sinclair, Scottish novelist and children's writer (born 1800)
- 15 September – John Hanning Speke, explorer (born 1827; accident)
- 17 September – Walter Savage Landor, writer and poet (born 1775)
- 1 October – Ignatius Spencer, priest (born 1799)
- 25 November – David Roberts, painter (born 1796)
- 4 December – John Fowler, agricultural engineer (born 1826)
- 8 December – George Boole, mathematician and philosopher (born 1815)
- 21 December – Joshua Fawcett, clergyman and writer (born 1809)
- 23 December – James Bronterre O'Brien, Chartist leader, reformer and journalist (born 1804)
- 24 December – Princess Caraboo, impostor (born 1791)
