= Lucy Booth =

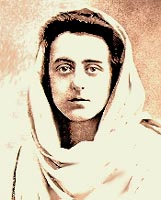
Lucy Booth-Hellberg Ruhani

Commissioner Lucy Milward Booth-Hellberg (28 April 1868 – 18 July 1953) was the eighth and youngest child of Catherine and William Booth, the Founder of The Salvation Army.

== Salvation Army officer ==
At the age of 16, Lucy and her sister Emma went to India to work with the Salvation Army there. Emma married Frederick Tucker in 1888. The Booth-Tuckers soon moved to London because of Emma's failing health, and Lucy followed.

On 18 October 1894 Lucy married Colonel Emanuel Daniel Hellberg, a Swedish officer. As was the custom in the Booth family, the couple added 'Booth' to their married name, becoming Booth-Hellberg. They went on to have five children together: Emma, Eva, Lucy, Daniel and Ebba Mary Booth-Hellberg. Their son Daniel died in infancy in 1896. Lucy returned to India with her new husband and they together commanded the Indian Territory, taking on the names Ruhani and Raj-Singh respectively. They were appointed to France and Switzerland in 1896.

Lucy wrote the song "Keep on Believing" for the Salvation Army. In 1909 her husband died. For a brief time she was engaged to Commissioner Cornelius Obadiah Phelps, before her brother Bramwell ended it. She went on to become the territorial commander for Denmark, Norway, and South America, before retiring in 1934. In 1933 she was admitted to the Salvation Army's most prestigious award, the Order of the Founder, "for long and exceptional service under peculiarly difficult circumstances, together with her readiness at all times to answer to the call of duty, particularly in the earlier years in India and France, and, latterly, in South America".

"Commissioner Lucy" died at Bromma in Stockholm on 18 July 1953, at the age of 85.
