= Frederick Booth-Tucker =

Officer of Salvation Army (1853 – 1929)

The Right Honorable Commissioner Frederick Booth-Tucker OF

Personal details
- Born: 21 March 1853 Monghyr, India
- Died: 17 July 1929 (aged 76)
- Occupation: Officer in The Salvation Army

Commissioner Frederick St. George de Lautour Booth-Tucker, OF (21 March 1853 – 17 July 1929) was a senior Salvation Army officer and the son-in-law of Willam and Catherine Booth, the founders of the Salvation Army.

== Early life ==
Born in Monghyr in India, the son of William Thornhill Tucker, a deputy commissioner in the Indian Civil Service and author of an English-Persian dictionary, Tucker was five years old when the Indian Mutiny broke out. He was educated at Cheltenham College from 1866 until 1873, leaving when he was 20 years old. During his time at the college he was known as a keen scholar and athlete. He joined the Indian Civil Service as an assistant commissioner in 1874, being posted to Amritsar, Simla and later to Dharamsala, where he was also assistant magistrate. In 1875, he was converted to Christianity during the Dwight L. Moody and Ira D. Sankey revival meetings in London. He married Louisa Mary Bode, 18 years his senior, in 1877 at Amritsar in India.

== Salvation Army ==
Booth-Tucker with his family after his wife's death (c.1903)

Against the wishes of his wife and parents, Tucker joined Salvation Army in 1881 while on leave in England from the Indian Civil Service and came to work in the legal department at the international headquarters in London. He was posted to the Camberwell Corps in July 1882.

On 19 September 1882 Major Tucker arrived in Bombay accompanied by three officers intending to spread the teachings of the Salvation Army in India. Although thousands attended the meetings, most of Tucker's early converts were already Christians.

Tucker saw the Indian caste system as his main obstacle, so he decided to work among India's 60 million outcasts. He and his fellow Salvationists adopted the way of life of the outcasts. Their Salvation Army uniforms were replaced with the saffron robes of the Indian fakir, and they assumed Indian names, Tucker being known as "Fakir Singh", meaning the "Lion of God".

Tucker's preaching of equality and salvation proved popular with the members of outcast society, many of whom were converted. Following this success in India, Tucker was promoted to the rank of commissioner. Louisa Tucker died in India on 27 February 1887 during a cholera epidemic, and on 10 April 1888 he married Emma Booth, the daughter of William and Catherine Booth. As was the usual practice in the Booth family at that time, Tucker added his wife's maiden name to his own, becoming Booth-Tucker. The couple had nine children, Frederick Kristodas (who attended Monkton Combe School in Somerset in 1906-07), Catherine Motee, Lucy Mina, Herbert, John and Muriel; three others, William, Evangeline and Bramwell Tancred died in infancy., (Note: Frederick Kristodas Booth-Tucker (15 April 1892 – 25 July 1945) died in Los Angeles where he owned Six Wheels, Inc. (Families of Lancaster, Philadelphia & York County, PA on 'Rootsweb'). Their daughter Catherine Motee became a Salvation Army officer in 1913 from Simla, in India, where the Booth-Tucker family had lived. She married Major Hugh Sladen in 1916, and in 1921 the couple were Divisional Commanders for Newport. Muriel Booth-Tucker was born on 17 May 1903, the youngest child of Frederick Booth-Tucker and his second wife, Emma Moss Booth, and granddaughter of the founder William Booth. She was commissioned as a Salvation Army officer in 1925, and after appointments in Britain (1925–1935), served in India (1935–1938), Australia (1938–1950), International Training College (1950–1952), Territorial Commander, Madras and Telegu, India (1952–1957), Officer Commanding, Ireland (1958–1960), Territorial Commander, Belgium (1960–1963). She retired from active service on 17 May 1963, and lived until 13 March 1995.) (Note: Emmaline Booth-Tucker (1898–1898) and William Booth-Tucker (1899–1900) were buried at Kensico Cemetery in Valhalla, New York. Bramwell Tanered Booth-Tucker (1896–1896) was buried at Abney Park Cemetery. His father was later buried there with him.)

Emma became ill during the time of their stay in India, and so in 1891 they returned to London as joint commissioners for foreign affairs. In 1896 they were appointed joint territorial commanders of the United States following the defection of Emma's brother Ballington Booth. Emma was given the title 'The Consul' by her father. However, in October 1903 Emma was killed in a train crash while travelling to meet her husband in Chicago.

Booth-Tucker continued his work in America alone until 1904, when he returned to London as foreign secretary. In June 1906, Booth-Tucker married Colonel Minnie Reid, daughter of a one-time acting governor of Bombay. Posted to India in 1907 as the special commissioner for India and Ceylon, he and Minnie started work among the so called criminal tribes in 1908. They started the work in answer to a petition of the ICS to Booth-Tucker to help reeducating a tribe in Gorakhpur. Booth-Tucker thus started to build up a correction-settlement for the roughly 300 members of the tribe. Due to the apparent success of the settlement, the ICS asked for Booth-Tuckers participation in other settlements. By the end of 1911 the majority of settlements were under the supervision of the Salvation Army.

== Later years ==
In 1913 Booth-Tucker was invested with the gold Kaisar-i-Hind Medal by the Viceroy of India Lord Hardinge, in recognition of the many years of service he had given to the poor of India. In 1919, suffering from ill-health, Booth-Tucker returned to England, but his relationship with his former brother-in-law General Bramwell Booth had cooled over the years, and he was never again appointed to a senior command.

In 1920 Booth-Tucker was admitted to the Order of the Founder, the Salvation Army's highest accolade. He retired from active service in 1924 but with his wife continued to lead many spiritual campaigns during the 1920s in Britain and Europe and National Congresses in the Baltic States and Finland.

He wrote several poems and songs, and while in the United States he compiled a collection of One Hundred Favourite Songs of The Salvation Army (1899). In 1893 he became the first editor of The Officer magazine, and he wrote several books, including Life of Catherine Booth (1892); The Consul (1903), and Muktifauj (1923), the story of the first 40 years of the Salvation Army in India and Ceylon.

Booth-Tucker died of angina pectoris on 17 July 1929, and, like many prominent Salvationists, was buried in Abney Park Cemetery.

== Bibliography ==
- The Life Of Colonel Weeresooriye (1888)
- The Short Life of Catherine Booth, the Mother of the Salvation Army (1892, 1910) Also published as The life of Catherine Booth : the mother of the Salvation Army.
- Gems from the Life of Catherine Booth, the Mother of the Salvation Army : being extracts from the original (1893)
- A year of grace : being a sketch of the advance of the Salvation Army with statements of account for the year ended 30 September 1893 (1893)
- Our future pauper policy in America ... a paper read at the monthly meeting of the United Charities of New York ... (189?)
- In Darkest England, and the Way Out (date unknown)
- Darkest India : A Supplement to General Booth's "In Darkest England, and the Way Out" (1891)
- The Devil's Army : a novel (1895) This was published in the Salvation Army's 'Officer' magazine in serial form from January 1895 to January 1896. In 2006 the story was published in novel form with an introduction, footnotes and illustrations by Garth R. Hentzschel. ISBN 0-9752199-1-X.
- The Salvation Army in India : with a preface and an appendix with R Gillespie; T M Hudson (1896)
- Back to the land! : or the ten-acre farms of the Salvation Army (1898?)
- Farm colonies of the Salvation Army (1898)
- William Booth, the General of the Salvation Army (1898)
- The Salvation Army in the United States : annual report, A.D. 1899 (1899)
- The Salvation Army in the United States : Christmas, 1899 (1899)
- One hundred favourite songs and music : of the Salvation army : together with a collection of fifty songs and solos musical score (1899)
- The Social Relief Work of the Salvation Army in the United States (1900)
- Salvation songs for the use of the Salvation Army (1900)
- Prairie Homes for City Poor (1901)
- Light in darkness : being an account of the Salvation Army in the United States (1902)
- The landless man to the manless land, or; The farm colonies of the Salvation army (n.p., 1902?)
- Visions (1906)
- The Consul : A sketch of Emma Booth Tucker, by her husband, Booth Tucker (1903, and 1907) (view on line )
- A review of the Salvation Army land colony in California (1903?)
- The Salvation Army in the United States (1904)
- Colonel Weerasooriya with Bramwell Booth (1905) (some sources list this as Commissioner Weerasooria and others as The warriors' library: Colonel Weerasooriya)
- Memorandum regarding leading eucalypts suitable for India (1911)
- What The Salvation Army Is Doing In India And Ceylon (1913)
- Criminocurology; or, The Indian crim [sic], and what to do with him : Being a review of the work of the Salvation army among the prisoners, habituals and criminal tribes of India (1916. Another source reports between 1912 and 1916)
- The Indo-British Association : reprint of a speech delivered by Commissioner Booth Tucker at the Cannon Street Hotel, 30 October 1917 (1917)
- Six-six-six : The mark of the beast (1920)
- The Bible : the Pen-Gem of the world (1922)
- Jesus at His Home in Nazareth (1923)
- Muktifauj, or, Forty years with the Salvation Army in India and Ceylon (1923?)
- The successful soul-winner : a summary of Finney's revival lectures with Charles Finney (1926)
- Freeman of Shanghai (1928) some sources have the title Freemen of Shanghai (1922?)
- Commander Booth-Tucker on His Trial in Court of General Sessions-Judge Newburger (1927)
- The Salvation Army in America; selected reports, 1899–1903 (1972)
- The Housing of the poor (late 19th or early 20th century)
- How to help the poor to help themselves (19--?)
- The Salvation Army as a temperance movement; being notes of an address at the Chautauqua Assembly, New York (19--)

== See also ==
- National Irrigation Congress
