= Emma Booth-Tucker =

British Salvation Army officer

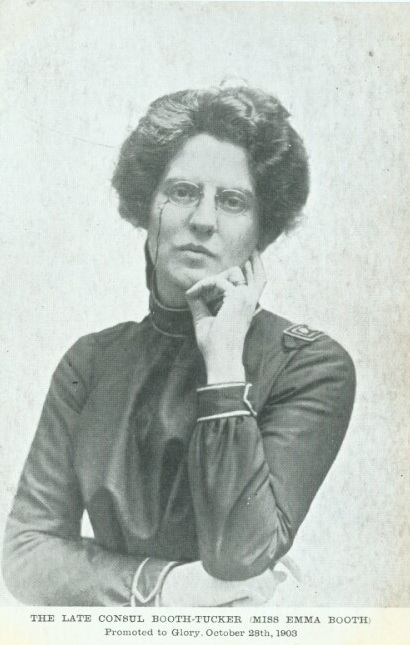
'In memoriam' postcard for Emma Booth-Tucker (c.1903)

Emma Moss Booth-Tucker (8 January 1860 – 28 October 1903), known as 'The Consul', was the fourth child and second daughter of William Booth, the founder of the Salvation Army.

== Salvation Army Officer ==
Converted at a young age, Emma Booth spoke in public for the first time during a stay at St Leonards. Aged just 19, Emma Booth became the Principal of the Officers' Training Home, The Salvation Army's first training school for women. On 10 April 1888 she married Major Frederick Tucker, the son of an affluent British family living in India, whose first wife had died of cholera in India in the previous year. Emma Booth and Frederick Tucker married at Clapton Congress Hall. As was the usual practice in the Booth family at that time, Tucker added his wife's maiden name to his own, becoming Booth-Tucker. The couple had a total of nine children; Frederick, Catherine Motee, Lucy, Herbert, John and Muriel and three others, William, Evangeline and Bramwell Tancred who died in infancy. (Note: Frederick Kristodas Booth-Tucker (15 April 1892-25 July 1945) died in Los Angeles where he owned Six Wheels, Inc. (Families of Lancaster, Philadelphia & York County, PA on 'Rootsweb'). Their daughter Catherine Motee became a Salvation Army officer in 1913 from Simla, in India, where the Booth-Tucker family had lived. She married Major Hugh Sladen in 1916, and in 1921 the couple were Divisional Commanders for Newport. Muriel Booth-Tucker was born on 17 May 1903, the youngest child of Frederick Booth-Tucker and his second wife, Emma Moss Booth, and granddaughter of the founder William Booth. She was commissioned as a Salvation Army officer in 1925, and after appointments in Britain (1925-1935), served in India (1935-1938), Australia (1938-1950), International Training College (1950-1952), Territorial Commander, Madras and Telegu, India (1952-1957), Officer Commanding, Ireland (1958-1960), Territorial Commander, Belgium (1960-1963). She retired from active service on 17 May 1963, and lived until 13 March 1995.) (Note: Emmaline Booth-Tucker (1898-1898) and William Booth-Tucker (1899-1900) were buried at Kensico Cemetery in Valhalla, New York. Bramwell Tanered Booth-Tucker (1896-1896) was buried at Abney Park Cemetery. His father was later buried there with him.)

They remained for some time in India, but later moved back to London due to Emma Booth-Tucker's poor health. They worked for the Salvation Army International Headquarters in London before being posted to the United States in 1896, where they replaced Emma's brother Ballington and his wife Maud who had left the Salvation Army. They successfully managed to regain many of the converts lost by Ballington Booth's leaving, and Emma Booth-Tucker was given the title 'The Consul' by her father. The Booth-Tuckers' primary work was prison visitation and carrying out the farm colony experiment for urban poor envisaged in William Booth's book In Darkest England and the Way Out.

In 1903, at the age of 43, Emma Booth-Tucker died of a fractured skull and internal injuries in a train accident on her way from Amity Colony, Colorado to Chicago, where she was going to meet her husband. Her funeral service was held at the Carnegie Music Hall in New York City on 1 November 1903, and she was buried at the Kensico Cemetery in Valhalla, New York.

Emma Booth-Tucker died leaving a husband and six children. She was succeeded in her work in the United States by her younger sister Evangeline Booth.

== Bibliography ==
- Battle songs Musical score (1896)
- The League of love being the assistant rescue branch of the Salvation army (1896)
- Called Out! and what comes of it with Herbert Howard Booth (1887)
- Little brothers and sisters : A short account of the first year's work in the Cherry-Tree home (ca. 1900)
- Warrior Magazine (Jan 1902)
- Heart messages (with Frederick St George De Lautour Booth-Tucker) (1903)
- In memoriam Consul Mrs. Booth-Tucker. Order of service, Carnegie Hall, Nov. 1, 1903 (1903)
- The cross our comfort : being selections from the writings of consul Emma Booth Tucker (1907)
- India's Millions: being a summary of a lecture on the work of the Salvation Army in India (1923)
- A newsboy's wonderful Christmas visitor (unknown)
