= Ballington =

Ballington is both a given name and a surname. Notable people with the name include:

- Ballington Booth (1857–1940), Salvation Army Officer and co-founder of Volunteers of America
- Kork Ballington (born 1951), Rhodesian-born South African Grand Prix motorcycle road racer
