= David Thomas (Protestant minister, born 1813) =

Welsh preacher (1813–1894)

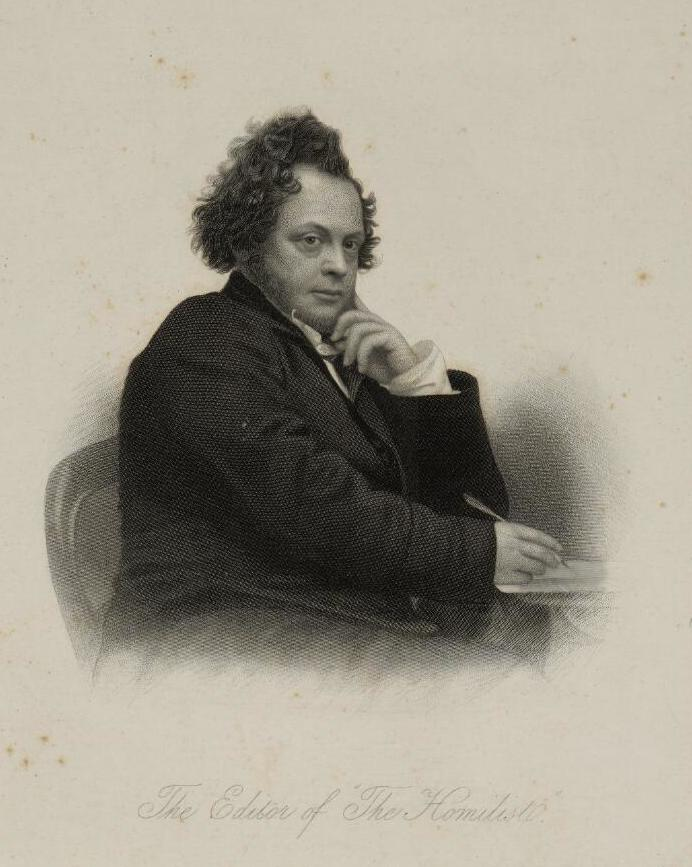
Portrait of The Editor of 'The Homilist'

David Thomas (1813 – 30 December 1894) was a Welsh preacher and publisher of The Homilist, a magazine of liturgical thought.

The son of William Thomas of Hopsill, also a preacher, Thomas was born near Tenby, Pembrokeshire and started life in a commercial career, in which he achieved a rapid success. Thomas was already giving his Sundays to preaching, and was prevailed upon to give up his business prospects in order to devote himself wholly to the ministry. He entered Newport Pagnell College to prepare for the ministry, and afterwards became pastor at Chesham. In 1844, he moved to Stockwell, London, where he ministered to a congregation reaching up to 900 people until his retirement in 1877. He began publication of The Homilist in 1852, and proceeded to publish over forty volumes. He also wrote The Crisis of Being—six lectures to Young Men on Religious Decision; The Progress of Being; The Genius of the Gospels; A Commentary on the Gospel of St. Matthew; The Practical Philosopher; Problemata Mnndi, and other works. His collected writings eventually filled nine volumes, republished between 1882 and 1889.

Thomas was the originator of the Working Men's Club and Institute, of which Lord Brougham was first president; and of an insurance plan for the benefit of widows of ministers. His congregants included Catherine Mumford (whose wedding to William Booth was officiated by Thomas in 1855) and Wilson Carlile. Pennsylvania's Waynesburg College awarded Thomas an Honorary Doctorate, recognizing his efforts to reconcile the churches of the United States and England.

He died at his daughter's home in Ramsgate on 30 December 1894 and was buried at West Norwood Cemetery.
