= Maud Ballington Booth =

American activist (1865–1948)

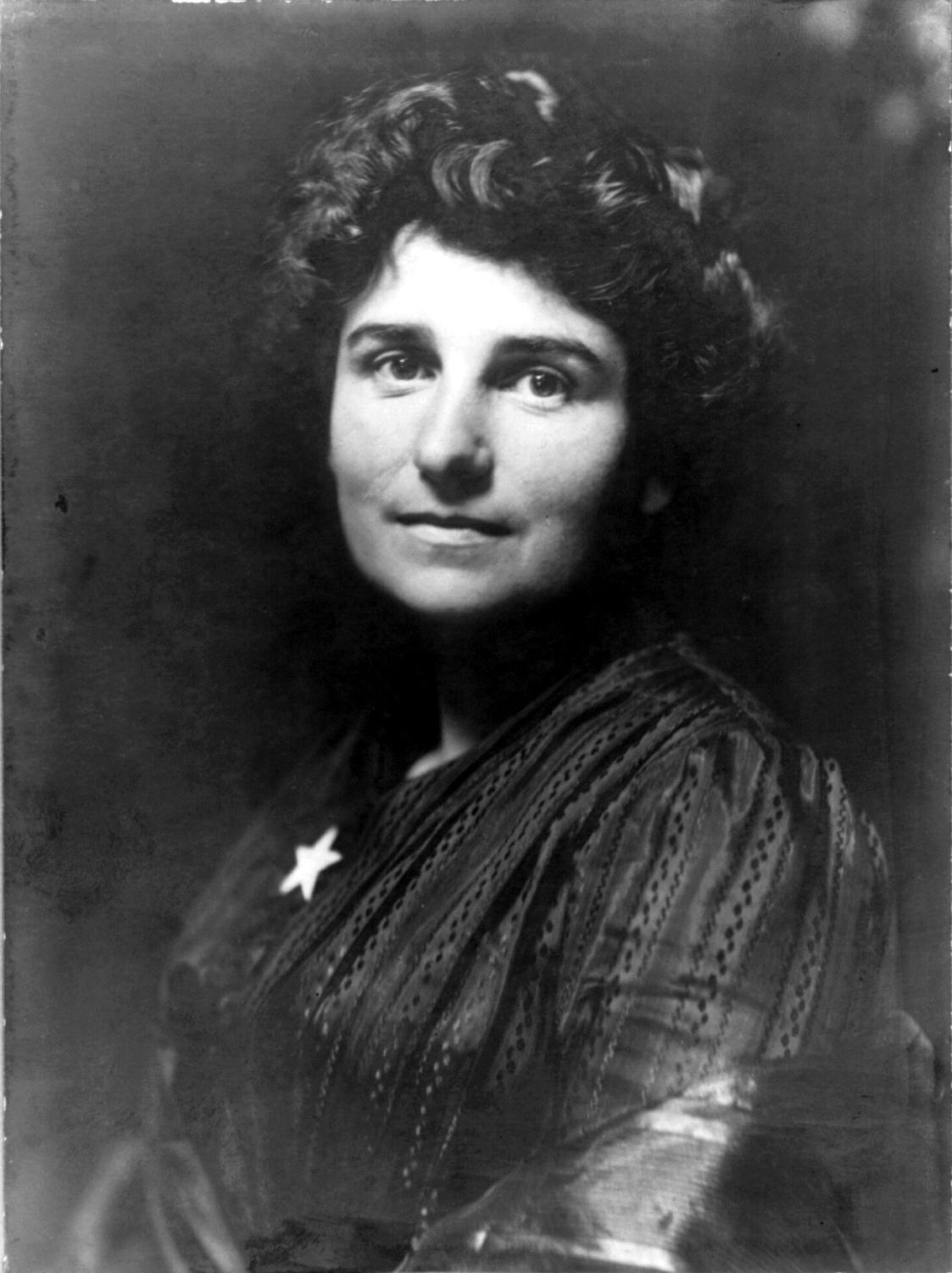
- Maud Ballington Booth in 1902
- Born: Maud Elizabeth Charlesworth; 13 September 1865; Limpsfield, Surrey, U.K.
- Died: 26 August 1948 (aged 82); Great Neck, New York, U.S.
- Spouse: Ballington Booth
- Relatives: Florence L. Barclay (sister)

Maud Elizabeth Charlesworth (September 13, 1865 – August 26, 1948) later changed her name to Maud Ballington Booth, was a Salvation Army leader and co-founder of the Volunteers of America.

== Early life and education ==
Maude Charlesworth was born in Limpsfield, near Oxted, Surrey, England, the daughter of Rev. Samuel Charlesworth, an Anglican rector. One of three girls, she was a sister to bestselling romance novelist, Florence L. Barclay. When she was four, her father moved his family to Limehouse in London. The work of both her parents there in social issues led to Maud’s interest for social welfare and social service.

== Career ==
In 1882, Charlesworth became a companion of Miss Catherine Booth in organizing a branch of the Salvation Army in Paris. In 1883, they went to Geneva, Switzerland, where they were both expelled after aggressive police interrogation. She stayed with the Booth family and worked in the London slums and elsewhere until her marriage to the second son of the founder of the Salvation Army, Ballington Booth in 1886, against her father's wishes. They had two children, Theodora and Charles.

In 1887, she took command of the Salvation Army forces in the United States alongside her husband, Ballington Booth. She was also active and successful in slum mission work in New York City. In 1895, Booth became a naturalized American citizen. She lived in Kew Gardens, Queens.

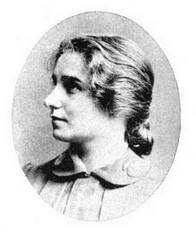
Maud Ballington Booth

In 1896, Ballington and Maud left the Salvation Army after a dispute with General Booth, to co-found the Volunteers of America. Maud was also known for working to improve the conditions of prisons in the late 19th and early 20th centuries. She later toured on the Chautauqua circuit, moving audiences with her vivid account of life in prisons and calls for reform. Among the other causes she embraced was the legalization of euthanasia.

In 1918, she went to England and France to visit American troops in World War I.

== Selected works ==
- Branded (1897)
- Lights of Child-Land (1902)
- After Prison —What? (1903)
- Twilight Fairy Tales (1906)
- "A Message from Mrs. Ballington Booth to the Volunteers of America" (1925)

== Later years ==
Booth's 75th birthday in 1940 was observed with celebrations in over 100 cities across the United States. She attended the event at New York City's Town Hall, which included messages from Franklin Delano Roosevelt and John J. Pershing on the occasion. Her husband died in 1940, and she died in 1948, at the age of 82, at her daughter's home in Great Neck, New York.
