= Volunteers of America =

American charitable organization

- Founded: March 8, 1896
- Founders: Ballington Booth, Maud Booth
- Type: Faith-based charity
- Headquarters: Alexandria, Virginia, U.S.
- Region served: United States, Puerto Rico
- Employees: 16,000
- Volunteers: 60,000
- Website: voa.org

Volunteers of America (VOA) is a nonprofit organization founded in 1896 that provides affordable housing and other assistance services primarily to low-income people throughout the United States. Headquartered in Alexandria, Virginia, the organization includes 31 affiliates and serves approximately 1.5 million people each year in 46 states, the District of Columbia, and Puerto Rico.

In addition to those in need of affordable housing, VOA assists veterans, low-income seniors, children and families, the homeless, those with intellectual disabilities, those recovering from addiction, and the formerly incarcerated.

== History ==
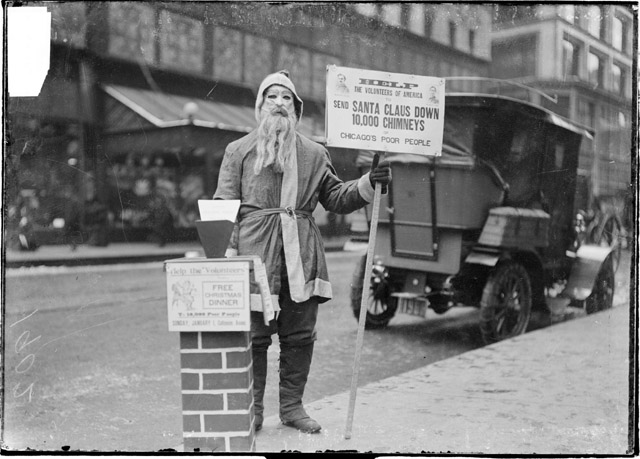
A man dressed as Santa Claus (center) fundraising for Volunteers of America on the sidewalk of street in Chicago, Illinois, in 1902. He is wearing a mask with a beard attached.

Volunteers of America was founded on March 8, 1896 by social reformers Ballington Booth and his wife Maud Booth in Cooper Union's Great Hall. Ballington Booth was the son of General William Booth, founder of the Salvation Army, and the couple served as officers with the Army in Great Britain.

The Booths first moved to New York in the 1890s to assume command of The Salvation Army forces in the United States. The couple was successful in bolstering the image of The Salvation Army in America and in growing the movement's social work mission. After disagreements with other Salvation Army leaders, including Ballington Booth's brother Bramwell Booth, the Booths left the organization and established Volunteers of America.

In the early 1900s, the organization began an expansive philanthropic program that included employment bureaus, co-operative stores, medical dispensaries, distribution of clothes, women's sewing classes, Thanksgiving meals, reading rooms, fresh air camps and other establishments. During the advent of the Great Depression in the 1930s, Volunteers of America mobilized to assist the millions of people who were unemployed, hungry and homeless. Relief efforts included employment bureaus, wood yards, soup kitchens and "Penny Pantries" where every food item cost one cent.

By the 1960s, Volunteers of America was well known for its thrift stores and annual fundraising efforts like the Sidewalk Santa campaign in New York City. In an effort to modernize its programs, the organization began to focus its work in the area of housing for the poor following the establishment of the U.S. Department of Housing and Urban Development.

Volunteers of America is ranked among the largest charities in the United States by The NonProfit Times, The Chronicle of Philanthropy and Forbes among other publications, with annual revenue of more than $1 billion in 2015. The organization is one of the largest nonprofit providers of affordable housing for the elderly, low-income families and people with intellectual or physical disabilities in the United States.

=== Origin of the name 'Volunteers of America' ===
The first volunteer firehouse was started in 1736. In the 1800s, volunteer work for social reform, including women's rights, child labor, and the abolition of slavery, culminated in the creation of institutions and social services to improve the lives of others.

When Volunteers of America was founded in 1896, volunteerism in the modern sense of the word did not exist. To "volunteer" at that time meant serving others as a full-time vocation. Early members of the organization came to call themselves the "Volunteers of America" to differentiate themselves from The Salvation Army as an organization by Americans, for Americans.

In fact, Volunteers of America is staffed primarily by paid staff, rather than unpaid volunteers. More than 16,000 paid professionals serve as administrators, caregivers, skilled nurses, physical therapists, occupational therapists, speech language pathologists, psychologists, housing experts, architects, and a number of other positions at the organization.

=== Housing ===
As of 2017 the organization owned and/or managed around 19,000 affordable housing units that provide homes to nearly 25,000 people each year.

In 2009 Affordable Housing Finance magazine ranked Volunteers of America as the top nonprofit in its "Top 50 Affordable Housing Owners," and also ranked the organization in the "Top 50 Affordable Housing Developers" in 2007 and "Top 10 Companies Completing Acquisitions." The magazine also selected a Volunteers of America multifamily community, Lord Tennyson outside San Francisco, as the "best of the best" affordable housing project in the country for 2007.

VoA also reaches out to homeless people in many cities through street outreach and mobile outreach services.

=== Children, youth and families ===
In 2017, Volunteers of America donated a backpack to every student living in New York City shelters, resulting in the donation of over 140,000 backpacks over 14 years.
