= Marie Booth =

Third daughter of Catherine and William Booth, the founders of the Salvation Army

Marian Billups Booth

Marian Billups Booth (4 May 1864 – 5 January 1937), better known as Marie Booth, was the third daughter of Catherine and William Booth, the founders of the Salvation Army.

Unusually for the Victorian era, all of William and Catherine Booth's children survived into adulthood. Marie, however, had an accident at an early age that caused her to have convulsions thus limiting her mobility; therefore, she was the only one of the Booth's children who did not regularly serve in the Salvation Army. She was, however, given the permanent rank of staff captain.

Her sister Evangeline Booth often took care of her, and is said to have got into trouble for reprimanding a governess who had scolded Marie for being slow with her lessons. Marie was often pictured at family occasions such as her father's funeral in 1912.

Marian Billups Booth died in 1937 aged 72 and is buried with her parents in Abney Park Cemetery in Stoke Newington.

== Gallery ==
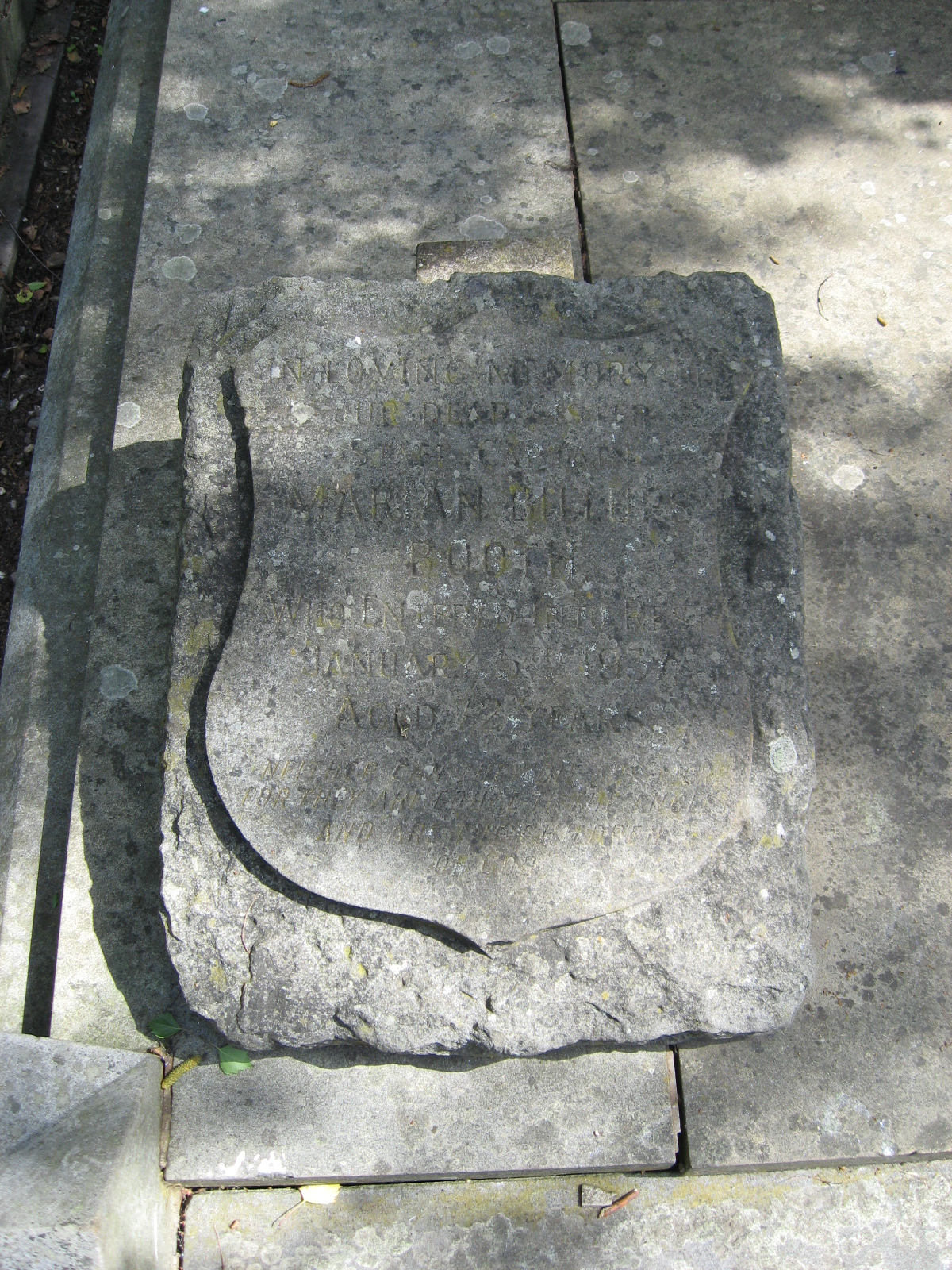
Marian Booth's memorial tablet on her parents' grave
