= Joshua Fawcett =

English clergyman and writer (1809–1864)

Joshua Fawcett (9 May 1809, Bradford, Yorkshire - 21 December 1864) was an English clergyman and miscellaneous writer.

== Life ==
Fawcett was the second son of Richard Fawcett, worsted manufacturer, of Bradford, Yorkshire. He was educated at a grammar school at Clapham, London, and at Trinity College, Cambridge, and took the degrees in arts, B.A. in 1829, M.A. in 1836. He was ordained in 1830, and after serving curacies at Pannall, near Harrogate, Yorkshire, and at Everton, near Liverpool, Lancashire, he was presented in 1833 by his brother-in-law, Henry Heap, vicar of Bradford, to the perpetual curacy of Holy Trinity, Wibsey, Low Moor. Fawcett as clergyman was an advocate of total abstinence, and a popular lecturer.

During his incumbency he built a new church, opened in 1837, and a parsonage. As the population of Low Moor and its immediate neighbourhood multiplied, five additional churches were erected. In 1860 he became honorary canon of Ripon Cathedral, Yorkshire, and chaplain to the bishop. He died suddenly at Low Moor 21 December 1864, and was buried on the 28th in Holy Trinity churchyard. In 1834 he married Sarah, third daughter of the Rev. Lamplugh Hird. His widow and two sons survived him.

== Works ==
His writings include:

- ‘A Harmony of the Gospels,’ London, 1836.
- ‘The Churches of York by W. Monkhouse and F. Bedford, junior, with Historical and Architectural Notes by J. Fawcett,’ York [1843].
- ‘A brief History of the “Book of Common Prayer” of the Church of England,’ London [1844].
- ‘A Memorial, Historical and Architectural, of the Parish Church of St. Peter's, Bradford, Yorkshire,’ Bradford, 1845; reprinted Bradford, 1848.
- ‘Church Rides in the Neighbourhood of Scarborough,’ London, Scarborough [printed], 1848.
- ‘A Memorial, Historical and Architectural, of the Church of St. Thomas à Becket, Heptonstall, in the Parish of Halifax and County of York,’ Bradford, 1849.
- ‘“The Flood came and took them all away,” a sermon [on Matt. xxiv. 39] on the Holmfirth Flood ... To which is added a detailed account of the awful disaster at Holmfirth,’ London, Brighton [printed], 1852.
- ‘Pastoral Addresses First Series,’ London, 1855.
- 'The Church Rambler in Craven,' a series in the Leeds Intelligencer.

He also edited ‘The Village Churchman,’ afterwards incorporated with ‘The Churchman,’ and continued under the title of ‘The Churchman's Magazine,’ 8 vols. London, 1838–45.
