= In Darkest England and the Way Out =

1890 book by William Booth

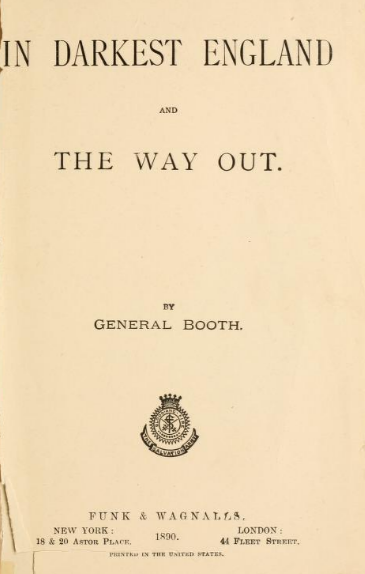
- Title page for In Darkest England and the Way Out (1890)
- Author: William Booth
- Publication date: 1890

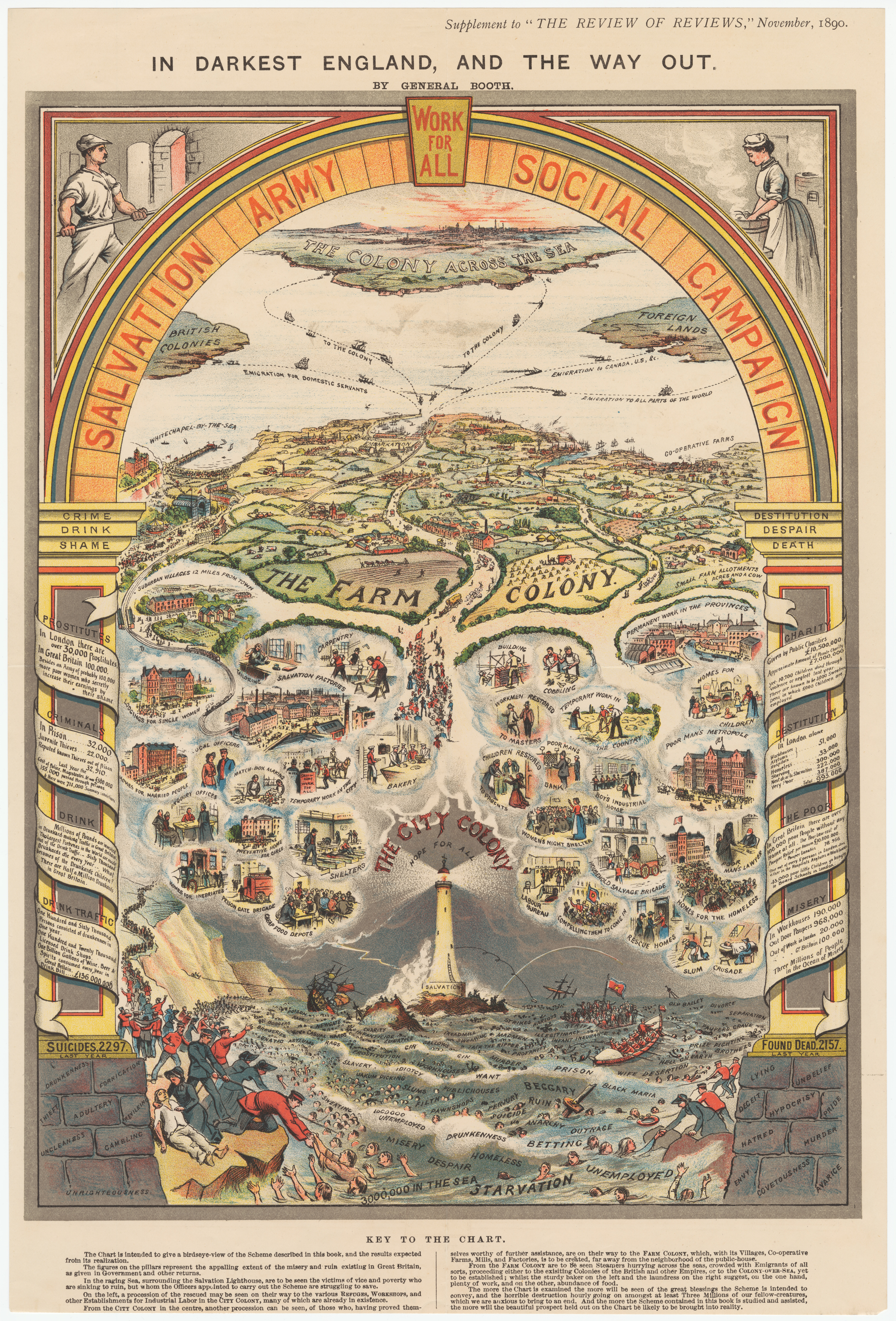
An allegorical map included in In Darkest England, illustrating Booth's proposed scheme for salvation of the poor, including three forms of colony: city, farm, and across the sea.

In Darkest England and the Way Out is an 1890 book written by William Booth in which Booth, the founder of the Salvation Army, proposed a number of social reforms to improve the living conditions of the poor in Victorian England. Among other measures, Booth envisioned the creation of "City Colonies", "Farm Colonies" and "Over-Sea Colonies", each "self-helping and self-sustaining communities" which would provide food, work, and shelter for the needy.

In Darkest England set the foundation for the Salvation Army's modern social welfare approach. It compared what was considered "civilised" England with "Darkest Africa" – a land then considered poor and backward. What Booth suggested was that much of London and greater England after the Industrial Revolution was not better off in the quality of life than those in the underdeveloped world.

== Background and composition ==
Booth wrote In Darkest England while his wife, Catherine Booth, lay ill. Catherine died two weeks before the book was published. Booth wrote a tribute to Catherine in the book's preface, expressing his gratitude that "amid the ceaseless suffering of a dreadful malady, my dying wife found relief in considering and developing the suggestions which I have set forth".

Among the works from which Booth drew inspiration was the first volume of Charles Booth's Life and Labour of the People in London, published in 1889, which attempted to quantitatively measure the extent of poverty and deprivation in London. In Darkest England, William Booth would use the figures published in Life and Labour of the People in London to extrapolate estimates which applied to the entire country.

Booth was aided in the composition of Darkest England by the newspaper editor W. T. Stead. It was asserted in some circles that In Darkest England was actually written by the crusading journalist, W. T. Stead, who, in his own words, acted as a "literary hack" for the General when Mrs. Booth lay dying. However, this assumption was swiftly dismissed by Stead some years later, declaring that, "The idea of Darkest England ... was the General's own. My part, of which I had no wish to speak ... was strictly subordinate throughout."

== Title ==
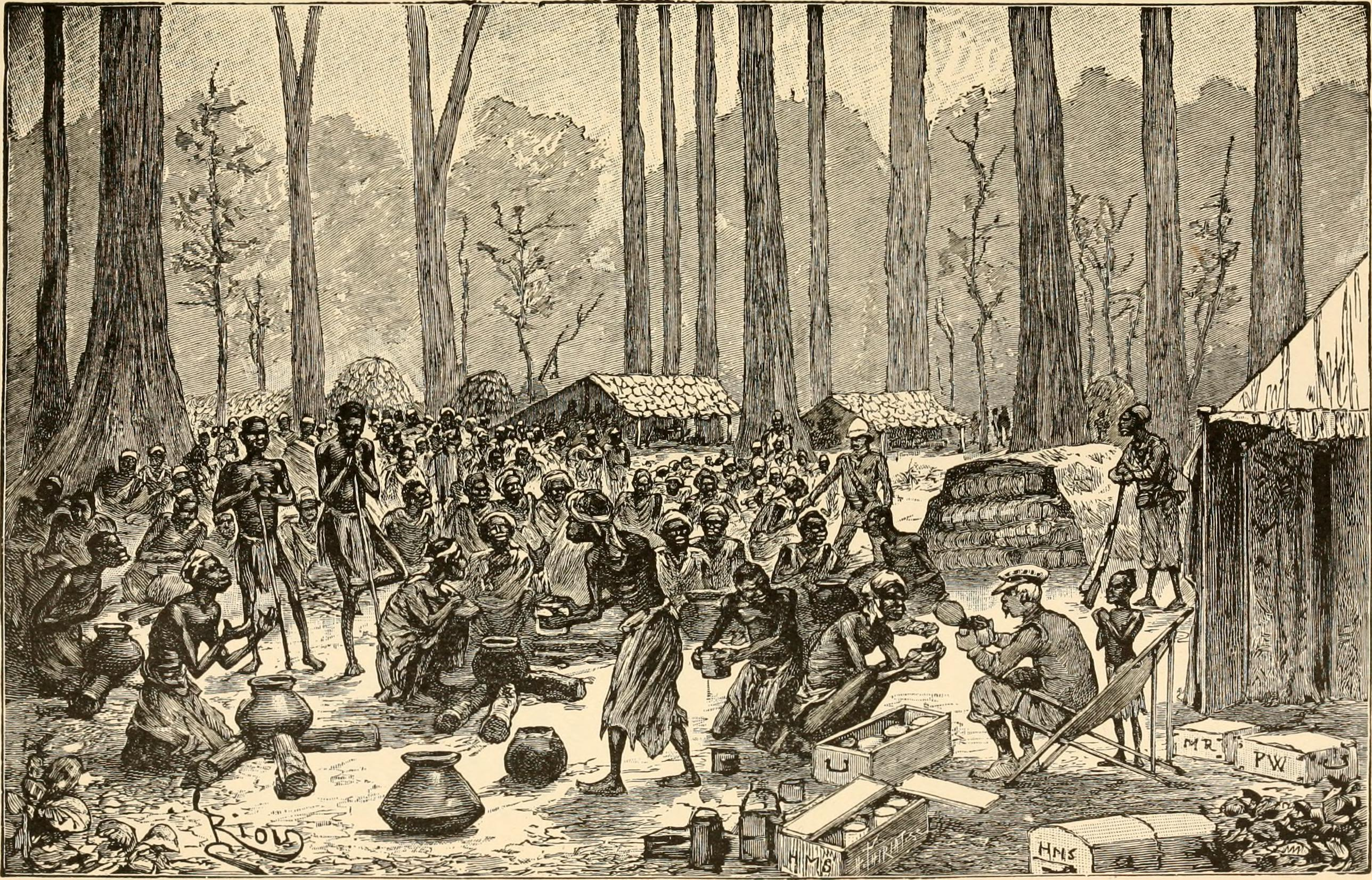
Illustration from Stanley's In Darkest Africa. Booth drew an analogy between the lives of the poor in England with the apparent brutality of Central Africa, as described by Stanley.

The title phrase In Darkest England was chosen as an allusion to In Darkest Africa, the explorer Henry Morton Stanley's account of his travels through Central Africa. Booth employs an extended metaphor comparing the privations of England's poor with those described by Stanley, writing that Darkest England is "alike in its vast extent..., its monotonous darkness, its malaria and its gloom, its dwarfish dehumanized inhabitants, the slavery to which they are subjected, their privations and their misery".

== Summary ==
Booth proposed a strategy to apply the Christian Gospel and work ethic to the problems. The book speaks of abolishing vice and poverty by establishing homes for the homeless, farm communities such as Hadleigh Farm where the urban poor can be trained in agriculture, training centres for prospective emigrants, homes for fallen women and released prisoners, aid for the poor, and help for drunkards. He also lays down schemes for poor men's lawyers, banks, clinics, industrial schools and even a seaside resort. He says that if the state fails to meet its social obligations it will be the task of each Christian to step into the breach. However, Booth was not departing from his spiritual convictions to set up a socialist or communist society or sub-class, supported by people forced to finance his plans; Booth's ultimate aim was to get people "saved."

Booth asserts in his introduction,

I have no intention to depart in the smallest degree from the main principles on which I have acted in the past. My only hope for the permanent deliverance of mankind from misery, either in this world or the next, is the regeneration or remaking of the individual by the power of the Holy Ghost through Jesus Christ. But in providing for the relief of temporal misery I reckon that I am only making it easy where it is now difficult, and possible where it is now all but impossible, for men and women to find their way to the Cross of our Lord Jesus Christ.

== Impact ==
Within a month of publication, Darkest England had sold 115,000 copies.

In Darkest England and the Way Out was reprinted several times and lately in 2006. There are also other works that have focused on the impact and significance of In Darkest England. For example, marking the 125th anniversary of the publication of In Darkest England, the book Darkness and Deliverance: 125 Years of the Darkest England Scheme contains fifteen chapters from leading and emerging authors that explore various historical aspects and future implications of the Darkest England scheme.
