= James William Massie =

James William Massie (11 November 1799 – 8 May 1869) was a Scottish nondenominational minister and missionary to India.

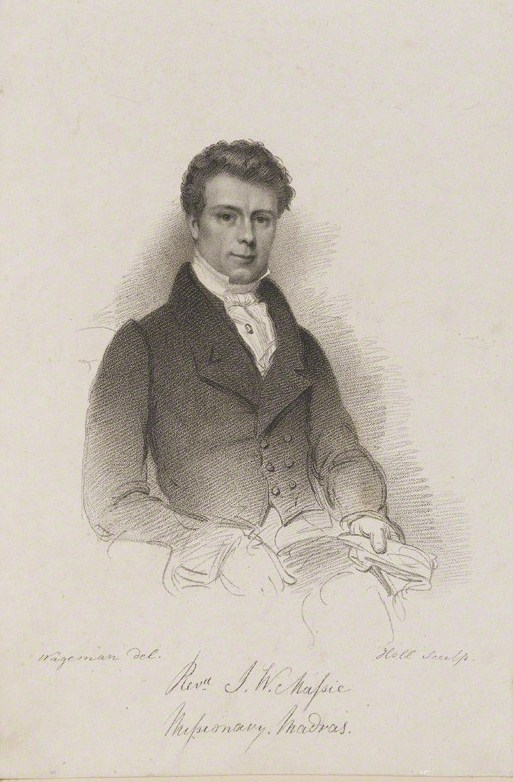
James William Massie

== Life ==
Born in Glasgow, Scotland, he was ordained in 1822. He then began his ministry as a missionary with the London Missionary Society in India - first in Madras from 1823 to 1825, and then Bangalore from 1825 until around 1827. From 1828 until 1830, he tried to establish a Congregational chapel in Dunfermline, Scotland.

Massie ministered in Dublin from 1831 until 1836, and was then minister of Perth Congregational Church in Scotland until 1841. He was in Salford, England, until 1848, and then moved to London to become secretary of the Home Missionary Society.

Massie was frequently in Ireland, on revival work, and died in Kingstown, near Dublin. He was an advocate of free trade, making a celebrated speech for the anti-Cornlaw League in 1842. He was also an abolitionist, and a member of the union and emancipation societies that were formed during the American Civil War in America. He visited America several times. He was married with one son, Milton, and two daughters. In A Summer Ramble in Belgium, Germany, and Switzerland is a dedication penned by Massie to the memory of his recently deceased son, John Hendric Agnis Massie (1826-1845). It is unclear if "Milton" was a nickname for John Massie.

== Publications ==
- Liberty of Conscience Illustrated
- The Contract: War and Christianity
- A Summer Ramble in Belgium, Germany, and Switzerland: Recollections of a Tour
- The American Crisis, in Relation to the Anti-slavery Cause
- The Slave: Hunted, Transported, and Doomed to Toil
- Religion in India: A Voice Directed to Christian Churches for Millions in the East
- The Evangelical Alliance; Its Origin and Development
- America: The Origin of Her Present Conflict; Her Prospect for the Slave, and Her Claim for Anti-Slavery Sympathy
