= Catherine Booth =

Englishwoman who co-founded The Salvation Army

Saint Catherine Booth
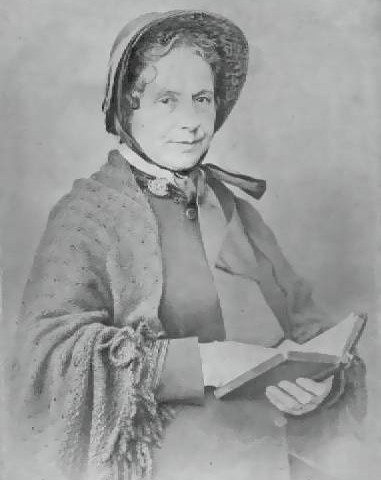

Mother of the Salvation Army
- Born: Catherine Mumford; 17 January 1829; Ashbourne, Derbyshire, England, United Kingdom of Great Britain and Ireland
- Died: 4 October 1890
- Honored in: The Salvation Army, Anglican Communion
- Major works: Practical Religion (1878); Godliness (1881); Aggressive Christianity (1883); Life and Death (1883); Highway of our God (1886); Popular Christianity (1887)

Catherine Booth (née Mumford, 17 January 1829 – 4 October 1890) was co-founder of The Salvation Army, along with her husband William Booth. Because of her influence in the formation of The Salvation Army she was known as the 'Mother of The Salvation Army'.

== Life ==
She was born as Catherine Mumford in Ashbourne, Derbyshire, England, in 1829 to Methodist parents, John Mumford and Sarah Milward. Her father was an occasional lay preacher and carriage maker. Her family later moved to Boston, Lincolnshire, and later lived in Brixton, London. From an early age, Catherine was a serious and sensitive girl. She had a strong Christian upbringing and was said to have read the Bible through eight times before the age of 12.

During Catherine's adolescence a spinal curvature led to years of enforced idleness. She kept herself busy, however, and was especially concerned about the problems of alcoholism. As a young girl she had served as secretary of a Juvenile Temperance Society writing articles for a temperance magazine. Catherine was a member of the local Band of Hope and a supporter of the national Temperance Society.

When Catherine refused to condemn Methodist Reformers in 1850, the Wesleyan Methodists expelled her. For the Reformers she led a girls' Sunday school class in Clapham. At the home of Edward Rabbits, in 1851, she met William Booth, who had also been expelled by the Wesleyans for reform sympathies. William was reciting a temperance poem, "The Grog-seller’s Dream", which appealed to Catherine, who had embraced the new Methodist passion for abstinence.

They soon fell in love and became engaged. During their three-year engagement, Catherine constantly wrote letters of encouragement to William as he performed the tiring work of a preacher. They were married on 16 June 1855 at Stockwell Green Congregational Church in London. Their wedding was very simple as they wanted to use their time and money for his ministry. Even on their honeymoon, William was asked to speak at meetings.

The Booths had eight children: Bramwell Booth, Ballington Booth, Kate Booth, Emma Booth, Herbert Booth, Marie Booth, Evangeline Booth and Lucy Booth, and were dedicated to giving them a firm Christian knowledge. Two of their offspring, Bramwell and Evangeline, later became Generals of The Salvation Army.

== Ministry ==
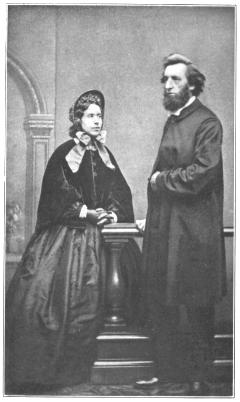
Catherine and William Booth

Catherine began to be more active in the work of the church at Brighouse. Though she was extremely nervous, she enjoyed working with young people and found the courage to speak in children's meetings. During this period she discovered a model, American Wesleyan revivalist Phoebe Palmer. With William's encouragement, Catherine wrote a pamphlet, Female Ministry: Woman’s Right to Preach the Gospel (1859), in defense of American preacher Mrs. Phoebe Palmer's preaching, whose preaching had caused a great stir in the area where the Booths lived. Female Ministry was a short, powerful apology for women's rights to preach the gospel. The pamphlet identifies three major principles on which her convictions rested. First, Catherine saw that women are neither naturally nor morally inferior to men. Second, she believed there was no scriptural reason to deny them a public ministry. Third, she maintained that what the Bible urged, the Holy Spirit had ordained and blessed and so must be justified. She complained that the "unjustifiable application" of Paul's advice, “ 'Let your women keep silence in the Churches' (1 Corinthians 14:34), has resulted in more loss to the Church, evil to the world, and dishonor to God, than any of [its] errors".

At that time, it was unheard of for women to speak in adult meetings. She was convinced that women had an equal right to speak. In January 1860, following the birth of their fourth child, at Gateshead, during William's sermon, she asked to "say a word". She witnessed to her timidity about claiming her calling, yet William announced that she would speak that night. It was the beginning of a tremendous ministry, as people were greatly challenged by her preaching.

She became a partner in her husband's work and soon found her own sphere as a powerful preacher. She also spoke to people in their homes, especially to alcoholics, whom she helped to make a new start in life. Often she held cottage meetings for converts. She eventually began to hold her own campaigns. Many agree that no man of her era, including her husband, exceeded her in popularity or spiritual results. Her first written article, the pamphlet Female Teaching was published in December 1859.

Catherine Booth was experienced in writing and she had for over twenty years tried to defend the right for women to preach the gospel on the same terms as men. At first, Catherine and her husband had shared a ministry as traveling evangelists. A woman preacher was a rarity in england, where women had few civil rights, and were not allowed to enter professions.

Amongst other activities, Catherine lobbied Queen Victoria to seek legislation for safeguarding females, in the form of the "Parliamentary Bill for the protection of girls".

== The Christian Mission ==
They began the work of The Christian Mission in 1865 in London's East End. William preached to the poor and ragged and Catherine spoke to the wealthy, gaining support for their financially demanding ministry. The textile industry employed as many women as men and contributed a substantial number of female officers. In addition, domestic indoor servants flocked to the Army, and many became officers. William and Catherine and their son Bramwell and daughter-in-law Florence were all vegetarian. Bramwell wrote a list of reasons he had maintained the diet.

The "Appointments of Officers, 1883" lists 127 married men. This number is important, because wives were expected to help run the corps. Since wives were not compelled to attend the officers' course at the Training Home, they were not given a commission and, therefore, did not appear in the list. General Booth had an active policy of encouraging officers to intermarry. The "Appointments of Officers, 1883" lists thirty-six couples who had done so, the women resigning their own rights of officership to become joint officers with their husbands. The loss of the women officers' rights when marrying contradicts the constant statement regarding equality. The Army leaders were clearly not so radical as to lose the concept of man's conjugal superiority. This social policy carried into pay; the husband, as head of the household, received the pay for the couple. The idea that single female officers could manage on less money than their male counterparts was abolished before the Second World War. Until that time, male officers received a third more pay than their female counterparts.

Catherine Booth organized Food for the Million shops where the poor could buy a cheap meal and at Christmas, hundreds of meals were distributed to the needy.

When the name was changed in 1878 to The Salvation Army and William Booth became known as the General, Catherine became known as the 'Mother of The Salvation Army.' She was behind many of the changes in the new organization, designing the flag and bonnets for the ladies, and contributed to the Army's ideas on many important issues and matters of belief.

The Booths rented a small villa, Crossley House, in Clacton-on-Sea, which had a sea view that she loved.

Catherine Booth died of breast cancer at age 61 at Crossley House. She is interred with her husband in Abney Park Cemetery, London.

Subsequently, Crossley House was donated to people with learning disabilities and provided many summer holidays until it was sold to property developers in 2005.

== Works ==
- Practical Religion (1878)
- Godliness (1881)
- Aggressive Christianity (1883)
- Life and Death (1883)
- Highway of our God (1886)
- Popular Christianity (1887)
- Life of Catherine Booth: The Mother of the Salvation Army (1892)
- Female Teaching

== Legacy ==
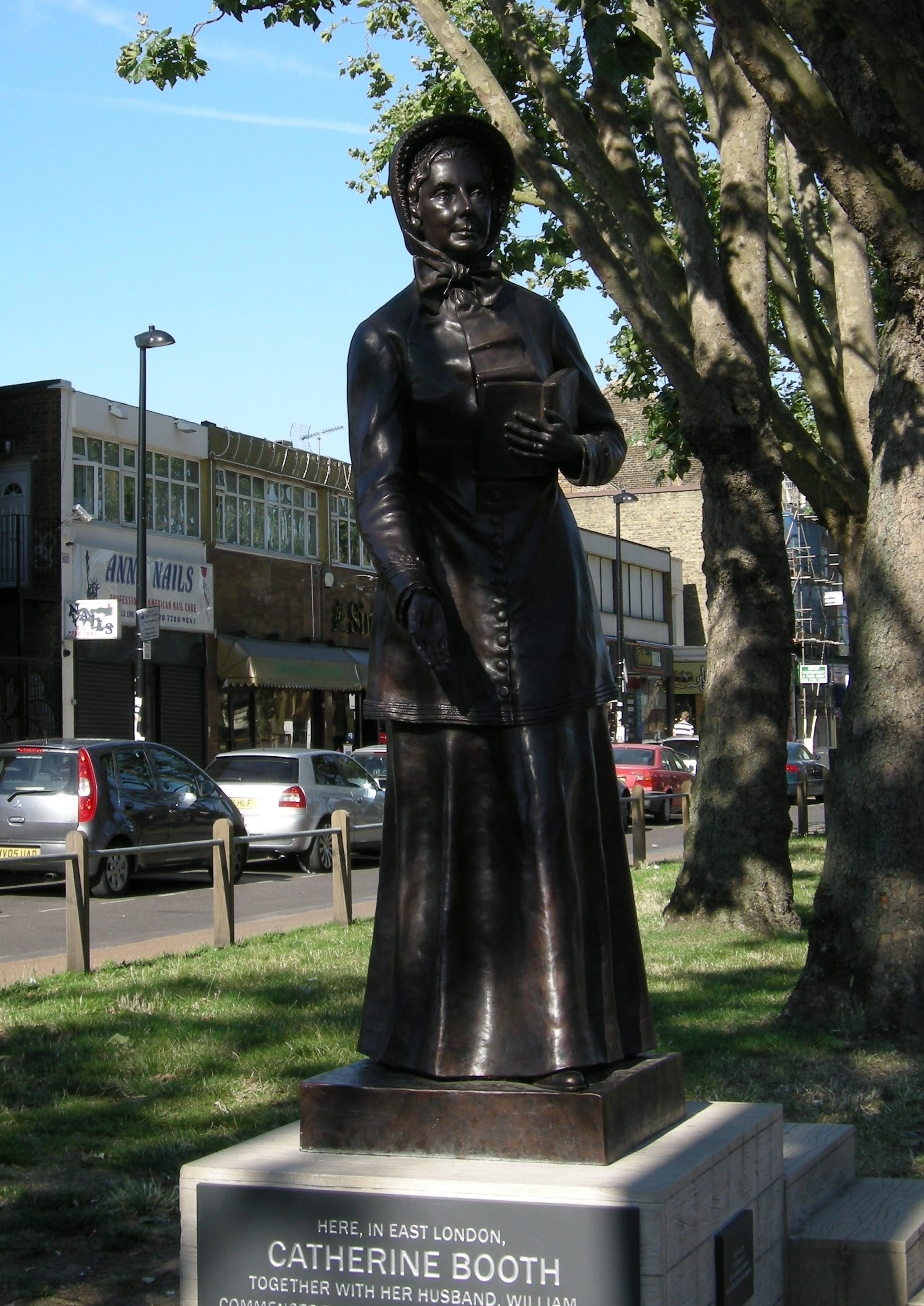
Statue of Catherine Booth in the Mile End Road, London, close to the site of the first Salvation Army meeting. The statue was donated by the women of the Salvation Army in the United States in 2015 to mark the Army's 150th anniversary.

- Catherine Booth Hospital (CBH) is a hospital and nursing school run by the Salvation Army in Nagercoil, Kanyakumari, Tamil Nadu, India.
- Catherine Booth House is a confidentially located domestic violence shelter in the Seattle/King County area. Operated by The Salvation Army, CBH has been serving battered women and their children since 1976.
- Catherine Booth Child Development Center is a preschool located in Cincinnati, Ohio.
- Statues of each of the Booths by George Edward Wade were erected on Champion Hill, next to the Salvation Army's training college in London in 1929.
- Replicas of the statues by Wade stand in the Mile End Road, London, close to the site of the first Salvation Army meeting. That of William was unveiled in 1979; and that of Catherine in 2015.
- Catherine Booth House is a residential and support unit for vulnerable families and mothers in Portsmouth, England.
- Catherine Booth Hospital in the Notre Dame de Grace sector of Montreal has been a rehabilitation center since 1973; it had been a maternity hospital since 1925, upon its move to its present location, and before that a rescue home for women (founded in 1890).
- Catherine is remembered (with William) in the Church of England with a commemoration on 20 August.

== See also ==
- Catherine Bramwell-Booth, her granddaughter
- Criminal Law Amendment Act 1885
