= National Register of Historic Places listings in Utah County, Utah =

Location of Utah County in Utah

Utah County, Utah, United States, has 179 properties and districts located on the National Register of Historic Places, including one National Historic Landmark. Another 17 sites in the county were once listed, but have since been removed.

Latitude and longitude coordinates are provided for many National Register properties and districts; these locations may be seen together in a map.

This National Park Service list is complete through NPS recent listings posted September 25, 2026.

== Current listings ==
	Name on the Register	Image	Date listed	Location	City or town	Description
1	George and Temperance Adams House	George and Temperance Adams House	December 30, 1999 (#99001628)	196 West 400 South; 40°17′25″N 111°41′58″W	Orem	Late Victorian style home built in 1895, expanded in 1903. Brick upon adobe with detail showing economic prosperity in Orem.
2	John Alma Adams House		June 9, 1987 (#87000825)	625 East 200 South; 40°21′42″N 111°43′34″W	Pleasant Grove	
3	William D. Alexander House	William D. Alexander House	July 28, 1983 (#83003195)	91 West 200 South; 40°13′51″N 111°39′33″W	Provo	Asserted to be the only period example of Stick Style architecture in the state.
4	Dr. Samuel H. Allen House and Carriage House	Dr. Samuel H. Allen House and Carriage House	May 18, 1979 (#79002515)	135 East 200 North; 40°14′12″N 111°39′19″W	Provo	
5	Alpine City Hall	Alpine City Hall	December 19, 1991 (#91001820)	20 North Main Street; 40°27′12″N 111°46′36″W	Alpine	
6	Alpine LDS Church Meetinghouse	Alpine LDS Church Meetinghouse	May 24, 1990 (#90000794)	50 North Main Street; 40°27′14″N 111°46′37″W	Alpine	
7	American Fork Cemetery Rock Wall	American Fork Cemetery Rock Wall	October 7, 1994 (#94001207)	600 North 100 East; 40°23′21″N 111°47′47″W	American Fork	
8	American Fork City Hall	American Fork City Hall	April 7, 1994 (#94000298)	31 Church Street; 40°22′39″N 111°47′53″W	American Fork	
9	American Fork Historic District	American Fork Historic District	December 10, 1998 (#98001447)	Roughly along 100 South from 300 West to 200 East; 40°22′29″N 111°47′59″W	American Fork	
10	American Fork Presbyterian Church	American Fork Presbyterian Church	May 23, 1980 (#80003975)	75 North 100 East; 40°22′41″N 111°47′44″W	American Fork	
11	American Fork Second Ward Meetinghouse	American Fork Second Ward Meetinghouse	March 10, 1992 (#92000101)	130 West 100 South; 40°22′32″N 111°48′05″W	American Fork	
12	American Fork Third Ward Meetinghouse	American Fork Third Ward Meetinghouse	December 20, 2002 (#02001554)	198 West 300 North; 40°23′01″N 111°48′09″W	American Fork	
13	Ashton-Driggs House	Ashton-Driggs House	April 14, 1972 (#72001261)	119 East Battle Creek Drive (200 South); 40°21′42″N 111°44′13″W	Pleasant Grove	
14	Thomas Austin House	Thomas Austin House	July 26, 1982 (#82004168)	427 East 500 North; 40°23′39″N 111°50′32″W	Lehi	
15	Bank of American Fork	Bank of American Fork	March 9, 1993 (#93000065)	1 East Main Street; 40°22′37″N 111°47′51″W	American Fork	
16	Barrett-Homer-Larsen Farmstead	Barrett-Homer-Larsen Farmstead	January 5, 2016 (#15000960)	63 North 400 West; 40°17′54″N 111°42′20″W	Orem	
17	David and Drusilla Baxter House	David and Drusilla Baxter House	June 11, 1998 (#98000653)	206 West 1600 North; 40°19′37″N 111°42′01″W	Orem	
18	Beck No. 2 Mine		March 14, 1979 (#79003483)	Burristan Pass Road; 39°56′38″N 112°05′48″W	Dividend	
19	George Angus and Martha Ansil Beebe House	George Angus and Martha Ansil Beebe House	October 31, 1980 (#80003979)	489 West 100 South; 40°13′56″N 111°39′58″W	Provo	
20	Beers House-Hotel	Beers House-Hotel	April 7, 1994 (#94000296)	65 North 100 East; 40°21′54″N 111°44′16″W	Pleasant Grove	
21	Roswell Darius Bird Sr. House	Roswell Darius Bird Sr. House	November 28, 1980 (#80003977)	115 South Main Street; 40°07′46″N 111°34′40″W	Mapleton	
22	John E. Booth House	John E. Booth House	February 11, 1982 (#82004171)	59 West 500 North; 40°14′25″N 111°39′32″W	Provo	
23	William and Ann Bringhurst House	William and Ann Bringhurst House	January 5, 1998 (#97001567)	306 South 200 West; 40°09′45″N 111°36′49″W	Springville	
24	George M. Brown House	George M. Brown House	December 1, 1982 (#82001759)	284 East 100 North; 40°14′06″N 111°39′10″W	Provo	
25	Edward "Bob" and Mertilla Bullock House		March 6, 2024 (#100010057)	1548 North Locust Lane; 40°15′17″N 111°38′21″W	Provo	
26	Caffrey and Davis Furniture Company-Senior Hotel	Caffrey and Davis Furniture Company-Senior Hotel	January 5, 1998 (#97001578)	296 South Main Street; 40°09′48″N 111°36′37″W	Springville	
27	Camp Floyd Site	Camp Floyd Site	November 11, 1974 (#74001939)	Off North 18150 West; 40°15′26″N 112°06′14″W	Fairfield	Part of Camp Floyd State Park Museum
28	Camp Williams Hostess House/Officers' Club	Camp Williams Hostess House/Officers' Club	April 1, 1985 (#85000816)	810 Officer Street; 40°26′03″N 111°55′19″W	Camp W. G. Williams	
29	Carter-Terry-Call House	Carter-Terry-Call House	June 11, 1998 (#98000658)	815 East 800 South; 40°16′57″N 111°40′31″W	Orem	
30	Cedar Fort School	Cedar Fort School	April 6, 2000 (#00000357)	40 East Center Street; 40°19′37″N 112°06′19″W	Cedar Fort	
31	Charcoal Kilns		March 14, 1979 (#79003491)	Homansville Canyon; 39°58′25″N 112°04′00″W	Dividend	
32	Delbert and Ora Chipman House	Delbert and Ora Chipman House	January 25, 1995 (#94001563)	317 East Main Street; 40°22′25″N 111°47′21″W	American Fork	
33	Henry & Elizabeth Parker Chipman House	Henry & Elizabeth Parker Chipman House	February 1, 2010 (#09001293)	846 East 300 North; 40°22′58″N 111°46′30″W	American Fork	
34	Christeele Acres Historic District		December 30, 1999 (#99001626)	Roughly bounded by South State Street, East 900 South, South 450 East, and East 1010 South; 40°16′46″N 111°41′06″W	Orem	
35	Clark-Taylor House	Clark-Taylor House	October 7, 1975 (#75001829)	306 North 500 West; 40°14′17″N 111°39′59″W	Provo	
36	Clinger-Booth House	Clinger-Booth House	June 11, 1998 (#98000660)	468 South Main Street; 40°17′19″N 111°41′42″W	Orem	
37	Harvey H. Cluff House	Harvey H. Cluff House	August 4, 1982 (#82004172)	174 North 100 East; 40°14′10″N 111°39′21″W	Provo	
38	Thomas & Elizabeth Coddington House	Thomas & Elizabeth Coddington House	January 18, 2018 (#100001982)	190 North 300 East; 40°22′50″N 111°47′26″W	American Fork	
39	Alexander and Nellie P. Cordner House	Alexander and Nellie P. Cordner House	June 11, 1998 (#98000649)	415 South 400 East; 40°17′22″N 111°41′06″W	Orem	
40	William James and Edna Cordner House	William James and Edna Cordner House	June 11, 1998 (#98000647)	440 South State Street; 40°17′21″N 111°41′28″W	Orem	
41	Cordner-Calder House	Cordner-Calder House	June 11, 1998 (#98000648)	305 South 900 East; 40°17′29″N 111°40′22″W	Orem	
42	Crandall Houses	Crandall Houses	January 19, 1983 (#83003196)	112 and 136 East 200 North; 40°10′09″N 111°36′28″W	Springville	
43	William J. and Lizzie Cullimore House	William J. and Lizzie Cullimore House	June 11, 1998 (#98000643)	396 West 1600 North; 40°19′40″N 111°42′17″W	Orem	
44	Thomas R. Cutler Mansion	Thomas R. Cutler Mansion	July 12, 1984 (#84002427)	150 East State Street; 40°23′45″N 111°50′42″W	Lehi	
45	Dallin House	Dallin House	March 31, 1994 (#94000346)	253 South 300 East; 40°09′45″N 111°36′11″W	Springville	
46	Charles E. Davies House	Charles E. Davies House	August 4, 1982 (#82004173)	388 West 300 North; 40°14′17″N 111°39′52″W	Provo	
47	Joshua Davis House	Joshua Davis House	June 11, 1998 (#98000642)	1888 South Main Street. 40°15′46″N 111°41′39″W	Orem	
48	Roe A. and Louise R. Deal House	Roe A. and Louise R. Deal House	January 5, 1998 (#97001568)	39 East 200 North; 40°09′52″N 111°36′34″W	Springville	
49	Deal-Mendenhall Hall	Deal-Mendenhall Hall	January 5, 1998 (#97001569)	163 East 200 North; 40°10′12″N 111°36′24″W	Springville	
50	Cecil I. and Mildred H. Dimick House	Cecil I. and Mildred H. Dimick House	June 11, 1998 (#98000638)	575 West 800 North; 40°18′43″N 111°42′33″W	Orem	
51	Christopher F. Dixon Jr. House	Christopher F. Dixon Jr. House	November 7, 1977 (#77001319)	248 North Main Street; 40°02′46″N 111°43′52″W	Payson	
52	John Dixon House	John Dixon House	February 17, 1978 (#78002701)	218 North Main Street; 40°02′45″N 111°43′53″W	Payson	
53	Samuel Douglass House	Samuel Douglass House	August 21, 1992 (#92001059)	215 North Main Street; 40°02′45″N 111°43′54″W	Payson	
54	Frederick and Della Dunn House	Frederick and Della Dunn House	August 3, 1990 (#90001142)	145 North Main Street; 40°10′09″N 111°36′37″W	Springville	
55	Dunn-Binnall House & Farmstead	Dunn-Binnall House & Farmstead	February 1, 2010 (#09001294)	352 North 200 East; 40°23′02″N 111°47′33″W	American Fork	
56	Dr. Elmo and Rhea Eddington House	Dr. Elmo and Rhea Eddington House	December 4, 1998 (#98001459)	617 North 100 East; 40°23′46″N 111°50′46″W	Lehi	
57	Simon P. Eggertsen Sr. House	Simon P. Eggertsen Sr. House	September 13, 1977 (#77001321)	390 South 500 West; 40°13′43″N 111°40′01″W	Provo	
58	Eureka Lilly Headframe	Eureka Lilly Headframe	March 14, 1979 (#79003487)	Dividend Road; 39°57′09″N 112°04′07″W	Dividend	
59	Fairfield District School	Fairfield District School	August 6, 1987 (#87000992)	59 North Church Street; 40°15′42″N 112°05′24″W	Fairfield	Part of Camp Floyd State Park Museum
60	Joseph H. Frisby House	Joseph H. Frisby House	July 13, 1984 (#84002428)	209 North 400 West; 40°14′12″N 111°39′58″W	Provo	
61	Fugal Blacksmith Shop	Fugal Blacksmith Shop	April 7, 1994 (#94000297)	Approximately 680 North 400 East; 40°22′15″N 111°43′54″W	Pleasant Grove	
62	Fugal Dugout House	Fugal Dugout House	March 27, 1986 (#86000611)	630 North 400 East; 40°22′14″N 111°43′55″W	Pleasant Grove	
63	Roy H. and Florence B. Gappmayer House	Roy H. and Florence B. Gappmayer House	June 11, 1998 (#98000672)	95 East 1200 South; 40°16′31″N 111°41′32″W	Orem	
64	Ira W. Gardner House	Ira W. Gardner House	July 28, 1977 (#77001323)	10 North Main Street; 40°03′17″N 111°40′20″W	Salem	
65	James H. and Rhoda H. Gardner House	James H. and Rhoda H. Gardner House	December 4, 1998 (#98001454)	187 East 300 North; 40°23′30″N 111°50′47″W	Lehi	
66	Charles T.H. Goode House		June 9, 1987 (#87000826)	1215 East Main Street; 40°22′33″N 111°46′05″W	American Fork	
67	Samuel I. and Olena J. Goodwin House	Samuel I. and Olena J. Goodwin House	December 4, 1998 (#98001453)	80 West 400 North; 40°23′34″N 111°50′59″W	Lehi	
68	Samuel Green House	Samuel Green House	June 9, 1987 (#87000827)	264 East 200 South; 40°21′40″N 111°44′07″W	Pleasant Grove	
69	John Hafen House	John Hafen House	July 23, 1982 (#82004182)	1002 South Main Street; 40°09′14″N 111°36′33″W	Springville	
70	Alfred William Harper House	Alfred William Harper House	June 9, 1987 (#87000828)	125 West 400 North; 40°20′40″N 111°43′01″W	Lindon	
71	Harrington Elementary School	Harrington Elementary School	March 4, 1993 (#93000064)	50 North Center Street; 40°22′40″N 111°47′50″W	American Fork	
72	James and Emily Herbert House	James and Emily Herbert House	January 18, 2018 (#100001983)	388 W Main Street; 40°22′37″N 111°48′31″W	American Fork	
73	Hines Mansion	Hines Mansion	July 12, 1978 (#78002702)	125 South 400 West; 40°14′03″N 111°39′51″W	Provo	
74	Lars and Agnes Jensen House	Lars and Agnes Jensen House	December 30, 1999 (#99001627)	87 North 800 West; 40°17′55″N 111°42′54″W	Orem	
75	Mont and Harriet Johnson House	Mont and Harriet Johnson House	January 5, 1998 (#97001570)	153 East 400 North; 40°10′22″N 111°36′25″W	Springville	
76	Peter Axel Johnson House	Peter Axel Johnson House	October 22, 1984 (#84000164)	1075 North 100 East; 40°22′30″N 111°44′21″W	Pleasant Grove	
77	Johnson-Hansen House	Johnson-Hansen House	December 1, 1994 (#94001346)	485 East 400 South; 40°13′43″N 111°38′50″W	Provo	
78	Johnson-Kearns Hotel	Johnson-Kearns Hotel	January 5, 1998 (#97001571)	94 West 200 South; 40°09′52″N 111°36′40″W	Springville	
79	David H. Jones House	David H. Jones House	October 24, 1985 (#85003392)	143 South Main Street; 40°06′29″N 111°38′54″W	Spanish Fork	
80	T.R. Kelly House	T.R. Kelly House	December 9, 1983 (#83003972)	164 West 200 South; 40°09′51″N 111°36′46″W	Springville	
81	Nephi and Annie Kindred House	Nephi and Annie Kindred House	January 5, 1998 (#97001573)	188 West Center Street; 40°10′01″N 111°36′46″W	Springville	
82	Knight Block	Knight Block	December 2, 1977 (#77001322)	1-13 East Center Street and 20-24 North University Avenue; 40°14′03″N 111°39′27″W	Provo	
83	Amanda Knight Hall	Amanda Knight Hall	September 15, 2021 (#100006910)	42 East 800 North; 40°14′39″N 111°39′29″W	Provo	
84	Jesse Knight House	Jesse Knight House	July 23, 1982 (#82004174)	185 East Center Street; 40°14′02″N 111°39′16″W	Provo	
85	Knight-Finch House	Knight-Finch House	June 11, 1998 (#98000673)	212 South State Street; 40°17′35″N 111°41′34″W	Orem	
86	Knight-Allen House	Knight-Allen House	July 23, 1982 (#82004175)	390 East Center Street; 40°14′00″N 111°39′04″W	Provo	
87	Knight-Mangum House	Knight-Mangum House	July 23, 1982 (#82004176)	381 East Center Street; 40°14′02″N 111°39′04″W	Provo	
88	Christian and Sarah Knudsen House	Christian and Sarah Knudsen House	December 4, 1998 (#98001458)	123 South Center Street; 40°23′11″N 111°50′56″W	Lehi	
89	Lakeview Tithing Office	Lakeview Tithing Office	January 25, 1985 (#85000289)	1675 North Geneva Road; 40°15′21″N 111°42′35″W	Provo	
90	Christen Larsen House	Christen Larsen House	July 13, 1987 (#87001178)	990 North 400 East; 40°22′29″N 111°43′54″W	Pleasant Grove	
91	Neils Peter Larsen House	Neils Peter Larsen House	June 9, 1987 (#87000829)	1146 North 100 East; 40°22′35″N 111°44′18″W	Pleasant Grove	
92	Lehi City Hall	Lehi City Hall	March 1, 1982 (#82004169)	51 North Center Street; 40°23′19″N 111°50′56″W	Lehi	
93	Lehi Main Street Historic District	Lehi Main Street Historic District	December 10, 1998 (#98001450)	Roughly along Main Street, between 200 West and Center Street, and 51 North Center Street; 40°23′17″N 111°51′00″W	Lehi	
94	Lehi North Branch Meetinghouse	Lehi North Branch Meetinghouse	December 4, 1998 (#98001455)	1190 North 500 West; 40°23′34″N 111°51′19″W	Lehi	
95	Lehi Roller Mills	Lehi Roller Mills	May 26, 1994 (#94000535)	700 East Main Street; 40°23′21″N 111°50′08″W	Lehi	
96	Lehi Ward Tithing Barn-Centennial Hall	Lehi Ward Tithing Barn-Centennial Hall	December 4, 1998 (#98001456)	651 North 200 East, rear 40°23′45″N 111°50′42″W	Lehi	
97	Lewis Terrace		April 7, 1983 (#83003197)	68-82 North 700 East; 40°14′34″N 111°39′22″W	Provo	
98	John S. and Izola Lewis House	John S. and Izola Lewis House	June 11, 1998 (#98000671)	343 East 720 South; 40°17′04″N 111°41′12″W	Orem	
99	Lime Kilns		March 14, 1979 (#79003490)	Homansville Canyon; 39°58′40″N 112°04′37″W	Dividend	
100	Loveless House	Loveless House	September 9, 2010 (#10000729)	509 East 800 South; 40°16′57″N 111°40′59″W	Orem	Orem, Utah MPS
101	Maeser School	Maeser School	July 26, 1982 (#82004177)	150 South 500 East; 40°13′52″N 111°38′57″W	Provo	
102	McBride-Sims Garage	McBride-Sims Garage	June 11, 1998 (#98000664)	600 North State Street; 40°18′30″N 111°41′56″W	Orem	
103	William H. and Sarah D. Meneray House	William H. and Sarah D. Meneray House	January 5, 1998 (#97001574)	190 South 200 West; 40°09′52″N 111°36′49″W	Springville	
104	Harry B. Merrihew Drugstore	Harry B. Merrihew Drugstore	July 23, 1982 (#82004170)	100 West and Main Street; 40°23′16″N 111°51′10″W	Lehi	
105	David Morgan House	David Morgan House	February 19, 1982 (#82004167)	Center Street and 200 South; 39°56′54″N 111°54′01″W	Goshen	
106	Moyle House and Indian Tower	Moyle House and Indian Tower	December 23, 1992 (#92001689)	606 East 770 North; 40°27′52″N 111°45′58″W	Alpine	
107	Ami and Amanda Oakley House	Ami and Amanda Oakley House	January 5, 1998 (#97001575)	219 East 400 North; 40°10′21″N 111°36′20″W	Springville	
108	Old Goshen Site		August 26, 1980 (#80003976)	Address Restricted	Goshen	
109	Olmsted Station Powerhouse	Olmsted Station Powerhouse	June 26, 1972 (#72001262)	1018 North 1630 East; 40°18′57″N 111°39′14″W	Orem	
110	Joseph Olpin House	Joseph Olpin House	November 7, 1977 (#77001320)	510 Locust Avenue; 40°21′28″N 111°43′41″W	Pleasant Grove	
111	Lars and Christina Olsen House	Lars and Christina Olsen House	June 11, 1998 (#98000669)	417 South 800 East; 40°17′22″N 111°40′50″W	Orem	
112	Milan and Margaret Packard House	Milan and Margaret Packard House	January 5, 1998 (#97001576)	110 West 100 South; 40°09′56″N 111°36′43″W	Springville	
113	Payson Historic District	Payson Historic District	July 3, 2007 (#07000666)	Roughly bounded by 500 North, 300 East, 500 South, and 400 West; 40°02′37″N 111°43′56″W	Payson	The district includes the Christopher Dixon house (pictured) and the John Dixon and Samuel Douglass houses as contributing properties.
114	Payson Presbyterian Church	Payson Presbyterian Church	March 27, 1986 (#86000610)	160 South Main Street; 40°02′07″N 111°43′54″W	Payson	
115	People's Co-op Building	People's Co-op Building	December 4, 1998 (#98001457)	151 East State Street; 40°23′50″N 111°50′47″W	Lehi	
116	Peteetneet School	Peteetneet School	May 30, 1990 (#90000795)	50 North 500 East; 40°02′36″N 111°43′24″W	Payson	
117	Pleasant Grove Historic District	Pleasant Grove Historic District	December 13, 1995 (#95001434)	Roughly bounded by 100 North, 500 South, 300 East, and 100 West; 40°21′43″N 111°44′17″W	Pleasant Grove	
118	Pleasant Grove School	Pleasant Grove School	February 20, 1980 (#80003978)	65 South 100 East; 40°21′48″N 111°44′14″W	Pleasant Grove	
119	Pleasant Grove Tithing Office	Pleasant Grove Tithing Office	January 25, 1985 (#85000288)	7 South 300 East; 40°21′50″N 111°44′04″W	Pleasant Grove	
120	Pleasant Grove Town Hall	Pleasant Grove Town Hall	June 27, 1985 (#85001391)	107 South 100 East; 40°21′44″N 111°44′15″W	Pleasant Grove	
121	Provo Canyon Guard Quarters	Provo Canyon Guard Quarters	June 12, 1986 (#86001291)	Off U.S. Route 189; 40°20′23″N 111°36′44″W	Provo Canyon	
122	Provo Community Congregational Church	Provo Community Congregational Church	April 5, 2022 (#100007565)	175 North University Ave. 40°14′10″N 111°39′32″W	Provo	
123	Provo Downtown Historic District	Provo Downtown Historic District	May 1, 1980 (#80003980)	Center Street and University Avenue; 40°14′00″N 111°39′32″W	Provo	
124	Provo East Central Historic District	Provo East Central Historic District	November 24, 1998 (#98000281)	Roughly bounded by 100 East, 600 East, 500 North, and 500 South; also roughly bounded by University Ave, 800 North, 900 East, and 600 South, 40°14′01″N 111°39′09″W	Provo	Second set of addresses represent a boundary increase approved March 19, 2026.
125	Provo Tabernacle	Provo Tabernacle	September 9, 1975 (#75001830)	50 South University Avenue; 40°13′58″N 111°39′30″W	Provo	
126	Provo Third Ward Chapel and Amusement Hall	Provo Third Ward Chapel and Amusement Hall	April 2, 1979 (#79002518)	105 North 500 West; 40°14′08″N 111°40′01″W	Provo	
127	Provo West Co-op	Provo West Co-op	July 13, 1984 (#84002429)	450 West Center Street; 40°14′03″N 111°39′56″W	Provo	
128	William H. Ray House	William H. Ray House	July 23, 1982 (#82004178)	415 South University Avenue; 40°13′41″N 111°39′27″W	Provo	
129	Recreation Center for the Utah State Hospital	Recreation Center for the Utah State Hospital	April 9, 1986 (#86000746)	1300 East Center Street; 40°14′01″N 111°37′50″W	Provo	
130	Henry T. and Rebecca Reynolds House	Henry T. and Rebecca Reynolds House	January 5, 1998 (#97001577)	270 West 200 South; 40°09′52″N 111°36′53″W	Springville	
131	John T. and Henry T. Reynolds Jr. House	John T. and Henry T. Reynolds Jr. House	June 27, 1985 (#85001393)	101 East 200 South; 40°09′51″N 111°36′28″W	Springville	
132	Thomas A. Richins House	Thomas A. Richins House	June 9, 1987 (#87000831)	405 North 500 East; 40°22′06″N 111°43′47″W	Pleasant Grove	
133	William D. Roberts House	William D. Roberts House	July 24, 1984 (#84002430)	212 North 500 West; 40°14′12″N 111°39′58″W	Provo	
134	Santaquin Junior High School	Santaquin Junior High School	April 1, 1985 (#85000817)	75 West 100 South; 39°58′26″N 111°46′26″W	Santaquin	
135	Silver Row	Silver Row	August 4, 1982 (#82004179)	621-645 West 100 North; 40°14′06″N 111°40′08″W	Provo	
136	Robert and Mary Ann Singleton House	Robert and Mary Ann Singleton House	January 18, 2018 (#100001984)	740 East 50 South; 40°22′32″N 111°46′41″W	American Fork	
137	Thomas and Eliza Jane Singleton House	Thomas and Eliza Jane Singleton House	January 18, 2018 (#100001985)	778 East 50 South; 40°22′33″N 111°46′36″W	American Fork	
138	Hannah Maria Libby Smith House	Hannah Maria Libby Smith House	February 14, 1980 (#80003981)	315 East Center Street; 40°14′02″N 111°39′07″W	Provo	
139	John Y. and Emerette C. Smith House	John Y. and Emerette C. Smith House	December 4, 1998 (#98001452)	518 North 100 East; 40°23′39″N 111°50′47″W	Lehi	
140	Warren B. Smith House	Warren B. Smith House	June 19, 1979 (#79002513)	589 East Main Street; 40°22′37″N 111°46′55″W	American Fork	
141	Reed Smoot House	Reed Smoot House	October 14, 1975 (#75001831)	183 East 100 South; 40°13′58″N 111°39′16″W	Provo	
142	Spanish Fork High School Gymnasium	Spanish Fork High School Gymnasium	April 1, 1985 (#85000819)	300 South Main Street; 40°06′20″N 111°39′16″W	Spanish Fork	
143	Springville Carnegie Library	Springville Carnegie Library	December 13, 1991 (#91001821)	175 South Main Street; 40°09′51″N 111°36′36″W	Springville	
144	Springville High School Art Gallery	Springville High School Art Gallery	April 9, 1986 (#86000750)	126 East 400 South; 40°09′39″N 111°36′28″W	Springville	
145	Springville High School Mechanical Arts Building	Springville High School Mechanical Arts Building	May 14, 1993 (#93000415)	443 South 200 East; 40°09′37″N 111°36′22″W	Springville	
146	Springville Historic District	Springville Historic District	January 21, 2004 (#03000157)	Roughly bounded by 400 North, 400 East, 800 South, Main Street, 400 South, and 400 West; 40°10′19″N 111°36′43″W	Springville	
147	Springville Presbyterian Church	Springville Presbyterian Church	October 24, 1980 (#80003983)	251 South 200 East; 40°09′47″N 111°36′21″W	Springville	
148	Stagecoach Inn	Stagecoach Inn	May 14, 1971 (#71000857)	18035 West 1540 North; 40°15′41″N 112°05′34″W	Fairfield	Part of Camp Floyd State Park Museum
149	Startup Candy Factory	Startup Candy Factory	October 28, 1983 (#83003973)	534 South 100 West; 40°13′34″N 111°39′35″W	Provo	
150	Stewart-Hills House	Stewart-Hills House	January 21, 2004 (#03001483)	275 East 2000 South; 40°15′40″N 111°41′16″W	Orem	
151	James P. and Lydia Strang House	James P. and Lydia Strang House	January 5, 1998 (#97001579)	293 East 400 North; 40°10′23″N 111°36′15″W	Springville	
152	Superintendent's Residence at the Utah State Hospital	Superintendent's Residence at the Utah State Hospital	April 9, 1986 (#86000748)	1079 East Center Street; 40°14′02″N 111°38′20″W	Provo	
153	George Taylor Jr. House	George Taylor Jr. House	August 9, 1983 (#83004185)	187 North 400 West; 40°14′06″N 111°39′54″W	Provo	
154	Thomas N. Taylor House	Thomas N. Taylor House	July 23, 1982 (#82004180)	342 North 500 West; 40°14′18″N 111°40′03″W	Provo	
155	Thompson Family Farmstead		November 20, 2023 (#100009572)	7421 River Bottoms Road; 40°05′46″N 111°38′47″W	Spanish Fork vicinity	
156	Thurber School	Thurber School	November 5, 2024 (#100011044)	40 S Main St; 40°06′34″N 111°39′18″W	Spanish Fork	Now houses city offices.
157	Timpanogos Cave Historic District	Timpanogos Cave Historic District	October 13, 1982 (#82001760)	2038 Alpine Loop Road; 40°26′25″N 111°42′44″W	American Fork	A boundary increase was approved January 26, 2026.
158	Timpanogos Cooperative Marketing Association Building	Timpanogos Cooperative Marketing Association Building	July 5, 2008 (#08000385)	380 South Orem Boulevard; 40°17′25″N 111°41′40″W	Orem	
159	Tintic Standard Reduction Mill	Tintic Standard Reduction Mill	September 13, 1978 (#78002700)	Off U.S. Route 6; 39°57′26″N 111°51′10″W	Genola	
160	John R. Twelves House	John R. Twelves House	July 23, 1982 (#82004181)	287 East 100 North; 40°14′07″N 111°39′10″W	Provo	
161	Upper American Fork Hydroelectric Power Plant Historic District	Upper American Fork Hydroelectric Power Plant Historic District	April 20, 1989 (#89000278)	Alpine Loop Road; 40°26′16″N 111°43′22″W	Highland	
162	US Post Office-Springville Main	US Post Office-Springville Main	November 27, 1989 (#89002000)	309 South Main Street; 40°09′44″N 111°36′35″W	Springville	
163	U. S. Post Office	U. S. Post Office	September 5, 2017 (#100001573)	88 West 100 North; 40°14′07″N 111°39′36″W	Provo	Also known as the J. Will Robinson Federal Building
164	Utah Southern Railroad Depot	Utah Southern Railroad Depot	June 8, 1994 (#94000536)	222 East State Street; 40°23′48″N 111°50′45″W	Lehi	
165	Utah State Training School Amphitheater and Wall	Utah State Training School Amphitheater and Wall	October 7, 1994 (#94001206)	Roughly 845 East 700 North; 40°23′39″N 111°46′31″W	American Fork	
166	Veterans Memorial Building	Veterans Memorial Building	April 14, 1994 (#94000299)	53 North Center Street; 40°22′41″N 111°47′54″W	American Fork	
167	Edward Wadley House	Edward Wadley House	June 9, 1987 (#87000832)	2445 North Canyon Road; 40°23′25″N 111°44′23″W	Pleasant Grove	
168	Patrick L. and Rose O. Ward House	Patrick L. and Rose O. Ward House	January 5, 1998 (#97001580)	511 South Main Street; 40°09′35″N 111°36′34″W	Springville	
169	Alvin and Grace Washburn House	Alvin and Grace Washburn House	December 30, 1999 (#99001629)	753 North 100 West; 40°18′41″N 111°41′53″W	Orem	
170	Water Lily Shaft		March 14, 1979 (#79003489)	North of Dividend; 39°59′04″N 112°03′13″W	Pinon Creek Canyon	
171	Thomas and Mary Webb House	Thomas and Mary Webb House	December 4, 1998 (#98001451)	388 North 200 East; 40°23′33″N 111°50′42″W	Lehi	
172	Peter Wentz House	Peter Wentz House	April 26, 1978 (#78002703)	575 North University Avenue; 40°14′28″N 111°39′30″W	Provo	
173	Jacob Hanmer White House	Jacob Hanmer White House	June 9, 1987 (#87000833)	599 East 100 South; 40°21′46″N 111°43′39″W	Pleasant Grove	
174	Joseph and Margaret Wilkinson House	Joseph and Margaret Wilkinson House	October 16, 2013 (#13000843)	318 South 800 West; 40°17′30″N 111°42′54″W	Orem	Part of the Orem, Utah MPS
175	Wood-Harrison House	Wood-Harrison House	January 19, 1983 (#83003198)	310 South 300 West; 40°09′44″N 111°36′56″W	Springville	
176	Yankee Headframe		March 14, 1979 (#79003484)	Burriston Pass Road; 39°56′52″N 112°05′49″W	East Tintic Mountains	
177	Yard-Groesbeck House	Yard-Groesbeck House	January 5, 1998 (#97001581)	157 West 200 South; 40°09′51″N 111°36′44″W	Springville	
178	Brigham Young Academy	Brigham Young Academy	January 1, 1976 (#76001839)	550 North University Avenue; 40°14′28″N 111°39′24″W	Provo	Now the Provo City Library
179	William Friend Young House	William Friend Young House	June 9, 1987 (#87000834)	550 East 500 North; 40°22′08″N 111°43′42″W	Pleasant Grove	

== Former listings ==
	Name on the Register	Image	Date listed	Date removed	Location	City or town	Description
1	Big Hill Shaft Headframe		March 14, 1979 (#79003486)	December 4, 1991	Dividend Road; 39°57′14″N 112°04′37″W	Dividend	
2	Stephen and Mary Bunnell House	Stephen and Mary Bunnell House	October 22, 1996 (#96001171)	August 15, 2023	970 South 800 West on the campus of Utah Valley University; 40°16′48″N 111°42′55″W	Orem	Torn down in 2012, some of the materials rebuilt into a smaller replica
3	Davis-Ercanbrack Farmstead		October 2, 1998 (#98001213)	July 23, 2018	2044 South Main Street; 40°15′37″N 111°41′40″W	Orem	
4	Dividend Miner's Dry		March 14, 1979 (#79003488)	December 4, 1991	Dividend Road; 39°57′19″N 112°03′44″W	Dividend	
5	Hotel Roberts	Hotel Roberts	July 26, 1979 (#79002516)	April 28, 2005	192 South University Avenue	Provo	Historic Mission-style hotel built in 1882 that served as a landmark and center of Provo social activity for much of the early 20th century. Demolished in 2004.
6	Jacob Houtz House		August 25, 1978 (#78002704)	October 27, 1982	980 North Main Street	Springville	
7	Iron Blossom No. 3 Mine		March 14, 1979 (#79003479)	December 4, 1991	Burristan Pass Road; 39°55′52″N 112°05′45″W	East Tintic Mountains (east of Mammoth	
8	Benjamin Bullock Kimball House		December 4, 1985 (#85003042)	May 15, 2001	1705 South State Street	Provo	
9	Lehi Commercial and Savings Bank-Lehi Hospital	Lehi Commercial and Savings Bank-Lehi Hospital	December 17, 1998 (#98001537)	March 26, 2018	206 East State Street; 40°23′46″N 111°50′42″W	Lehi	Demolished in 2009.
10	Lehi Fifth Ward Meetinghouse		December 30, 1992 (#92001688)	May 15, 2001	121 N. 100 East	Lehi	Demolished in July, 1995.
11	Nunn Power Plant		December 13, 1979 (#79002517)	April 28, 2005	Off U.S. Route 189	Provo Canyon	
12	Alfred and Rosy Skinner House	Alfred and Rosy Skinner House	June 11, 1998 (#98000662)	October 10, 2023	232 West 800 South; 40°16′57″N 111°42′02″W	Orem	
13	Spanish Fork Fire Station		April 1, 1985 (#85000818)	October 22, 1996	365 North Main Street	Spanish Fork	
14	Spanish Fork National Guard Armory		April 9, 1986 (#86000749)	October 22, 1996	360 North Main Street	Spanish Fork	
15	Stratton House-Orem City Hall	Stratton House-Orem City Hall	June 11, 1998 (#98000674)	September 3, 2009	870 West Center Street; 40°17′53″N 111°42′57″W	Orem	Delisted due to extensive alterations.
16	James E. and Albert Talmage House		February 20, 1980 (#80003982)	December 28, 1994	345 East 400 North	Provo	
17	Verd's Fruit Market Complex		September 9, 2010 (#10000731)	March 13, 2017	1320 North State Street; 40°19′17″N 111°42′16″W	Orem	Orem, Utah MPS

== See also ==
- List of National Historic Landmarks in Utah
- National Register of Historic Places listings in Utah
