= American Fork City Hall =

- U.S. National Register of Historic Places
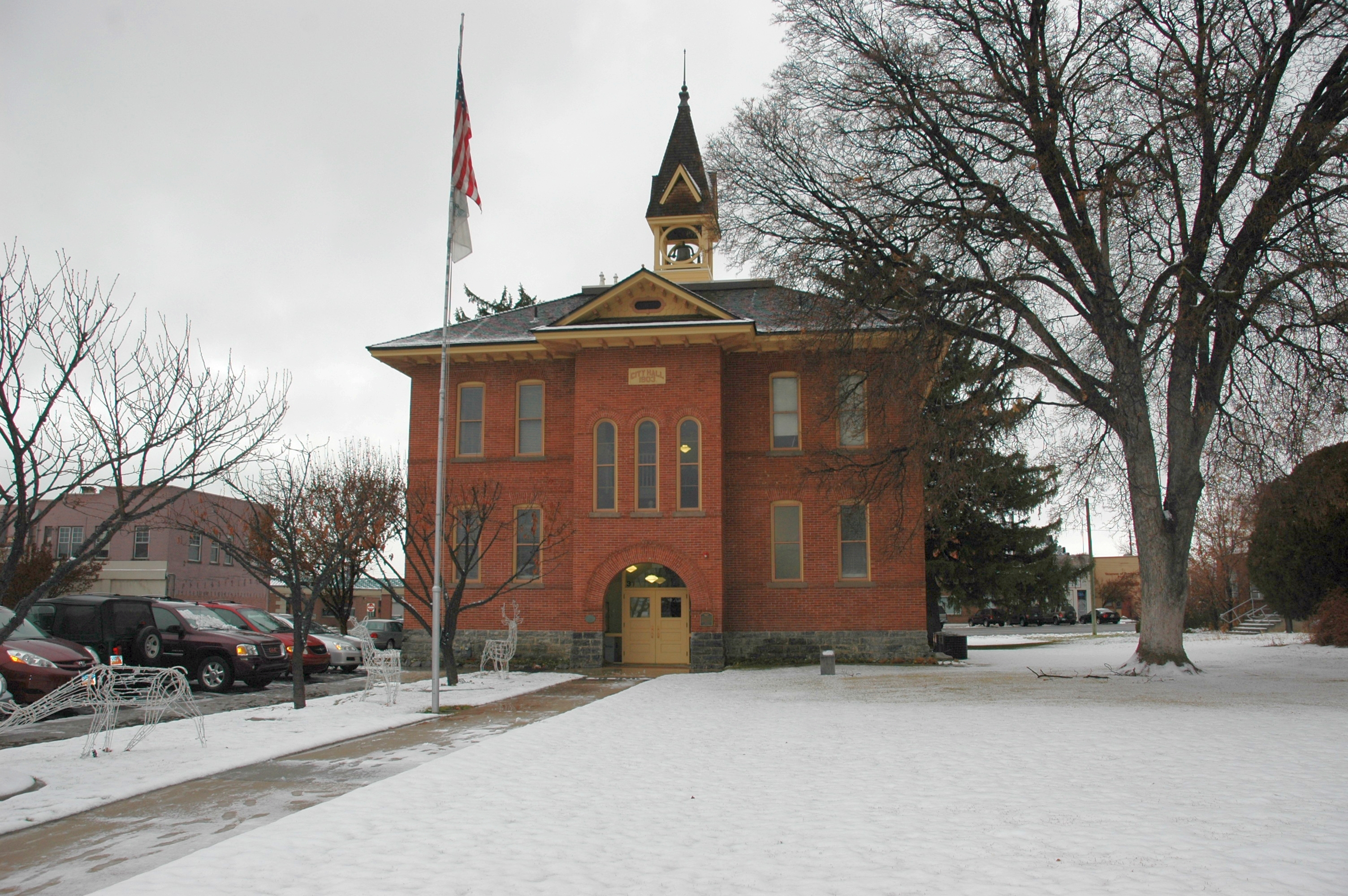

- Location within Utah Location within the United States
- Location: 31 Church Street; American Fork, Utah; United States
- Coordinates: 40°22′39″N 111°47′53″W
- Area: less than one acre
- Built: 1903
- Built by: Pulley, James H.
- Architectural style: Romanesque, Classical Revival
- NRHP reference No.: 94000298
- Added to NRHP: April 7, 1994

The American Fork City Hall on Church Street in American Fork, Utah was built in 1903. It was listed on the National Register of Historic Places in 1994.

== See also ==
- National Register of Historic Places listings in Utah County, Utah
