= Dunn–Binnall House & Farmstead =

Historic house in Utah, United States

- U.S. National Register of Historic Places
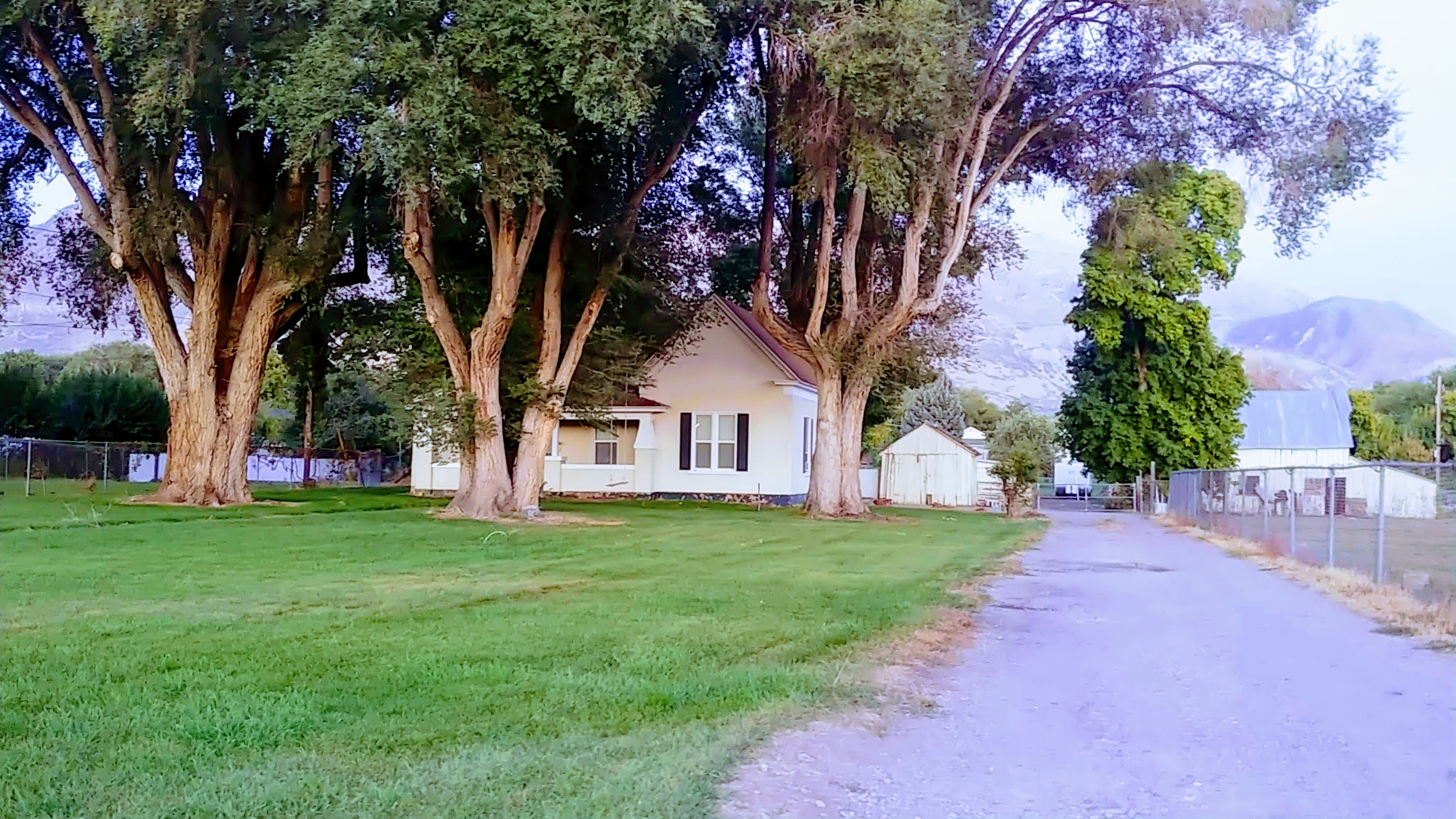
- Dunn–Binnall House, September 2018

- Location within Utah Location within the United States
- Location: 352 North 200 Eest; American Fork, Utah; United States
- Coordinates: 40°23′2″N 111°47′31″W
- Area: 2.2 acres (0.89 ha)
- Built: 1883
- Built by: Dunn, William B.
- Architectural style: Greek Revival, Bungalow/craftsman
- NRHP reference No.: 09001294
- Added to NRHP: February 1, 2010

The Dunn–Binnall House & Farmstead is a historic residence and farm in American Fork, Utah, United States, that is listed on the National Register of Historic Places.

== Description ==
The farmstead, which was built in 1883, is located at 352 North 200 East. It includes Greek Revival and Bungalow/craftsman architecture. It was listed on the National Register of Historic Places February 1, 2010. The listing included eight contributing buildings.

== See also ==
- National Register of Historic Places listings in Utah County, Utah
