= Alpine City Hall =

- U.S. National Register of Historic Places
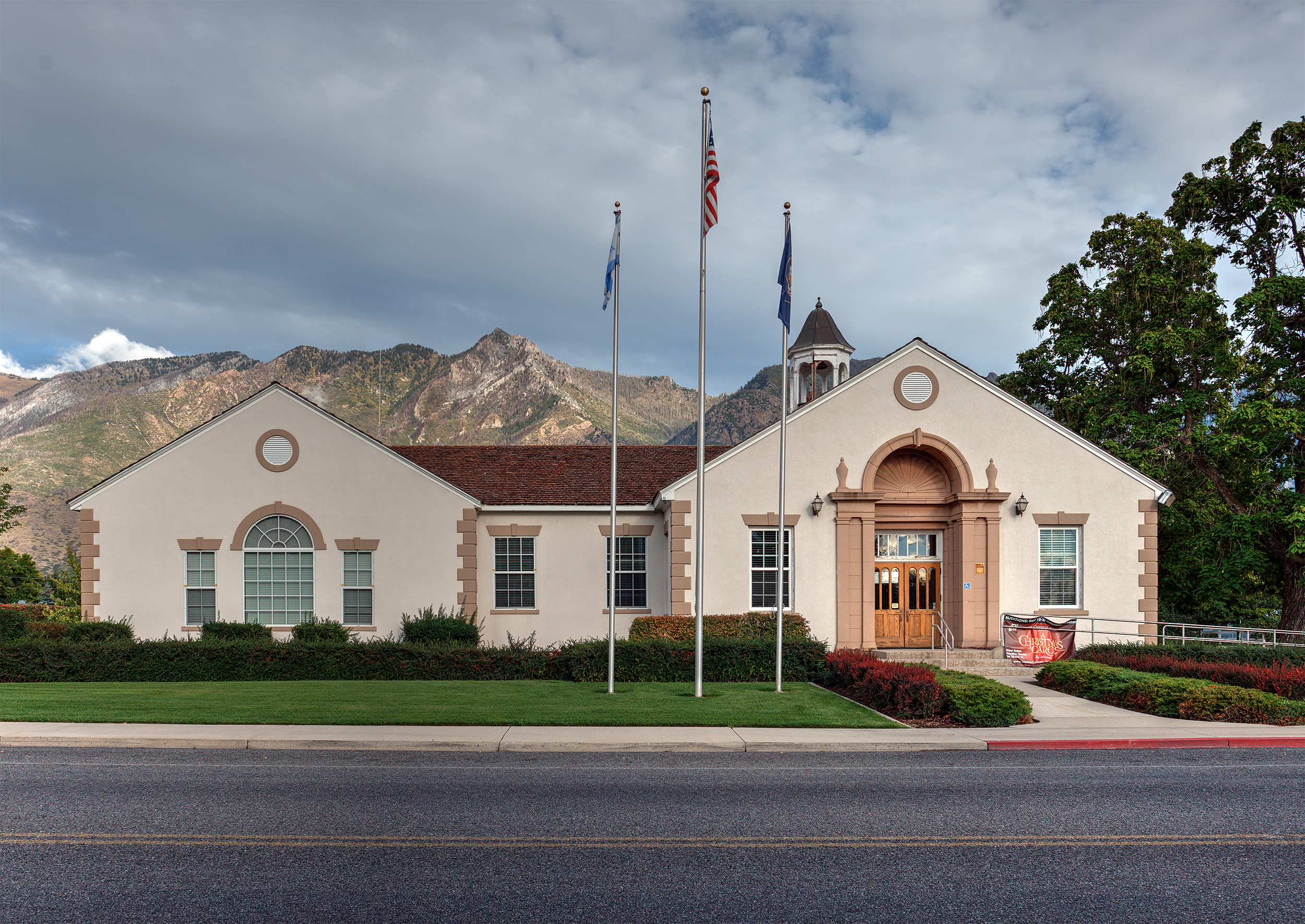
- Alpine City Hall, September 2014

- Location within Utah Location within the United States
- Location: 20 North Main Street; Alpine, Utah; United States
- Coordinates: 40°27′12″N 111°46′36″W
- Area: less than one acre
- Built: 1936
- Built by: Works Progress Administration
- Architectural style: Classical Revival, Colonial Revival
- MPS: Public Works Buildings TR
- NRHP reference No.: 91001820
- Added to NRHP: December 19, 1991

The Alpine City Hall, located at North Main Street in Alpine, Utah, United States, was built in 1936.

== Description ==
The structure includes elements of Classical Revival and Colonial Revival architecture. It was listed on the National Register of Historic Places in 1991.

It is one of 40 buildings in Utah County that was constructed with Works Project Administration depression-era funding. It is also one of few buildings in Alpine having period revival architecture.

== See also ==
- National Register of Historic Places listings in Utah County, Utah
