= Harry B. Merrihew Drugstore =

- U.S. National Register of Historic Places
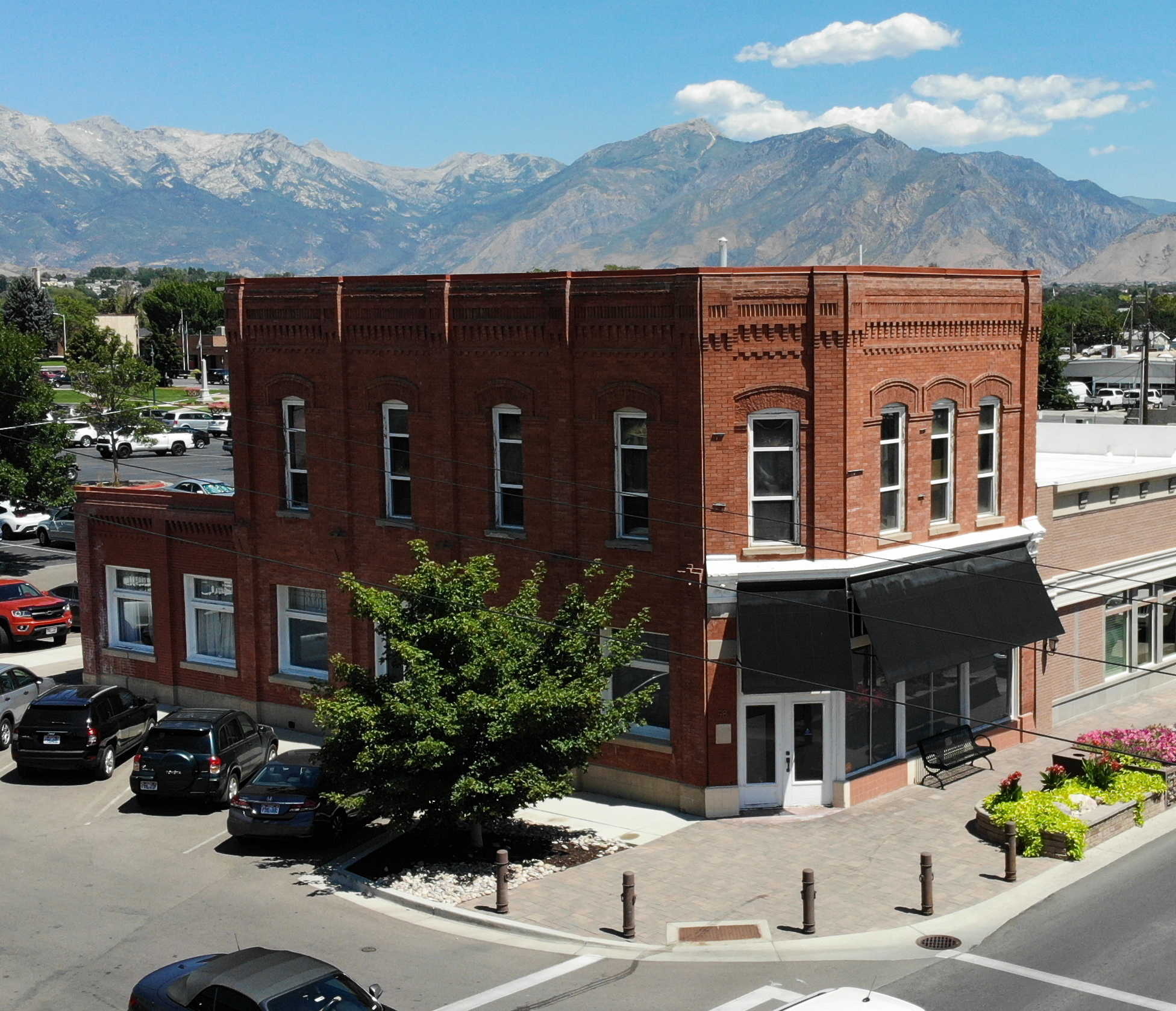
- Harry B Merrihew Drugstore, August 2019

- Location within Utah Location within the United States
- Location: 1st West and Main streets Lehi, Utah; United States
- Coordinates: 40°23′16″N 111°51′10″W
- Area: less than one acre
- Built: 1899
- Architectural style: Early Commercial
- NRHP reference No.: 82004170
- Added to NRHP: July 23, 1982

The Harry B. Merrihew Drugstore, is a historic commercial building in Lehi, Utah, United States, that is listed on the National Register of Historic Places (NRHP).

== Description ==
Located at 1st West and Main streets, it was built in 1899.

It was listed on the NRHP July 23, 1982. When listed, it was one of only two remaining pre-1900 Early Commercial style buildings in Lehi.

== See also ==
- National Register of Historic Places listings in Utah County, Utah
