= George and Temperance Adams House =

Historic house in Utah, United States

- U.S. National Register of Historic Places
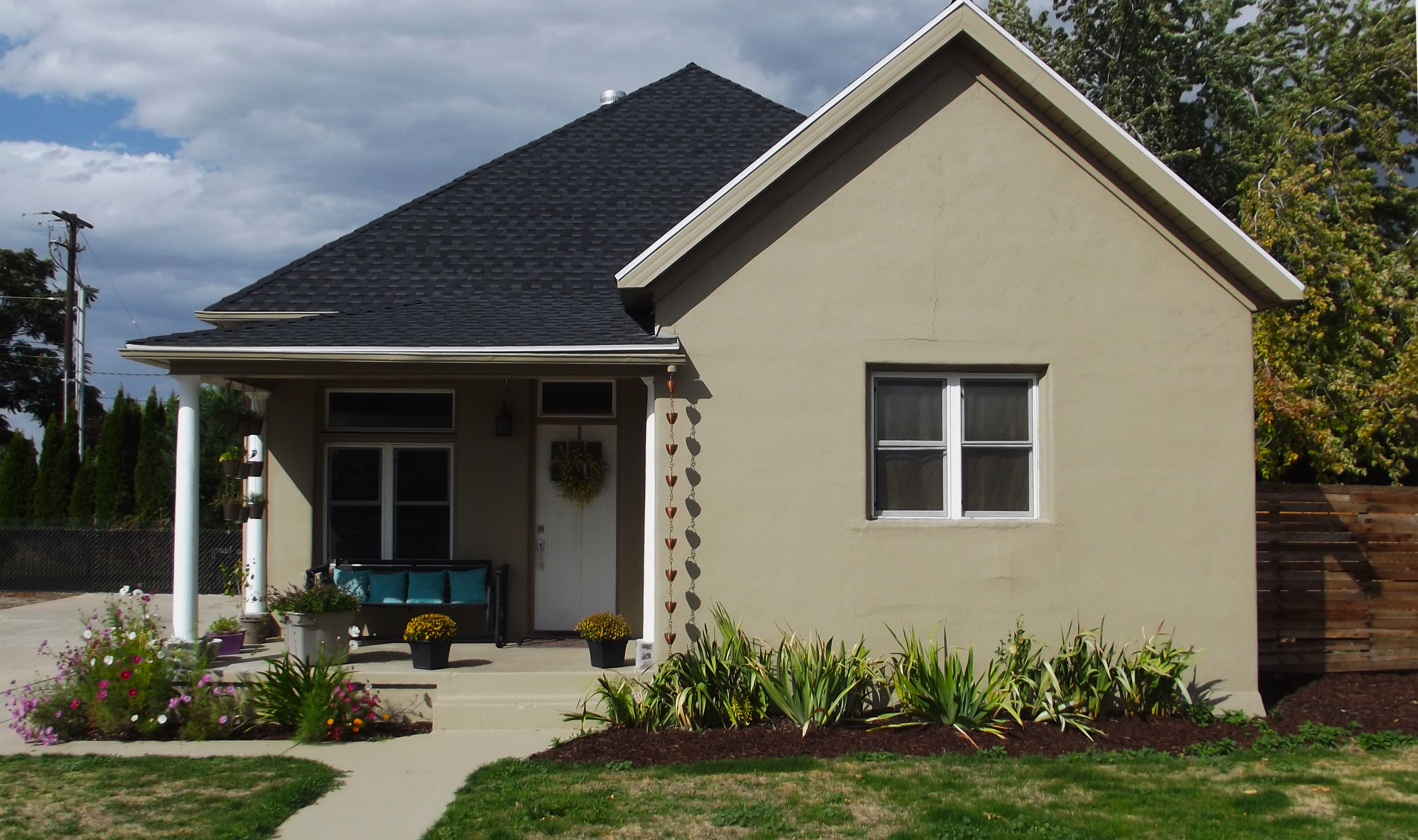

- Location within Utah Location within the United States
- Location: 196 West 400 South, Orem, Utah
- Coordinates: 40°17′25″N 111°41′58″W
- Area: 0.29 acres (0.12 ha)
- Built: 1895, 1903
- Architectural style: Late Victorian, Central block projecting bay
- MPS: Orem, Utah MPS
- NRHP reference No.: 99001628
- Added to NRHP: December 30, 1999

The George and Temperance Adams House is a historic house located in Orem, Utah, United States.

== Description ==
Built in 1895 and expanded in 1903, the Late Victorian-style house is architecturally significant as an example of economic prosperity enabling better building methods. The house is built with brick upon adobe and has more detail than previous common types of homes. Also, the property includes a granary/creamery that "is one of only a few agricultural outbuildings remaining from the early settlement period of Orem."

Originally the property had 5 acres (2.0 ha), but is now a 0.29 acres (0.12 ha) plot of land.

It was listed on the National Register of Historic Places on December 30, 1999.

== See also ==
- National Register of Historic Places listings in Utah County, Utah
