= Lehi Main Street Historic District =

Historic district in Utah, United States

- U.S. National Register of Historic Places
- U.S. Historic district
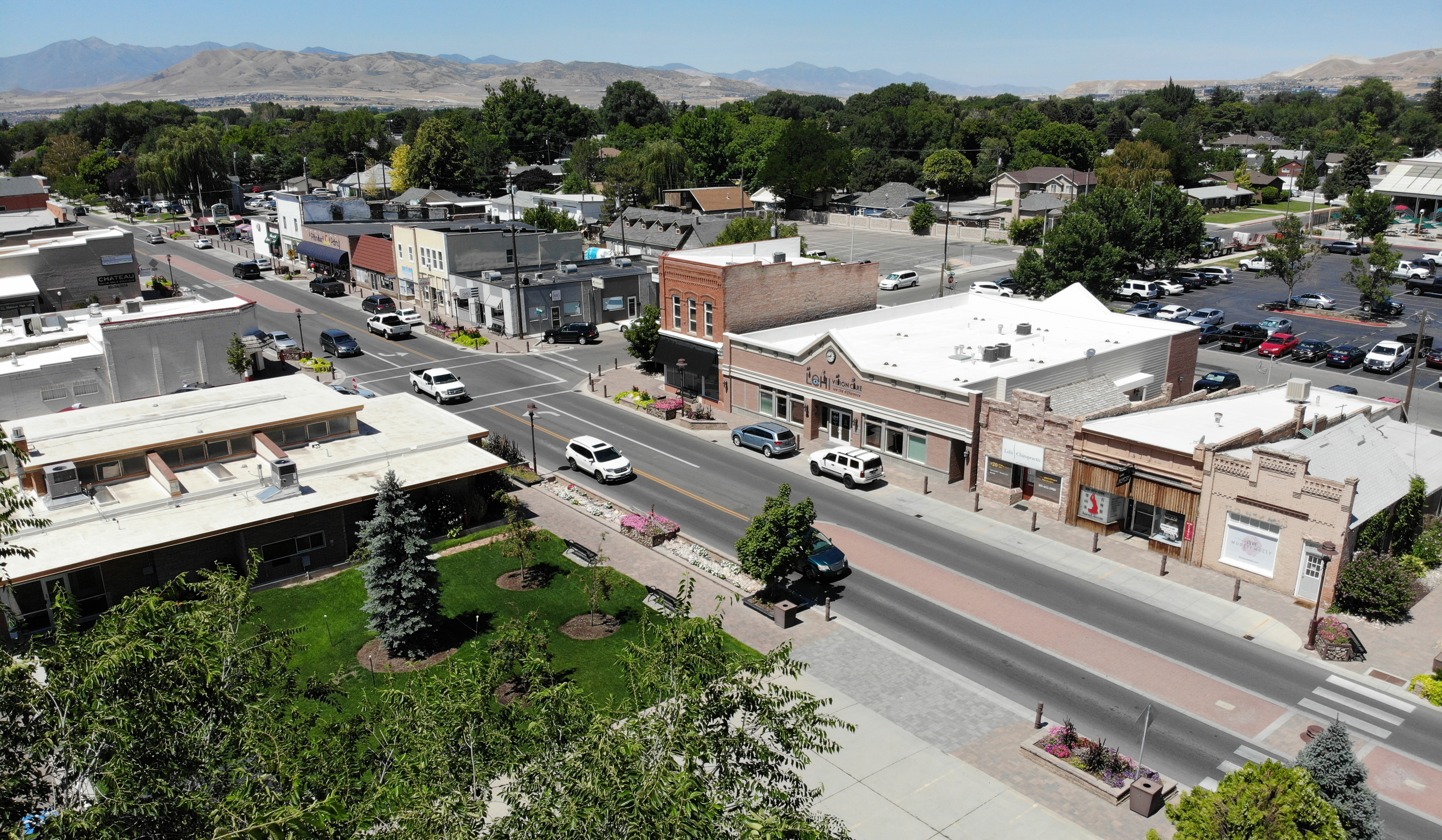
- Lehi Main Street Historic District, August 2019

- Location within Utah Location within the United States
- Location: Roughly along Main Street, between 200 West and Center Streets, and 51 North Center Street; Lehi, Utah; United States
- Area: 5 acres (2.0 ha)
- Built: 1891
- Architectural style: Italianate, Gothic
- MPS: Lehi, Utah MPS
- NRHP reference No.: 98001450
- Added to NRHP: December 10, 1998

The Lehi Main Street Historic District is a 5-acre (2.0 ha) historic district in Lehi, Utah, United States, listed on the National Register of Historic Places (NRHP).

== Description ==
The district includes work dating from 1891, and includes Italianate and Gothic architecture. The listing included 19 contributing buildings.

According to its 1998 NRHP nomination, the district is significant "for its association with and physical representation of Lehi's growth and development through two of the major periods of Lehi's history."

The 19 contributing buildings are:

- 4 West Main Street (1910), Cotter's Grocery
- 12 West Main Street (1920)
- 24/32/36 West Main Street (1915), Racker Block
- 40 West Main Street (1934), Jones Dental Office
- 46 West Main Street (1901), Dorton Butcher Shop, Mountain States Telephone
- 60 West Main Street (1899), Dr. Robert E. Steele
- 68 West Main Street (1914), Lehi Banner Office
- 72 West Main Street (1898–99), Dr. E.G. Merrihew
- 98 West Main Street (1900), Merrihew Drug Store/State Bank of Lehi, separately NRHP-listed in 1982
- 101 West Main Street (1893), Lehi Slaughtering Company Meat Market
- 116 West Main Street (1891), Comer/Knight/Hosier Saloon
- 120 West Main Street (1893–94), Dorton Brother's Meat Market
- 155 West Main Street (1903), Log Cabin Saloon, Larsen's Market
- 162 West Main Street (1919), Lehi Drug Store, Rose Cabaret
- 164 West Main Street (1929), Hertell Building
- 169 West Main Street (1891), Senate Saloon, Lehi Public Library
- 181 West Main Street (1912), Racker Mercantile
- 189 West Main Street (1900), Racker Mercantile
- 51 North Center Street (1918–26), Lehi City Hall

== See also ==
- National Register of Historic Places listings in Utah County, Utah
