= George Angus and Martha Ansil Beebe House =

Historic house in Utah, United States

- George Angus and Martha Beebe House
- U.S. National Register of Historic Places
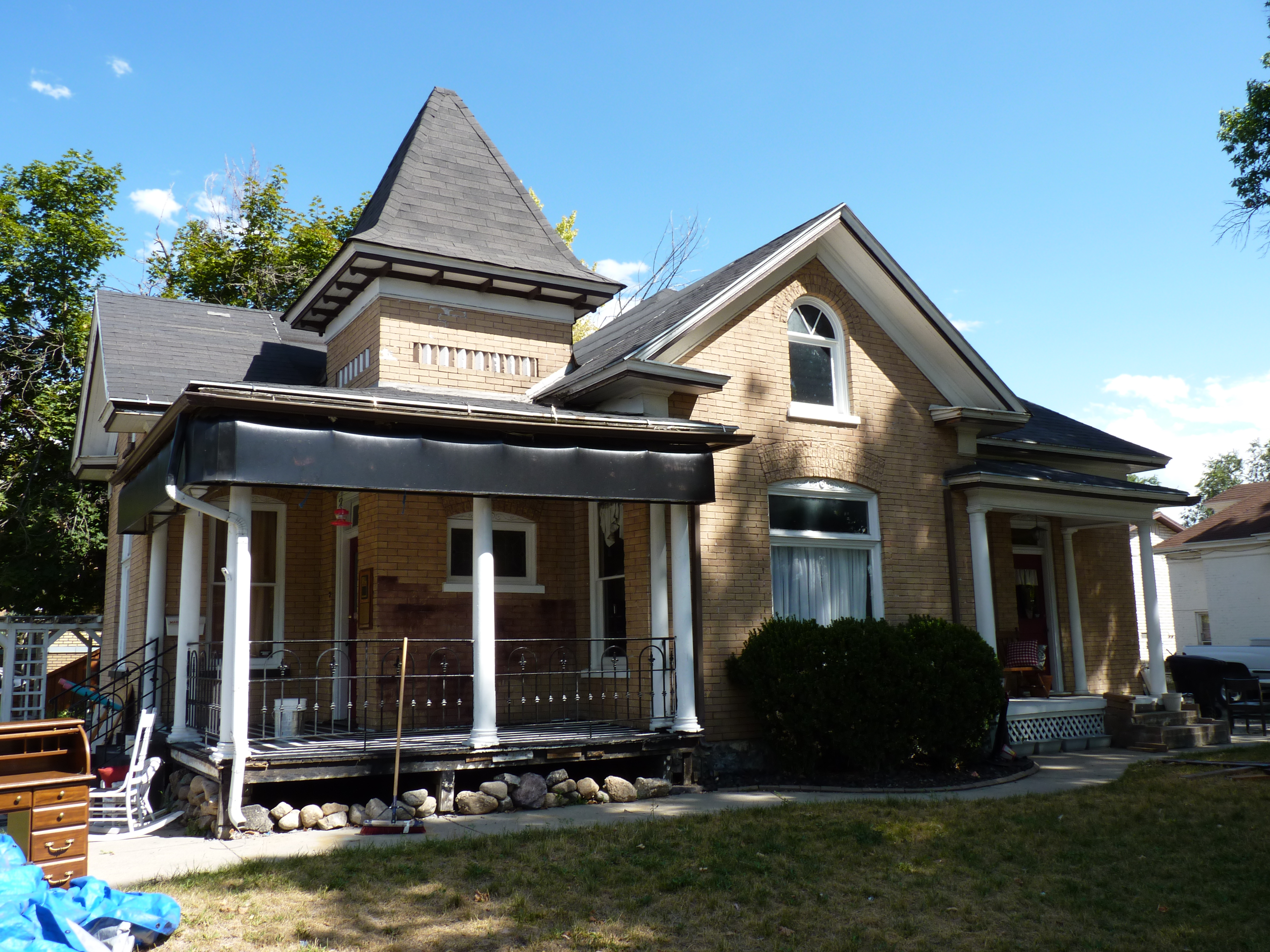
- George Angus and Martha Beebe House

- Location within Utah Location within the United States
- Location: 489 West 100 South; Provo, Utah
- Coordinates: 40°13′56″N 111°39′58″W
- Area: less than one acre
- Built: 1903
- NRHP reference No.: 80003979
- Added to NRHP: October 31, 1980

The George Angus and Martha Ansil Beebe House is a historic house located in Provo, Utah, United States. It is listed on the National Register of Historic Places.

== Description ==
Built in 1903, exemplifying the Queen Anne Style, the Angus Beebe House was constructed for Angus G. Beebe. “The style and substance of the home suggest the aspirations to fashion of many second-generation Provo residents (Historic Provo p. 26).” This home was entered in the national register for the state of Utah on October 31, 1980, and was designated to the Provo Historic Landmarks Registry on March 7, 1996.

=== Physical Appearance ===
Built in 1903, The Angus Beebe House is clearly influenced by the Queen Anne Style, as illustrated by the square, stubby tower with bell-cast roof which extends through the porch roof. The significance of the architecture of this home is not only in the Queen Anne Style as mentioned, but in the complex roof and the short projections from the mains section of the house which creates the slight cruciform plan. The simpleness of the decor of the home, such as the bracketed cornices and the gable sections reflect both modesty and style. Another interesting fact about the structure of this home is that it helps create a symmetrical corner lot. "The two street facades are near mirror images of each other from the corner of the porch to the gabled projection.

=== George and Martha Beebe ===
George Angus Beebe, the man who originally owned this house, was the son of a flour-milling family. Born to parents George Beebe and Hester Ann Rogers Beebe, George was born on February 29, 1872, in Pok City, Iowa. Beebe was at one time employed as a bookkeeper of the Provo Roller Mills and later a founder of the Beebe Lumber company. Eventually, Beebe married a woman named Martha Ansel Barrett Beebe, who died in 1946. George died two years earlier at the age of 72, on March 15, 1944. The home in which he lived is still in good operating condition, especially the interior.

== See also ==
- National Register of Historic Places listings in Utah County, Utah
