= William H. and Sarah D. Meneray House =

Historic house in Utah, United States

- U.S. National Register of Historic Places
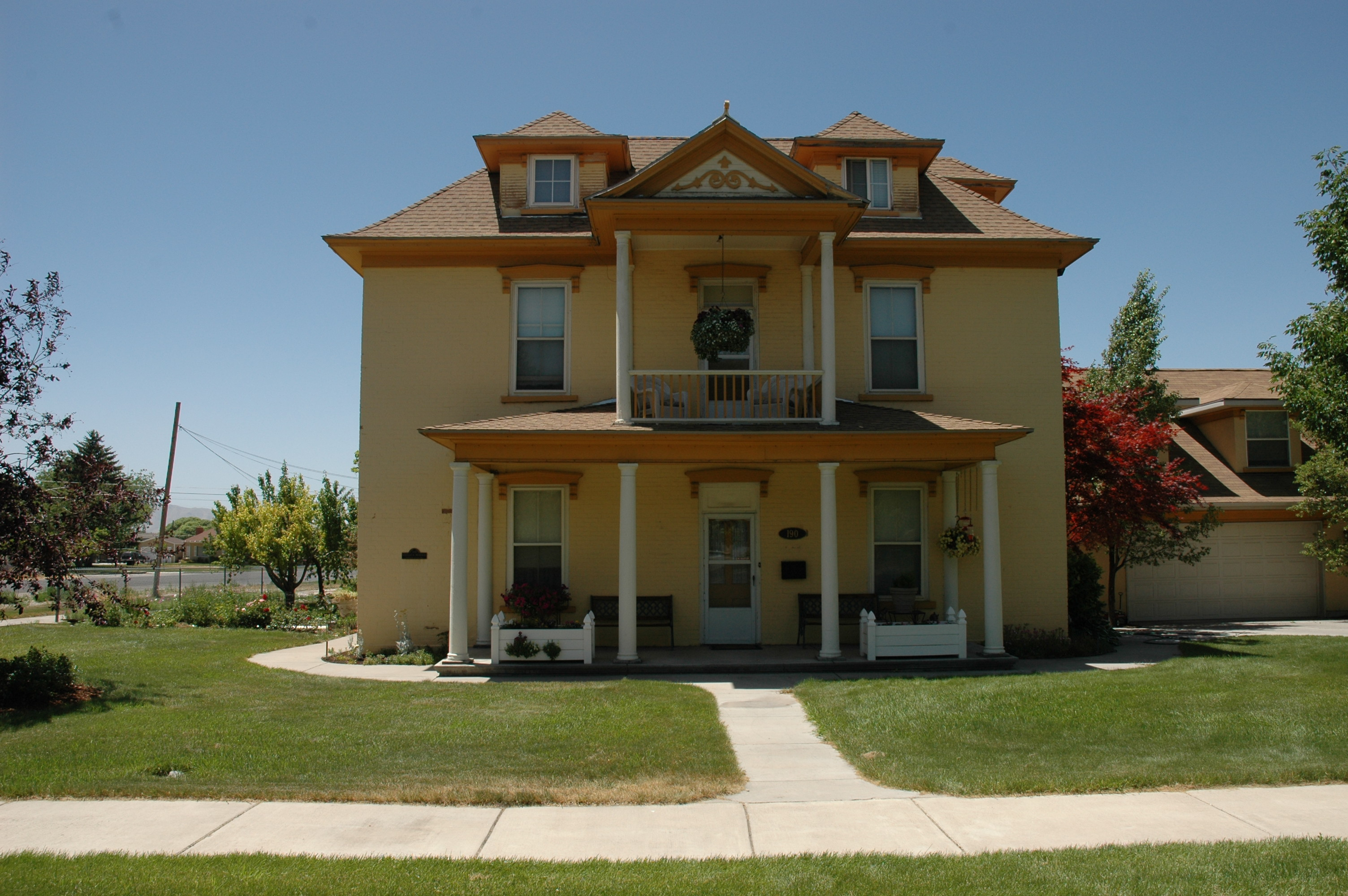

- Location within Utah Location within the United States
- Location: 190 S. 200 W., Springville, Utah
- Coordinates: 40°9′52″N 111°36′49″W
- Area: 0.3 acres (0.12 ha)
- Built: 1885
- Architectural style: Late Victorian
- MPS: Springville MPS
- NRHP reference No.: 97001574
- Added to NRHP: January 5, 1998

The William H. and Sarah D. Meneray House, at 190 S 200 W in Springville, Utah, United States, is a Late Victorian house built in c.1885. It was listed on the National Register of Historic Places in 1998.
