= Edward Wadley House =

Historic house in Utah, United States

- U.S. National Register of Historic Places
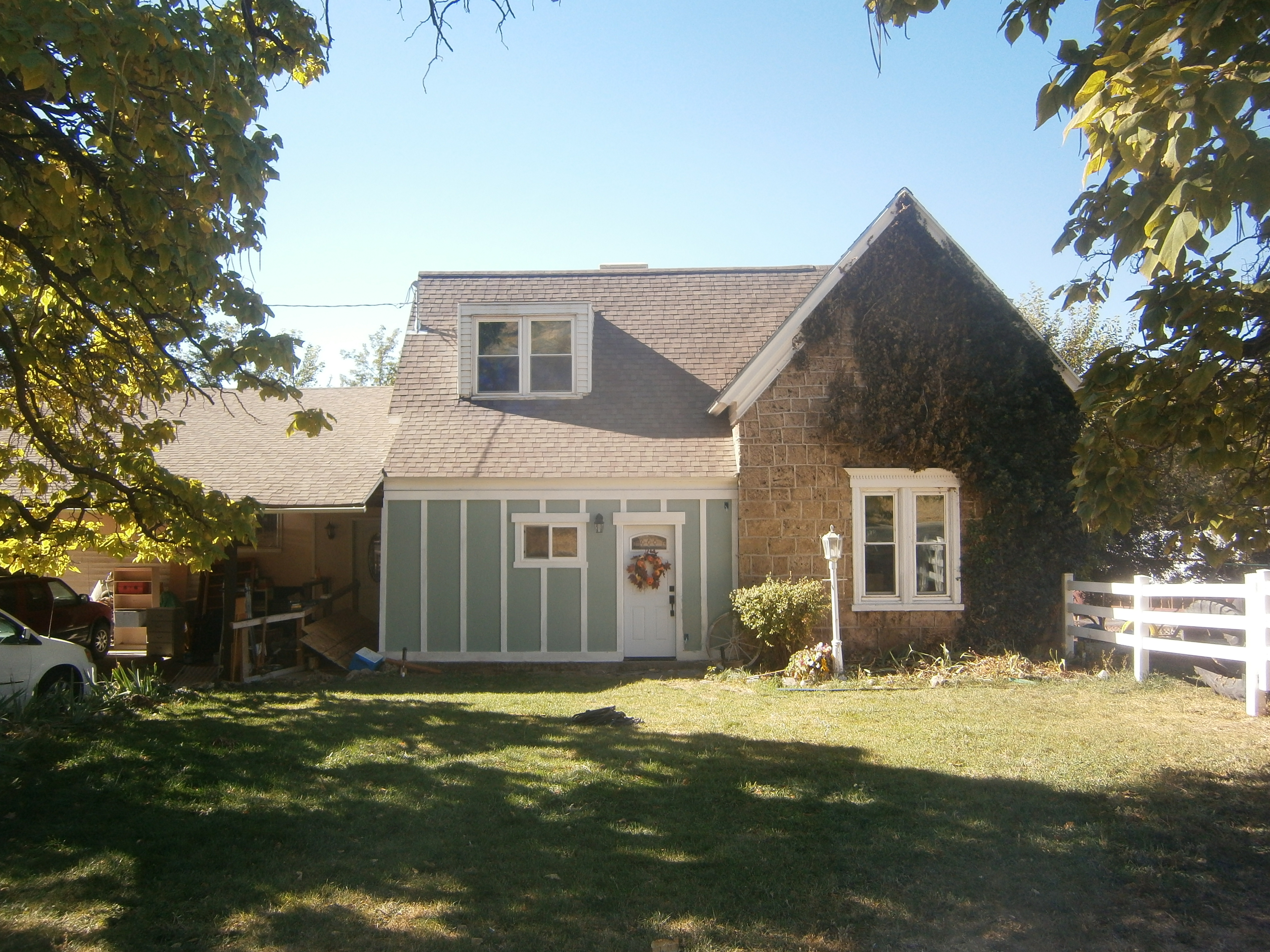

- Location within Utah Location within the United States
- Location: 2445 N. Canyon Rd., Pleasant Grove, Utah
- Coordinates: 40°23′25″N 111°44′23″W
- Area: 2.2 acres (0.89 ha)
- Built: 1893
- Built by: Wadley, William
- MPS: Pleasant Grove Soft-Rock Buildings TR
- NRHP reference No.: 87000832
- Added to NRHP: June 9, 1987

The Edward Wadley House at 2445 N. Canyon Rd. in Pleasant Grove, Utah was built in 1893. It was listed on the National Register of Historic Places in 1987.

It was built of soft rock.
