= Jacob Hanmer White House =

Historic house in Utah, United States

- U.S. National Register of Historic Places
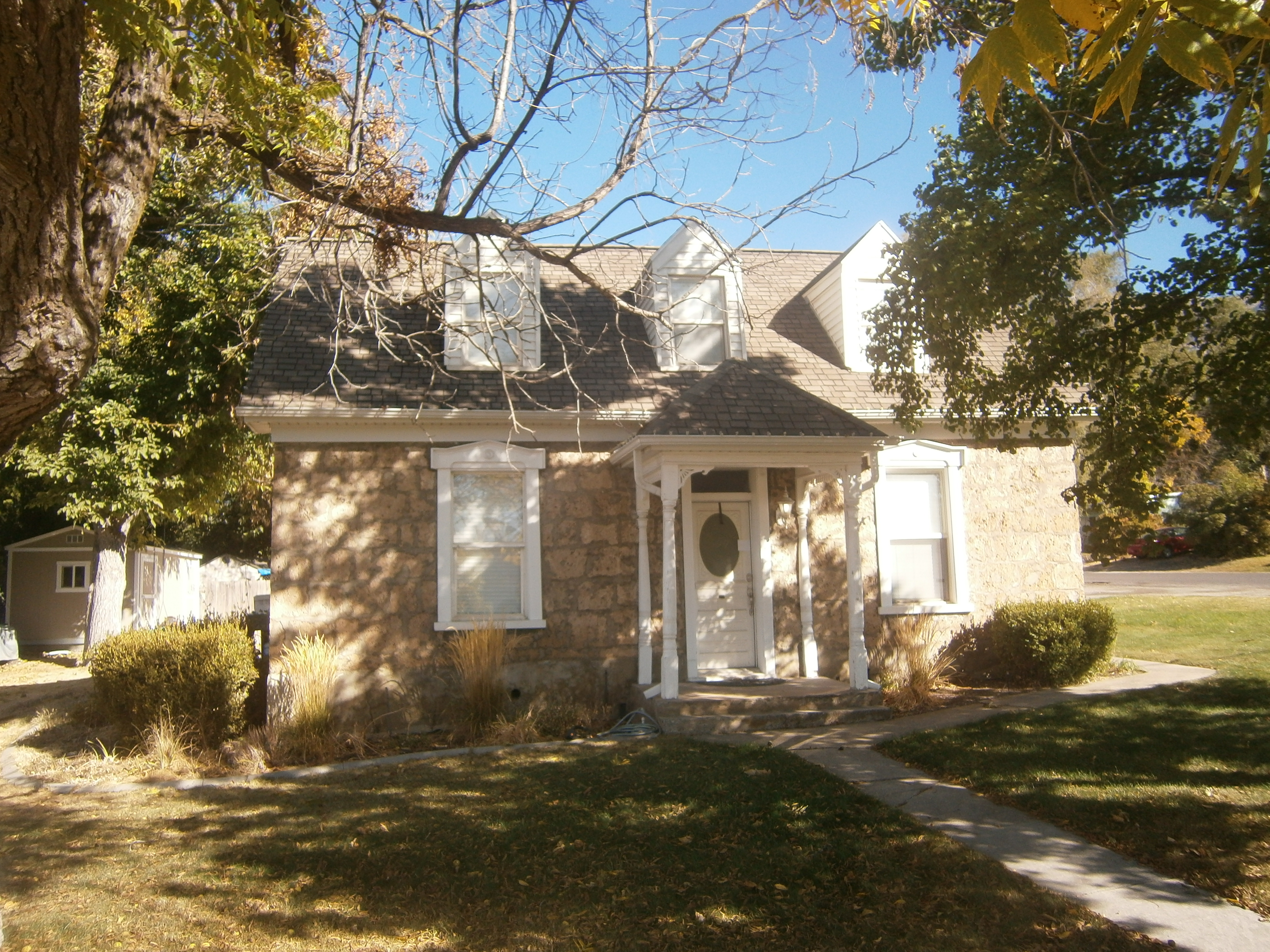

- Location within Utah Location within the United States
- Location: 599 E. One Hundred S, Pleasant Grove, Utah
- Coordinates: 40°21′46″N 111°43′39″W
- Area: less than one acre
- Built: 1874
- MPS: Pleasant Grove Soft-Rock Buildings TR
- NRHP reference No.: 87000833
- Added to NRHP: June 9, 1987

The Jacob Hanmer White House at 599 E. One Hundred S in Pleasant Grove, Utah, United States, was built in 1874. It is built of soft rock. It was listed on the National Register of Historic Places in 1987.
