= Thomas A. Richins House =

Historic house in Utah, United States

- U.S. National Register of Historic Places
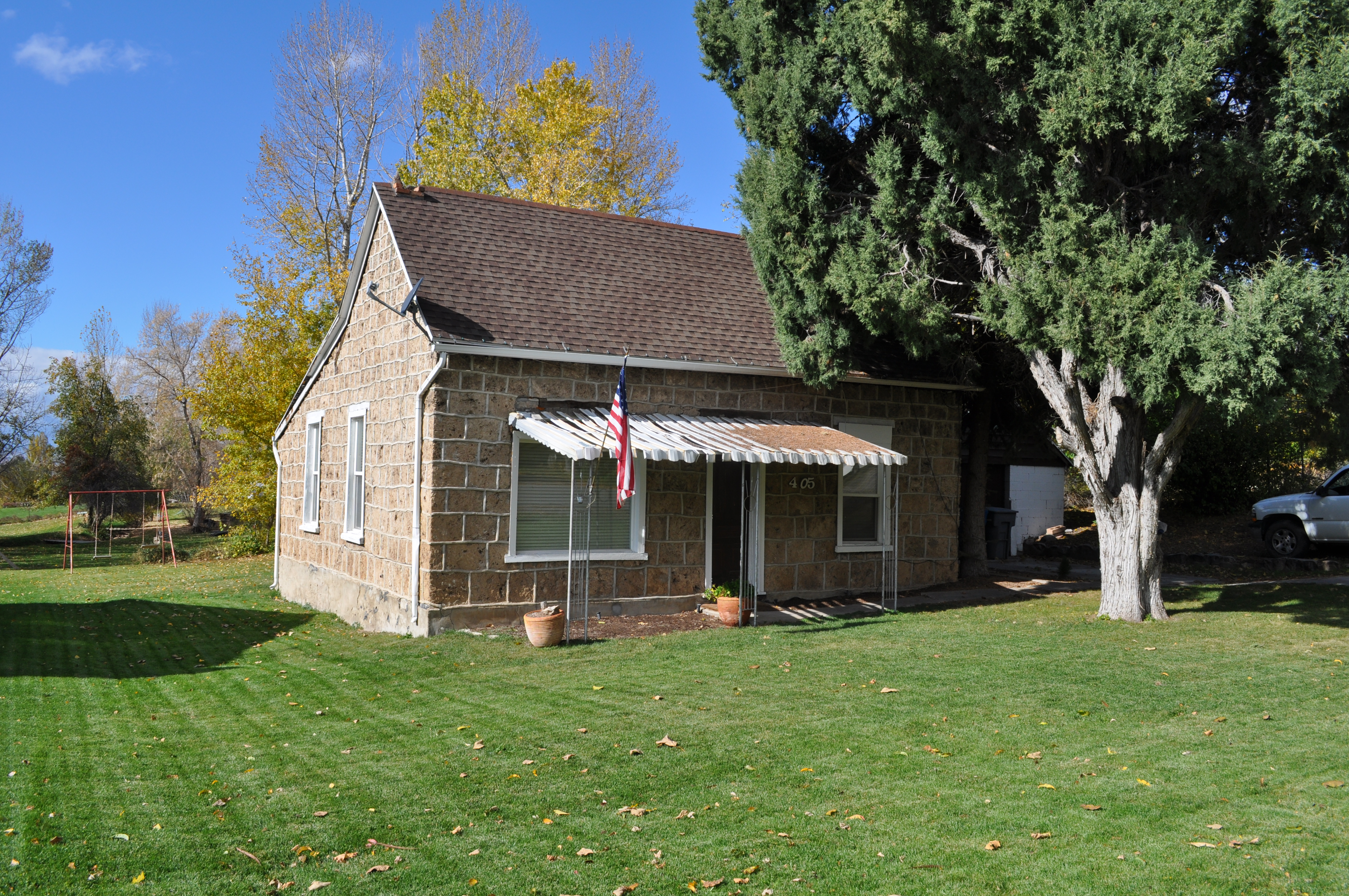

- Location within Utah Location within the United States
- Location: 405 N. Five Hundred E, Pleasant Grove, Utah
- Coordinates: 40°22′6″N 111°43′47″W
- Area: 0.3 acres (0.12 ha)
- Built: 1897
- MPS: Pleasant Grove Soft-Rock Buildings TR
- NRHP reference No.: 87000831
- Added to NRHP: June 9, 1987

The Thomas A. Richins House at 405 N. Five Hundred East in Pleasant Grove, Utah, United States, was built in 1897. It was listed on the National Register of Historic Places in 1987.

It is built of soft rock.
