= William D. Roberts House =

Historic house in Utah, United States

- U.S. National Register of Historic Places
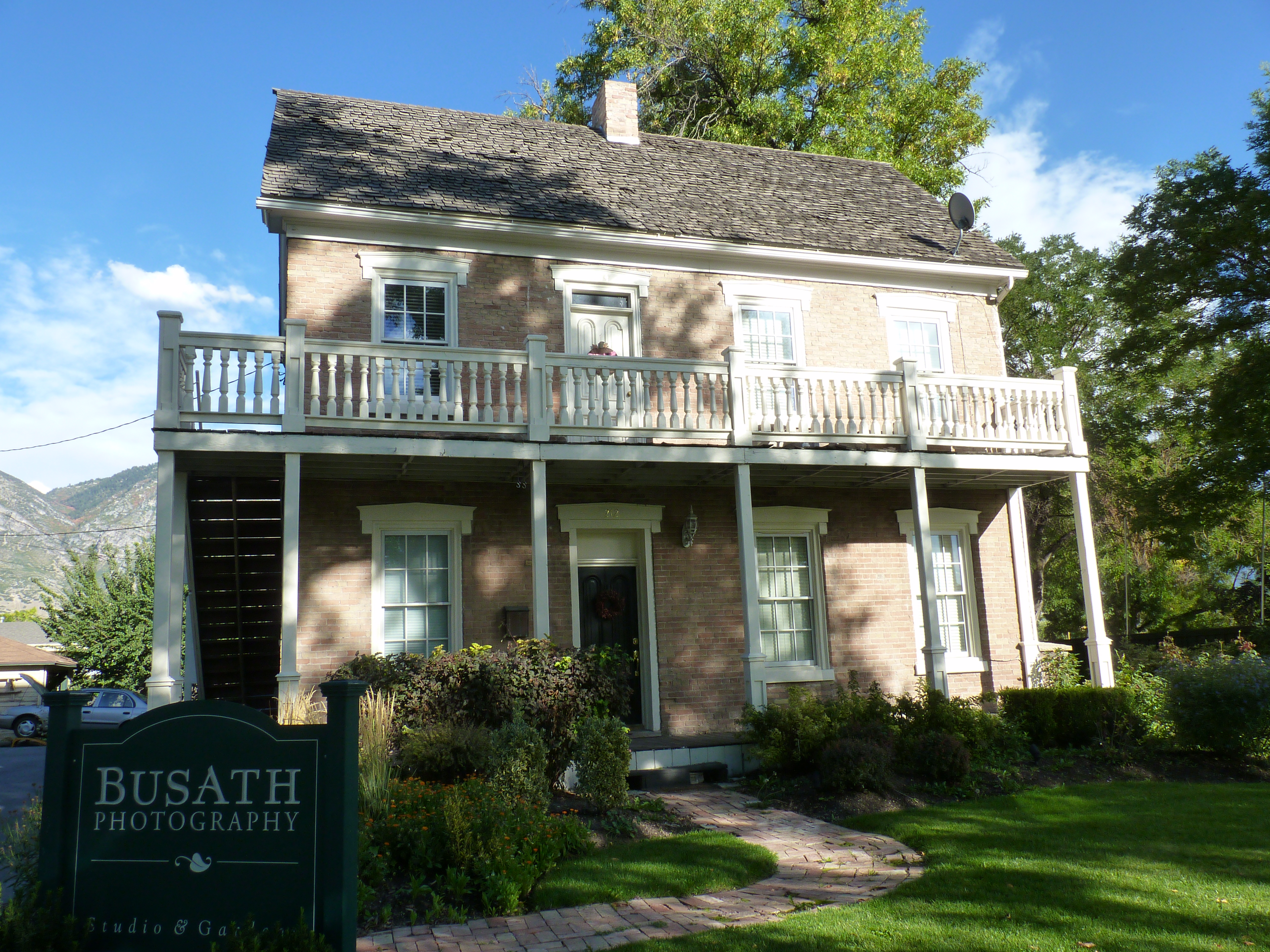

- Location within Utah Location within the United States
- Interactive map showing the location of William D. Roberts House
- Location: 212 North 500 West; Provo, Utah
- Coordinates: 40°14′12″N 111°39′58″W
- Area: 0.5 acres (0.20 ha)
- Built: 1875
- Architectural style: Greek Revival
- NRHP reference No.: 84002430
- Added to NRHP: July 24, 1984

The William D. Roberts House is a historic building located in Provo, Utah, United States. It is listed on the National Register of Historic Places.

William D. Roberts was a central figure in the City of Provo's development. His home, located at 212 North and 500 West, was built in 1875 in the Greek revival style. The William D. Roberts House was designated to the Provo City Historic Landmarks Registry on August 22, 1996. It is currently an art gallery.

== Structure ==
The William D. Roberts house was constructed in 1875. A two-story home with a gable roof, this home is "The best-preserved example in Provo of a house that displays the traditional form and Greek Revival detailing of the pioneer period while concurrently reflecting the increased verticality of the early Victorian influence in Utah (Randall p. 1)." The use of the Greek revival style is evident in the decorative features of the building. The home contains a boxed cornice as well as six over six double hung sash windows with pedimental window heads. The doors also exhibit these window heads. There have been several alterations made to the structure since it was originally made, such as alterations on the facade, and extensions made to the house, the home still retains much of its original character.

== William D. Roberts ==
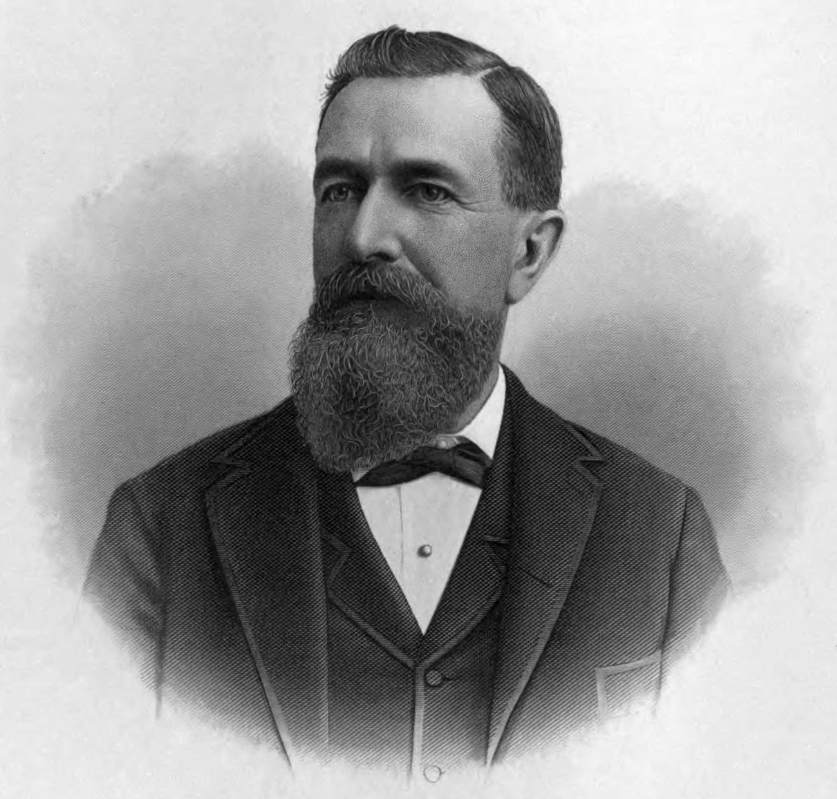
William D. Roberts

Born in Winchester, Illinois, on September 4, 1835, William D. Roberts was approximately ten when his family relocated from Illinois to Garden Grove, Iowa. After a subsequent move to Lancaster, Missouri, his family relocated yet again to Provo Utah in 1851. It was in Provo that William D. Roberts joined the Church of Jesus Christ of Latter Day Saints. Eventually Roberts fulfilled two missions for the church, one in California and one in Great Britain. He also became a member of the Seventies; a general authority in the church. Later in 1851, William, his brother Bolivar, and their father left for California. Once in Placerville, then known as Hang Town, Their father practiced medicine while William and Bolivar mined for a living. This pursuit did not prove as fruitful as planned, as William was not able to afford making it back to Utah until 1855, and at that time only made it with two twenty dollar gold pieces after the four years in California.

Once back in Provo, Roberts fulfilled several assignments of note. Roberts was assigned among a group of men to find Chief Tintic and his company of men, who had been harassing the settlers. Also, Roberts was one of the men who left Utah to help the pioneer Saints make it all the way to Utah when many were trapped within the cold in 1856. In the year 1857, on their way to trade with emigrants in Sweet Water, both Roberts and a man by the name Daniel Jones were abducted by Crow Indians, but rescued the next day by travelers heading towards California. In 1858 Roberts worked in freighting and carrying passengers between Salt Lake City and Los Angeles, California.

On February 6, 1862, Roberts wed Maria Julia Lusk in Lancaster, Missouri, and subsequently he brought her to live with him in Provo. William Roberts became active in the community of Provo, serving as a member of the City council from 1878 to 1881, as an alderman from 1884 to 1885, and as the first postmaster in the state of Utah. He also participated in the first brass band put together in Utah county, as well as in Provo's first dramatic association. William Roberts died at his home in Provo on March 8, 1912.
