= Caffrey and Davis Furniture Company-Senior Hotel =

- Caffrey and Davis Furniture Company--Senior Hotel
- U.S. National Register of Historic Places
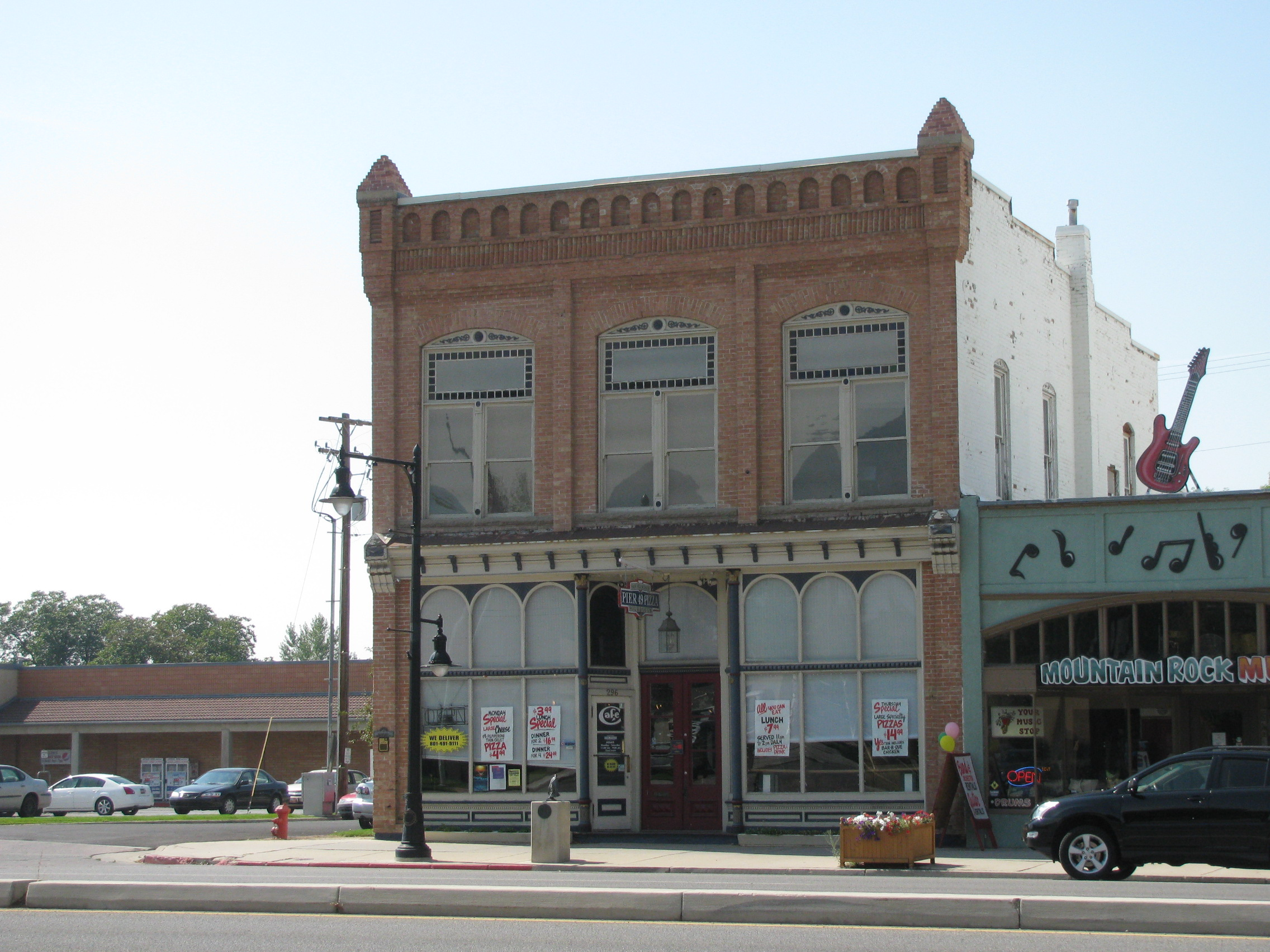

- Location within Utah Location within the United States
- Location: 296 S. Main St., Springville, Utah
- Coordinates: 40°9′48″N 111°36′37″W
- Area: 0.1 acres (0.040 ha)
- Built: 1900
- Architectural style: Romanesque
- MPS: Springville MPS
- NRHP reference No.: 97001578
- Added to NRHP: January 5, 1998

The Caffrey and Davis Furniture Company-Senior Hotel at 296 S. Main St. in Springville, Utah was built in 1900. It has also been known as Caffrey and Davis Furniture Company and as Robinson Bros. Music Co.. It was listed on the National Register of Historic Places in 1998.

The building was first a furniture and music store, then a billiard parlor during approximately 1920 to 1928, and then a hotel into the 1960s.
