= Alpine LDS Church Meetinghouse =

Historic church in Utah, United States

- U.S. National Register of Historic Places
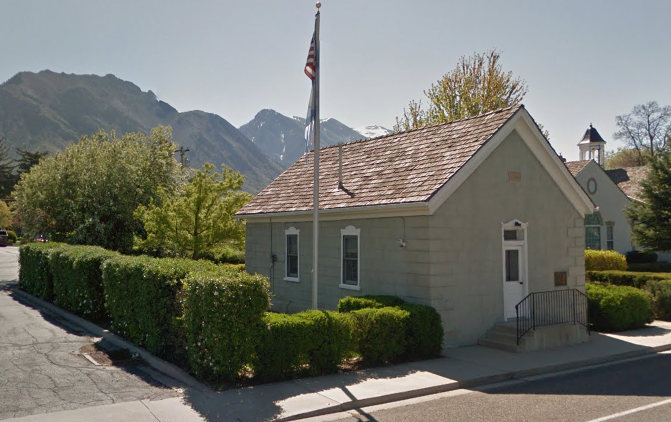

- Location within Utah Location within the United States
- Location: 50 N. Main; Alpine, Utah
- Coordinates: 40°27′14″N 111°46′37″W
- Area: less than one acre
- Built: 1857-1863
- Built by: Thomas J. McCullough
- Architectural style: Greek Revival
- MPS: Mormon Church Buildings in Utah MPS
- NRHP reference No.: 90000794
- Added to NRHP: May 24, 1990

The Alpine LDS Church Meetinghouse at 50 N. Main in Alpine, Utah was constructed during the period from 1857 to 1863. It includes Greek Revival architecture and was built by Thomas J. McCullough and others. It has also been known as Alpine Pioneer Relic Hall. It was listed on the National Register of Historic Places in 1990. It was finished during 1863 and was dedicated later in 1863 by Brigham Young.
