= Lewis Terrace =

- U.S. National Register of Historic Places
- Location within Utah Location within the United States
- Location: 768-782 East Center St, Provo, Utah
- Coordinates: 40°14′34″N 111°39′22″W
- Area: less than one acre
- Built: 1906
- Architectural style: Early Commercial
- NRHP reference No.: 83003197
- Added to NRHP: April 7, 1983

Lewis Terrace is an Early Commercial style multiple dwelling building located at 68-82 N. 700 East in Provo, Utah. It was listed on the National Register of Historic Places in 1983.
