= Samuel I. and Olena J. Goodwin House =

Historic house in Utah, United States

- U.S. National Register of Historic Places
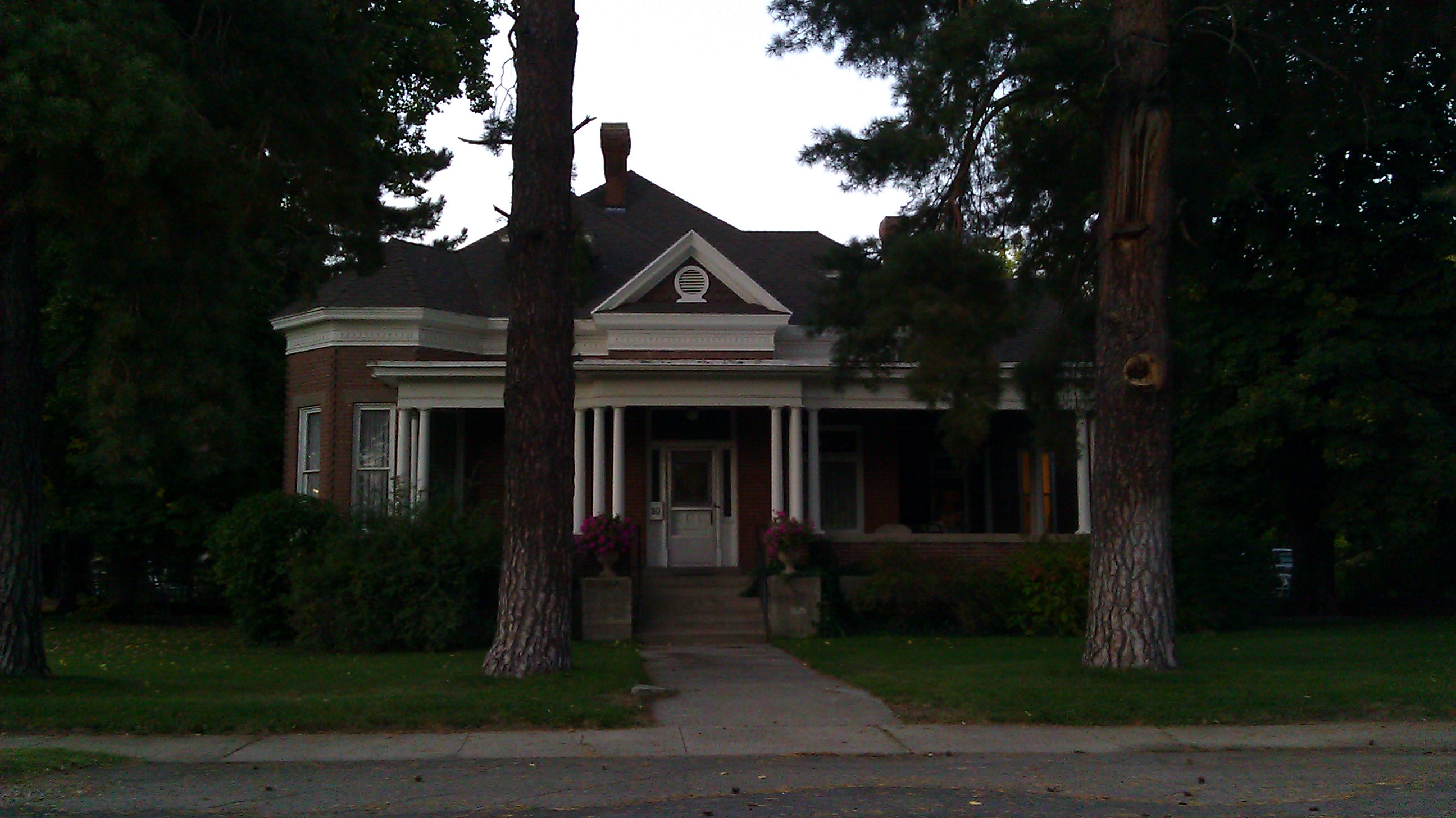

- Location within Utah Location within the United States
- Location: 80 West 400 North, Lehi, Utah
- Coordinates: 40°23′34″N 111°50′59″W
- Area: less than one acre
- Built: 1907
- Architectural style: Late Victorian, Classical Revival
- MPS: Lehi, Utah MPS
- NRHP reference No.: 98001453
- Added to NRHP: December 4, 1998

The Samuel I. and Olena J. Goodwin House at 80 West 400 North in Lehi, Utah, United States, was built in 1907. It was listed on the National Register of Historic Places in 1998.
