= Joseph H. Frisby House =

United States historic place located in Provo, Utah

- U.S. National Register of Historic Places
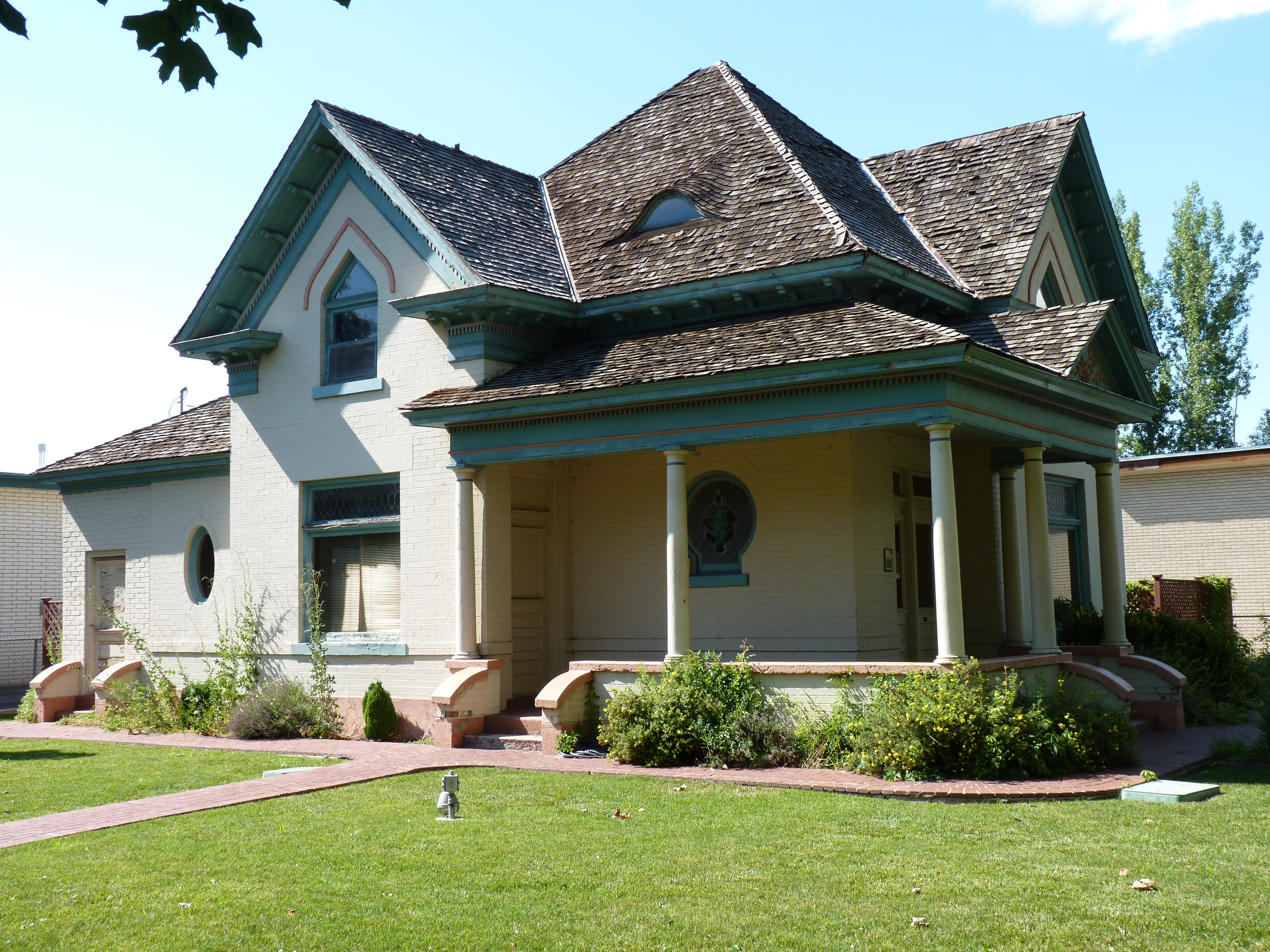

- Location within Utah Location within the United States
- Location: 209 North 400 West, Provo, Utah
- Coordinates: 40°14′12″N 111°39′58″W
- Area: 0.8 acres (0.32 ha)
- Built: 1868
- Built by: Butler, William F.
- NRHP reference No.: 84002428
- Added to NRHP: July 13, 1984

The Joseph H. Frisby House is a historic house located at 209 North 400 West in Provo, Utah. It is listed on the National Register of Historic Places.

This home was built in 1906 for Joseph H. Frisby during the first year of his term as Provo City Mayor. "The House is a somewhat modest Victorian Eclectic house type that was most likely influenced by house pattern books. This house type was not used in Salt Lake City, or in many other areas of the state, but was inexplicably popular in Utah County (Historic Provo p. 8)."

== Structure ==
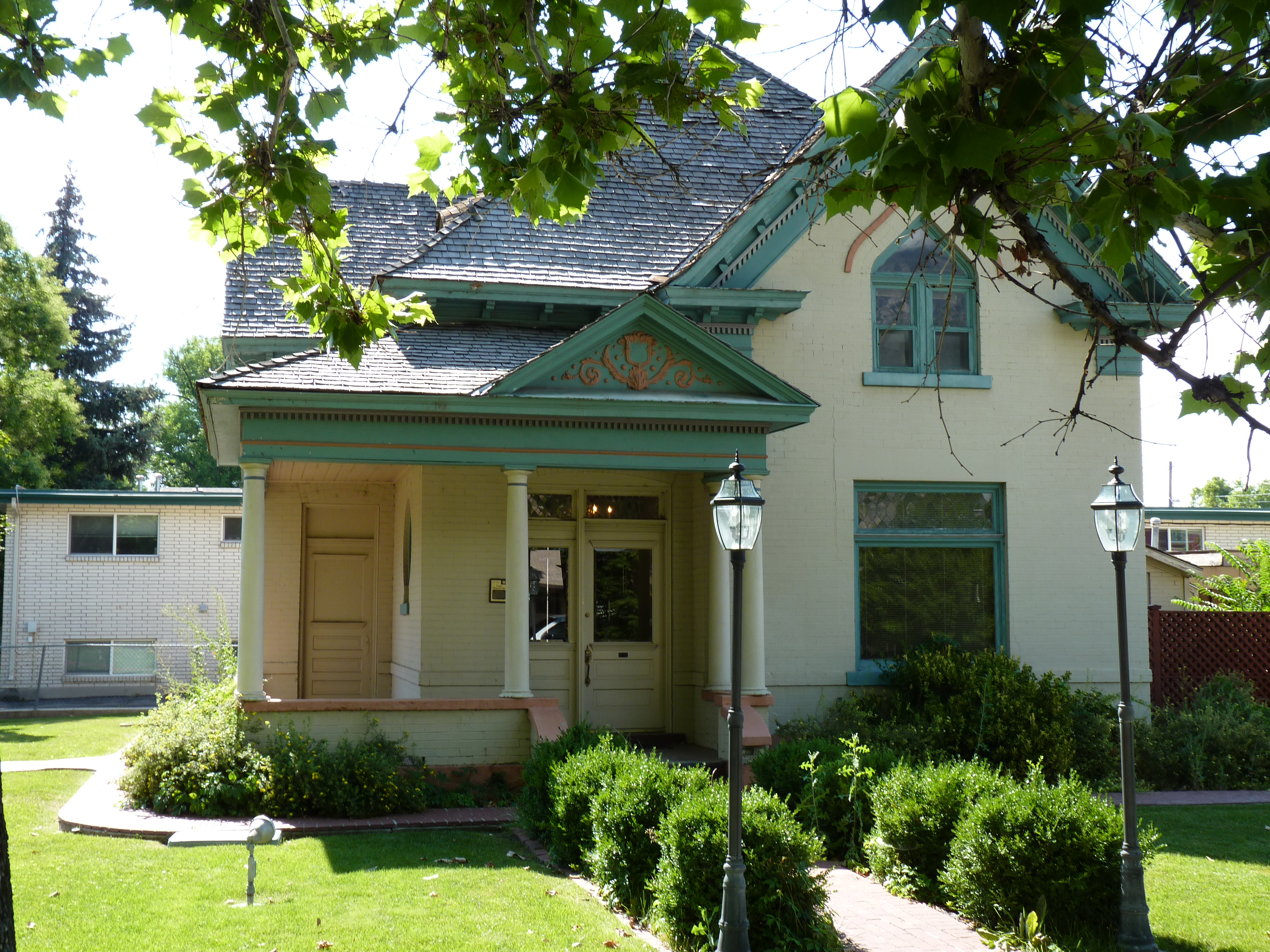
Front

"The Joseph H. Frisby house is a two story brick house with an irregular plan. The irregular plan is determined by the roof configuration of a central pyramid intersected on three sides by projecting gables. A one story porch wraps around the northeast corner of the facade and is terminated at each end by one of the projecting opelted wings. The porch is supported on Tuscan columns that extend from the side of one gabled wing under the eaves of the pyramidal roof to the other gabled wing. Classical detailing appears in the cornice and in the porch. The boxed cornice has brackets and a frieze decorated by dentils. A pediment with Classical Revival decoration on its tympanum and dentils on its frieze is located above the steps leading to the main entrance. Of particular note in the fenestration are the second story windows which have a triangular top above which the brickwork is in the configuration of a four-center ogee and a key-hole, and an oval stained glass window on the south wall of the first floor. A rear extension, which may have been a later addition, was most likely added soon after the original structure was built, and complements the house in its massing and fenestration (National Park Service p.2)."

== Joseph H. Frisby and Charles Hopkins ==
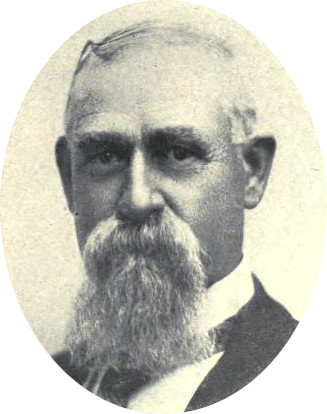
Joseph H. Frisby

Joseph H. Frisby was born in Birmingham, England in 1850, and was an English immigrant. He came to Utah in 1864, crossing the plains by ox team, and settled in Coalville, where he remained for several years until he went to Arizona. He settled in Provo in the year 1903, and had this house built soon after in 1905. Frisby lived at this location until 1913, when he sold this house and moved down the street to 258 North 400 West, where he died two years later.

Joseph H. Frisby lived a significant life, having served as a justice of the peace, having operated a mercantile business, and having been mayor of Provo for two years. Frisby's election was tangled up in controversy. During this time, the town of Provo was divided. Needing a railroad, the east side of town insisted that it be built on the east side of Provo, while the west insisted it belonged on the west side. Hoping to sway the decision, the west side of Provo nominated Joseph Frisby for mayor in hopes that he would act in their favor. Having won the election but narrowly, Joseph decided to postpone the decision until he was out of office.

Joseph Frisby sold his house to Charles Hopkins in 1913. Hopkins, born February 21, 1864, at Dorcetshire, England, immigrated to America in 1887 and settled in the town of Elkhorn, Montana. In Elkhorn Hopkins was primarily involved in mining and the mercantile business, as well as serving as the local postmaster for fifteen years. In 1912 Hopkins relocated to Provo, where he was elected to the Provo City Commission, where he served for thirteen years. Under his administration the City and County Building was built, the Provo Memorial Park was planned and most of Provo's streets were paved. Hopkins also served as the chairman of the Utah County WPA and FERA. He died November 9, 1936, in the Frisby House.

== The House today ==
The Frisby house is virtually unaltered and is well preserved, making it the best representative of this type of Victorian Eclectic house in Provo.
