= Milan and Margaret Packard House =

Historic house in Utah, United States

- U.S. National Register of Historic Places
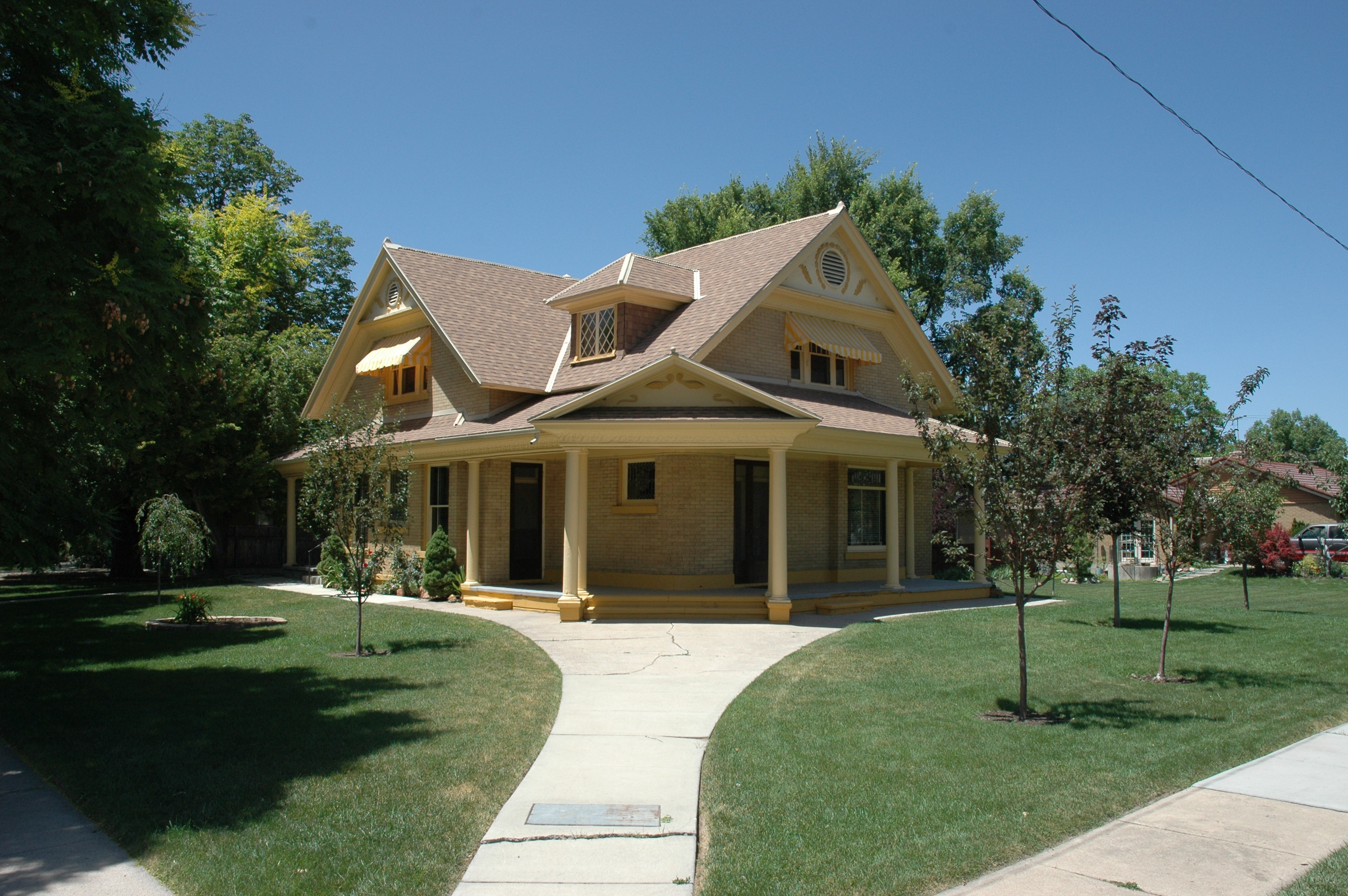

- Location within Utah Location within the United States
- Location: 110 W 100 S, Springville, Utah
- Coordinates: 40°9′56″N 111°36′43″W
- Area: 0.4 acres (0.16 ha)
- Built: 1908
- Architectural style: Classical Revival
- MPS: Springville MPS
- NRHP reference No.: 97001576
- Added to NRHP: January 5, 1998

The Milan and Margaret Packard House at 110 W 100 S in Springville, Utah was built in 1908. It was listed on the National Register of Historic Places in 1998.

It was built of fired brick.
