= Silver Row =

- U.S. National Register of Historic Places
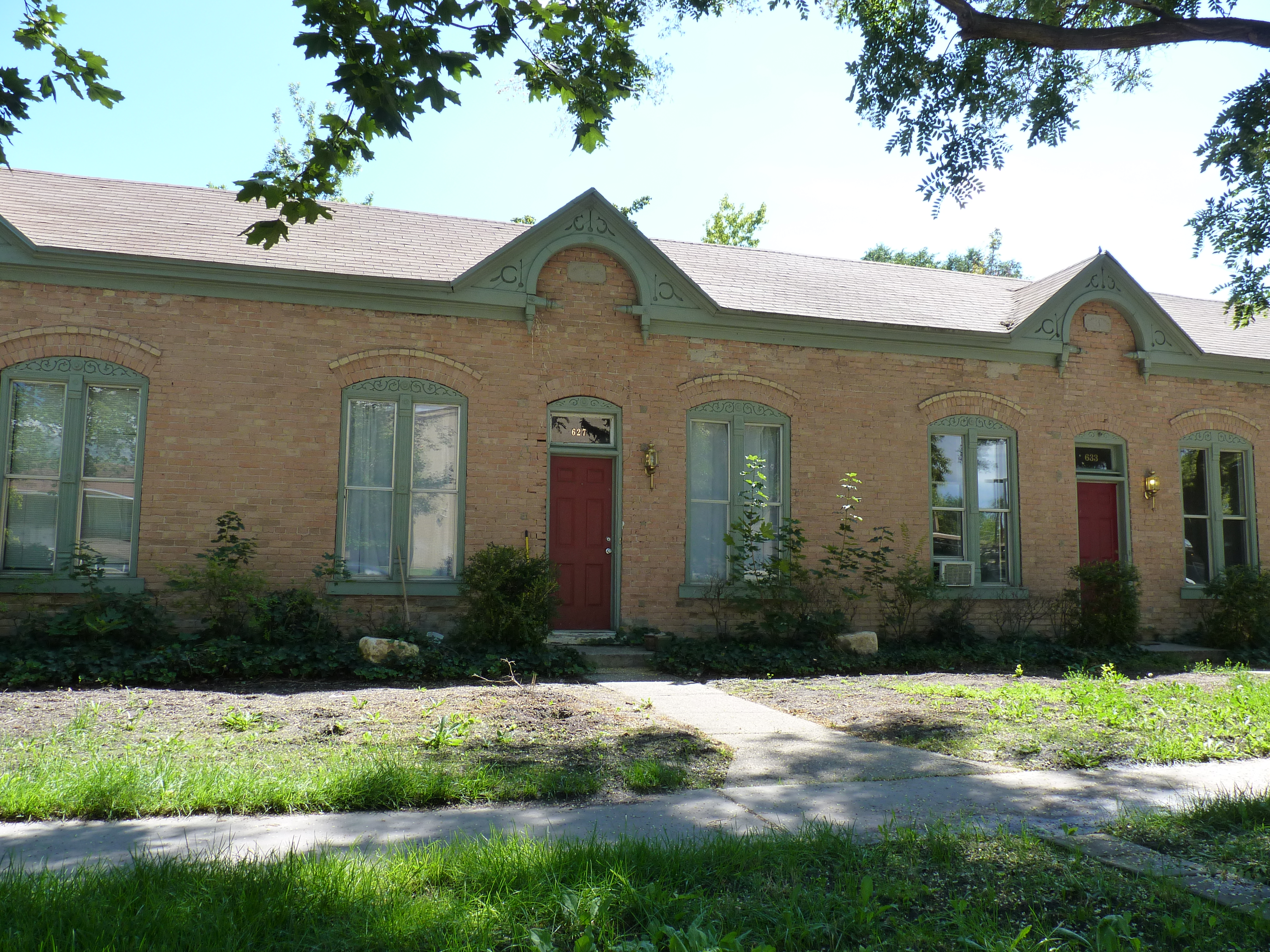
- Silver Row

- Location within Utah Location within the United States
- Location: 621-645 West 100 North; Provo, Utah
- Coordinates: 40°14′6″N 111°40′8″W
- Area: Less than 1 acre (0.40 ha)
- Built: 1890
- NRHP reference No.: 82004179
- Added to NRHP: August 4, 1982

Silver Row is a historic site located in Provo, Utah. It is listed on the National Register of Historic Places.

== Silver Row Apartments * 621-645 West 100 North * Provo, Utah ==
Built in 1890, the Silver Row Apartments were very representative of the times in the state of Utah. Row houses, such as these, were prevalent in the larger cities of Utah and represent much of the lower-income residential architecture of the time period. Few of these examples remain today, making these apartments a valuable and significant asset to the state of Utah's history. The Silver Row Apartments were designated to the Provo City Historic Landmarks Registry on April 26, 1996.

=== Structure ===
“Stylistically, the Row combines Greek Revival and Eastlake motifs into an overall symmetrical framework (Carter p. 1).” Silver Row Apartments consist of five single story brick apartment units set out in a line. The apartments share a gabled roof and common walls. The entire structure measures about 120 feet in length. The central door has a window on either side. The long windows are topped by relieving arches with decorative infill, similar to the decor over the doors. Decorative wood, arches, pendents, and other Victorian detailing distinguish this apartment's historical significance from others.

=== History ===
The original owner of Silver Row was David P. Felt. Felt was born in Salt Lake City in 1860. After marrying Nora Civish, Felt relocated to Provo, Utah. Silver Row was built by him about 1890, but after three years Felt sold the apartments to Samuel S. Jones and Henry J. Maiben. Maiben stayed in one of the units with his family until he died, and his family stayed until the early 1920s. Samuel Jones sold his in interest in the property in 1902. In 1920 Joseph Nelson, an architect, bought the apartments and sold them six years later to George P. Parker, a wealthy judge residing in Provo. Parker retained the property until 1958, when Silver Row was purchased by Thomas O. And Judity W. Parker. B. Park Brockbank attained the apartments in 1973, after which Robert L. Gunther did in 1976. The title passed to Bob and Pop Investments, Inc. In 1977, after which it passed to John A. Riding in 1978.
