= Lehi North Branch Meetinghouse =

Historic church in Utah, United States

- U.S. National Register of Historic Places
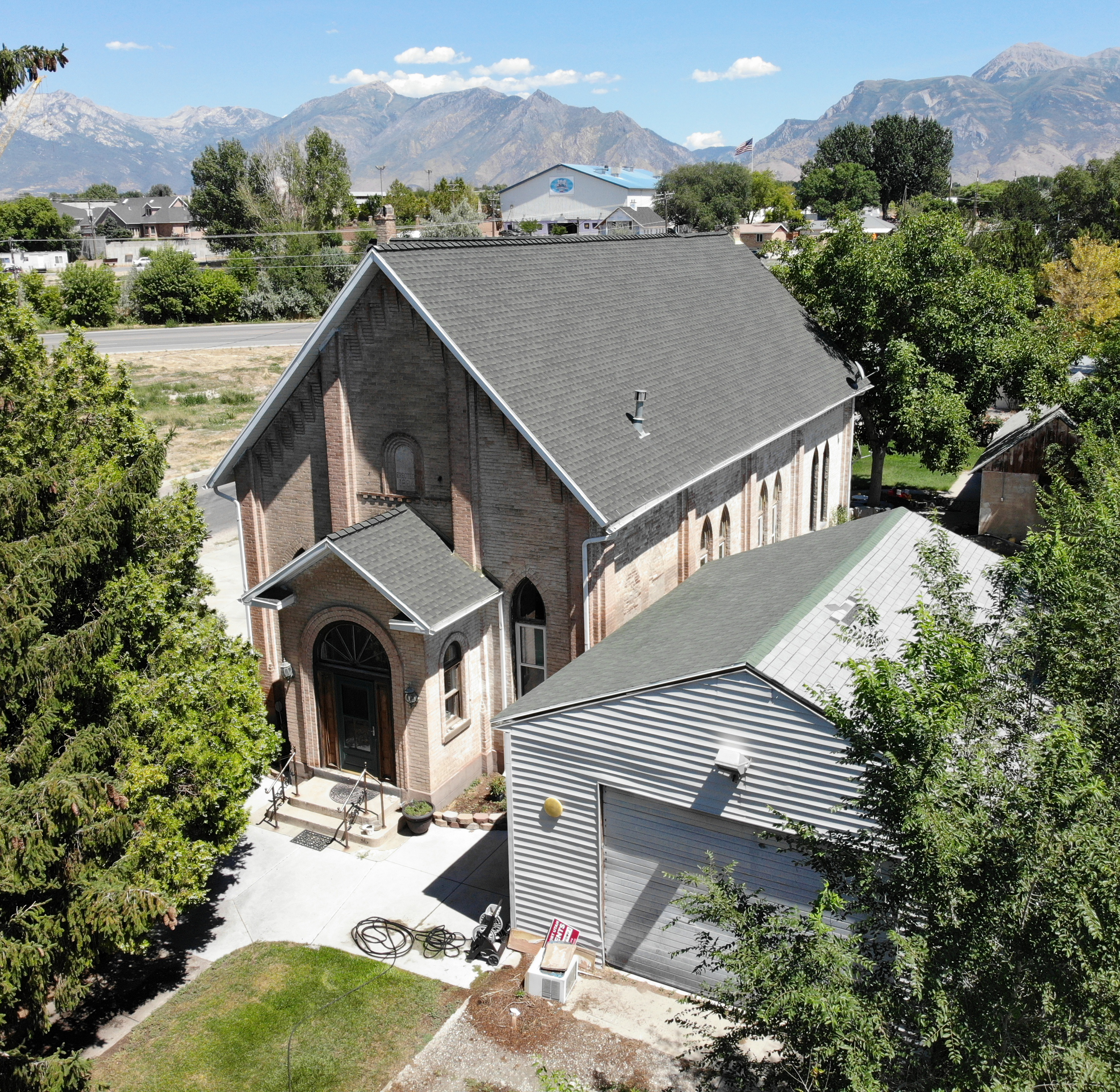

- Location within Utah Location within the United States
- Location: 1190 North 500 West, Lehi, Utah
- Coordinates: 40°23′34″N 111°51′19″W
- Area: 0.5 acres (0.20 ha)
- Built: 1894, 1917
- Built by: Ohran, Charles; Field, Andrew
- Architectural style: Gothic Revival, Classical Revival
- MPS: Lehi, Utah MPS
- NRHP reference No.: 98001455
- Added to NRHP: December 4, 1998

The Lehi North Branch Meetinghouse, located at 1190 North 500 West in Lehi, Utah, was built in 1894 and expanded in 1917. The building features Gothic Revival and Classical Revival architecture. It has also been known as the Lehi Third Ward Meetinghouse and Zion's Hill Meetinghouse.
