= Roy H. and Florence B. Gappmayer House =

Historic house in Utah, United States

- U.S. National Register of Historic Places
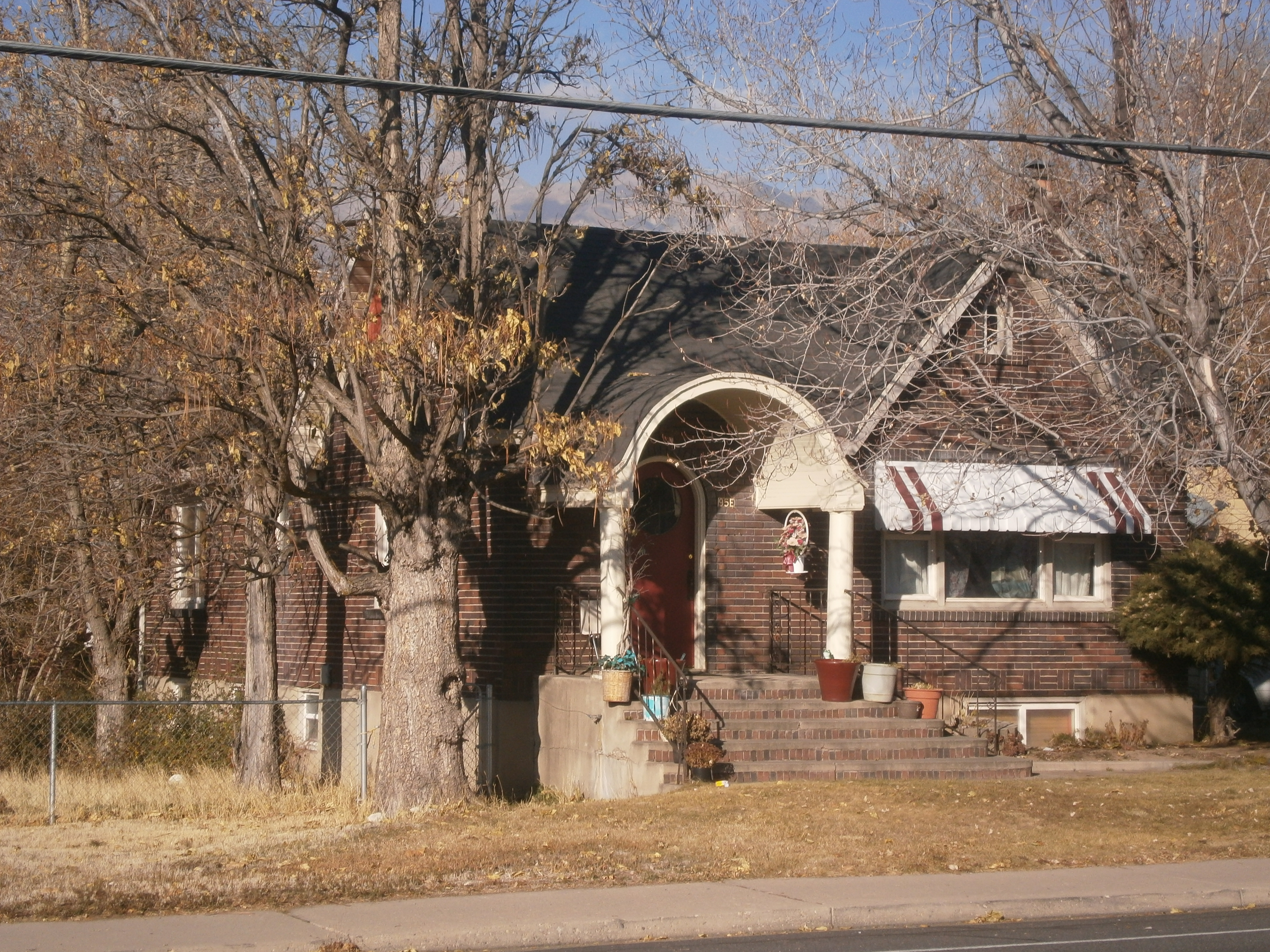

- Location within Utah Location within the United States
- Location: 95 E. 1200 S., Orem, Utah
- Coordinates: 40°16′31″N 111°41′32″W
- Area: 0.4 acres (0.16 ha)
- Built: 1935
- Built by: Gappmayer, Roy H.
- Architectural style: Tudor Revival
- MPS: Orem, Utah MPS
- NRHP reference No.: 98000672
- Added to NRHP: June 11, 1998

The Roy H. and Florence B. Gappmayer House at 95 E. 1200 S. in Orem, Utah was built in 1935. It was listed on the National Register of Historic Places in 1998.

It is a south-facing brick, Tudor Revival-style house, built on a two-foot high concrete foundation, over a full basement. The first two courses of brick above the foundation are laid in a "basket-weave pattern". It has a tapered brick chimney on its east facade.

The front entry, on the left of the front facade, has an arched door and an arched, covered porch with belcast eaves, supported by Doric columns. The porch's ceiling and soffits were built of bead board, which the owner in 1998 planned to cover with aluminum siding. The porch ends at a circular concrete stairway which radiates out.

According to its NRHP nomination, the house "is a good representation of the kinds commonly built in Orem during this time period and reflects the history of the Gappmayers who lived here during the community's growth as a city."
