= McBride-Sims Garage =

- U.S. National Register of Historic Places
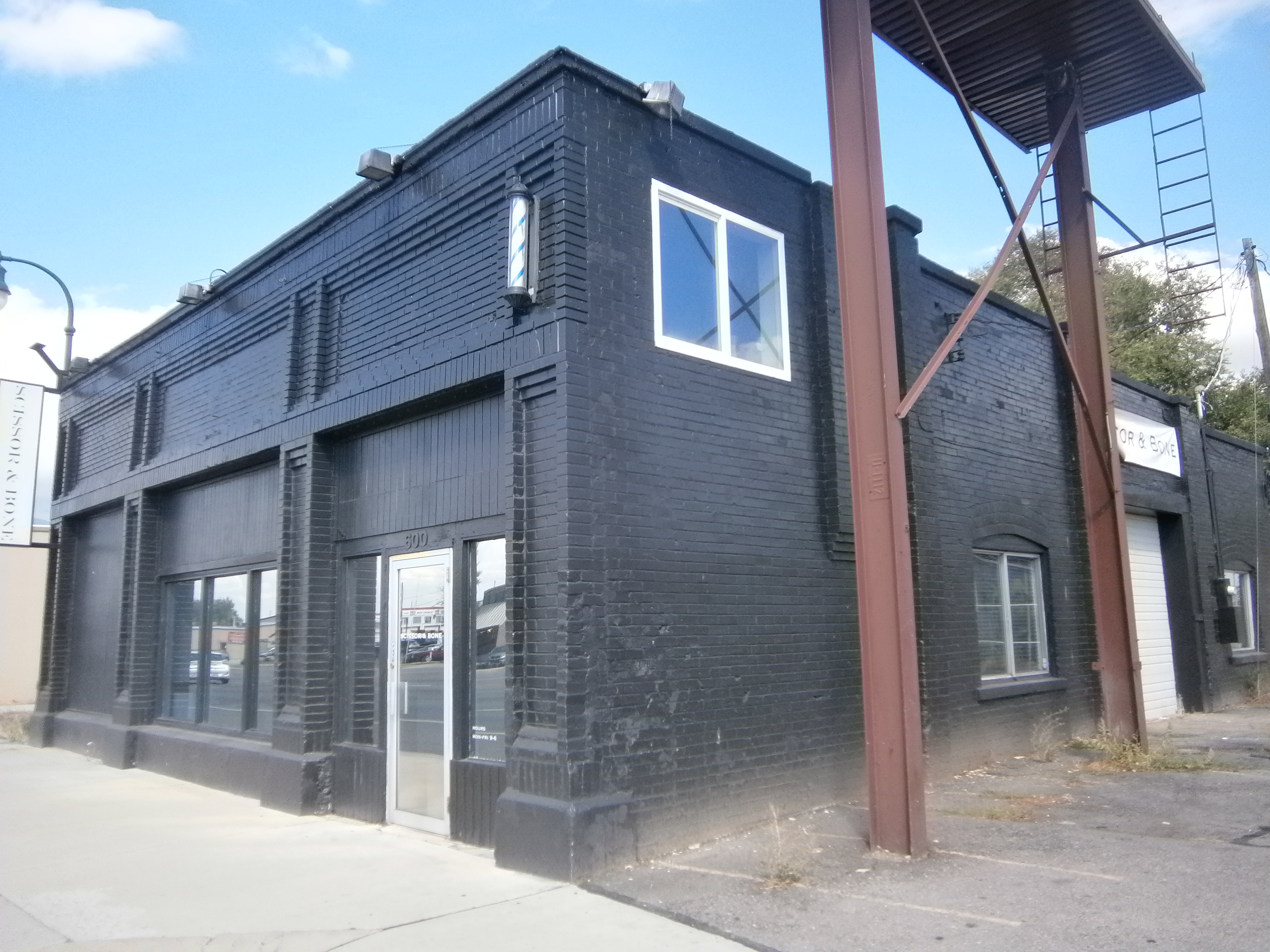

- Location within Utah Location within the United States
- Location: 600 N. State St., Orem, Utah
- Coordinates: 40°18′30″N 111°41′56″W
- Area: 0.6 acres (0.24 ha)
- Built: 1920
- Architectural style: Early Commercial
- MPS: Orem, Utah MPS
- NRHP reference No.: 98000664
- Added to NRHP: June 11, 1998

The McBride-Sims Garage at 600 N. State St. in Orem, Utah is a brick building built in c.1920, in what is termed Early Commercial architecture. It has also been known as Big John's Country Store. It was listed on the National Register of Historic Places in 1998.
