= Ashton–Driggs House =

Historic house in Utah, United States

- U.S. National Register of Historic Places
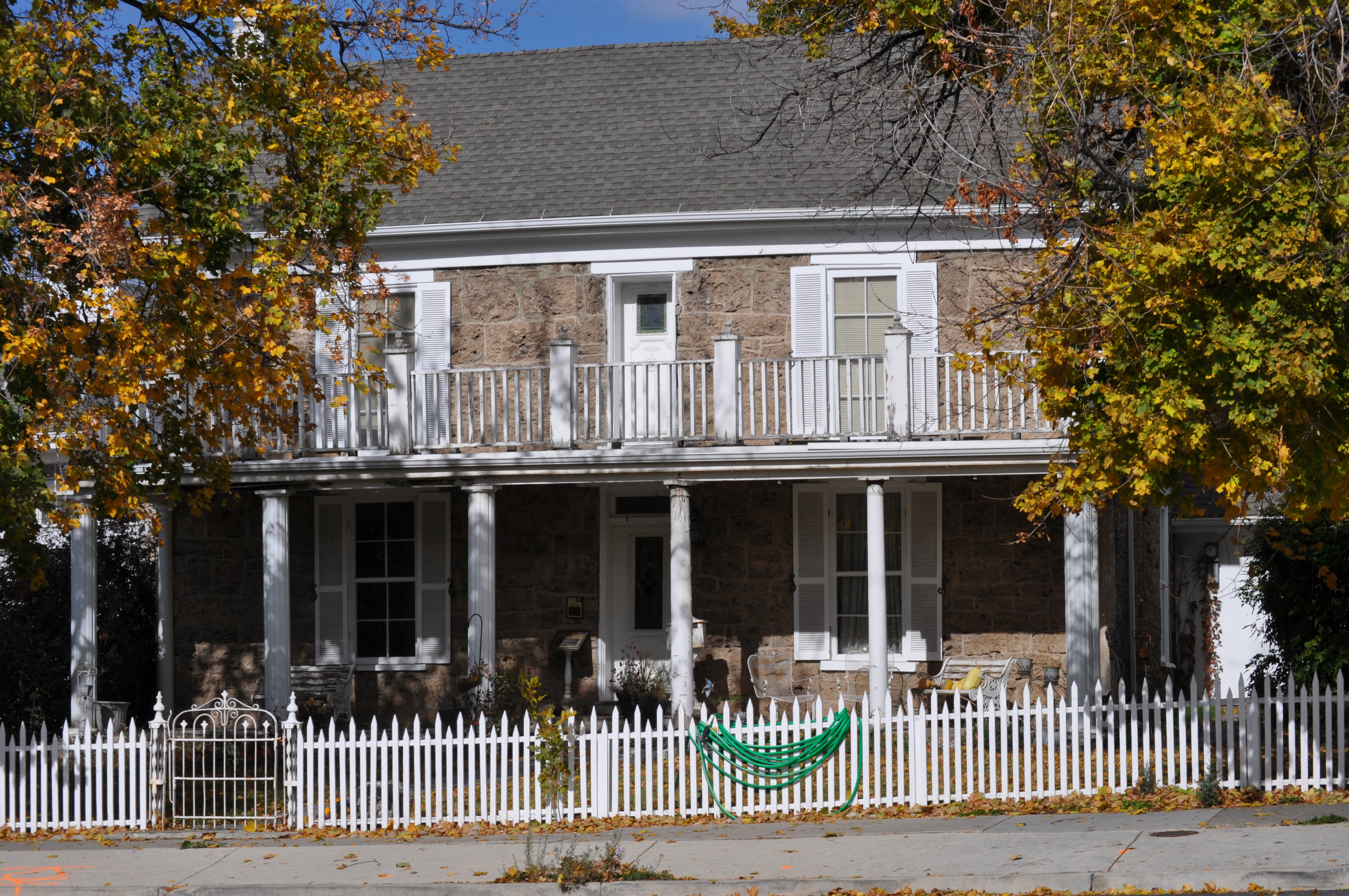

- Location within Utah Location within the United States
- Location: 119 E. Battlecreek Rd., Pleasant Grove, Utah
- Coordinates: 40°21′42″N 111°44′13″W
- Area: less than one acre
- Built: 1865
- Built by: Ashton, William
- Architectural style: Greek Revival
- MPS: Pleasant Grove Soft-Rock Buildings TR (AD)
- NRHP reference No.: 72001261
- Added to NRHP: April 14, 1972

The Ashton–Driggs House on E. Battlecreek Rd. in Pleasant Grove, Utah, United States, was built in 1865. Also known as the Benjamin W. Driggs House, it includes Greek Revival architecture. It was listed on the National Register of Historic Places in 1972.

It is a stone house built of soft, tufa rock. It was added to several times since its original construction.
