= Yard–Groesbeck House =

Historic house in Utah, United States

- U.S. National Register of Historic Places
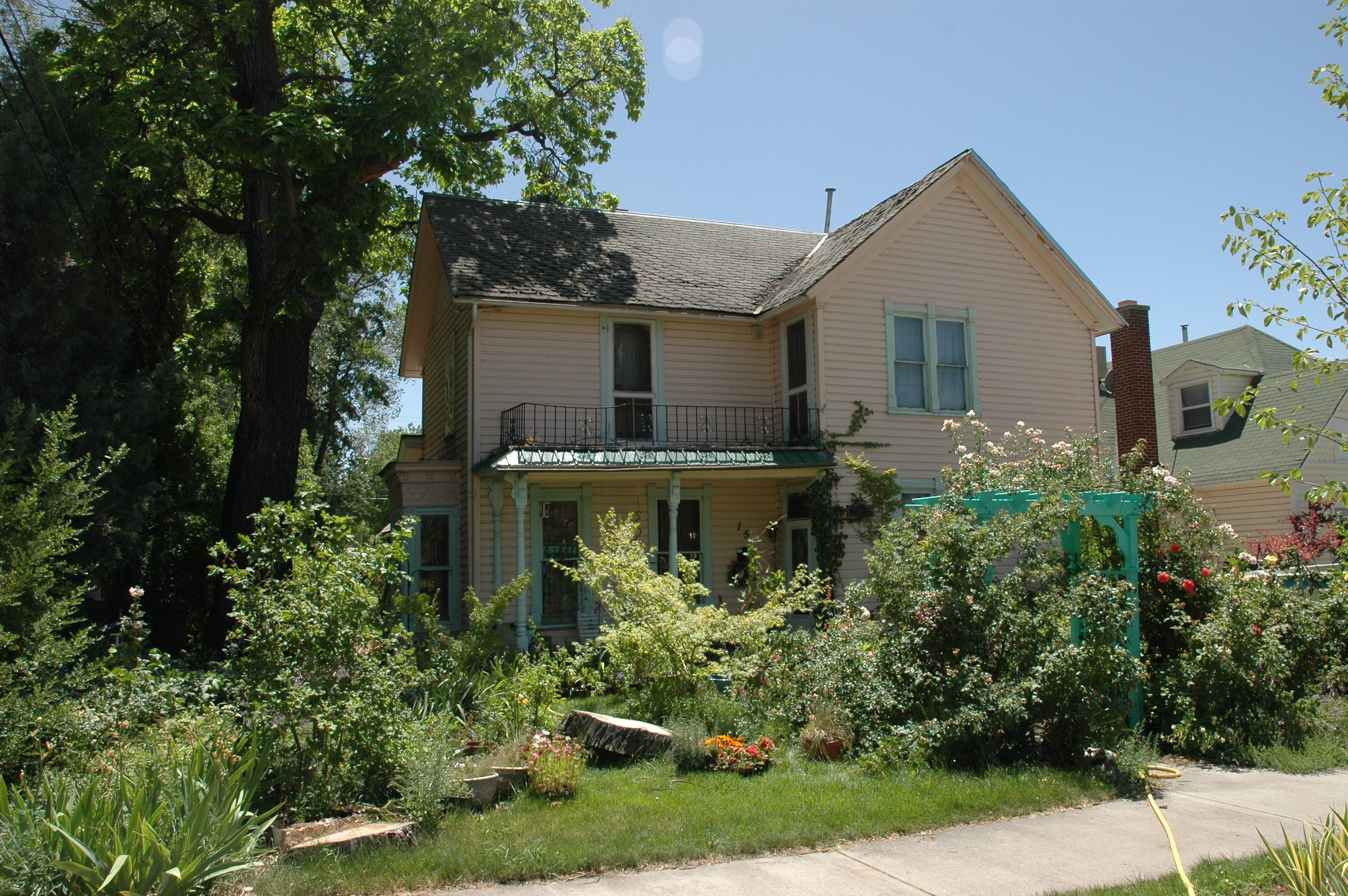

- Location within Utah Location within the United States
- Location: 157 W 200 S, Springville, Utah
- Coordinates: 40°9′51″N 111°36′44″W
- Area: 0.2 acres (0.081 ha)
- Built: 1891
- Architectural style: Late Victorian
- MPS: Springville MPS
- NRHP reference No.: 97001581
- Added to NRHP: January 5, 1998

The Yard–Groesbeck House at 157 W 200 S in Springville, Utah was built in 1891. It was listed on the National Register of Historic Places in 1998.

It was built originally as a one-story "Victorian T-cottage" but was soon expanded to a two-story house.
