= Beers House–Hotel =

Historic house in Utah, United States

- U.S. National Register of Historic Places
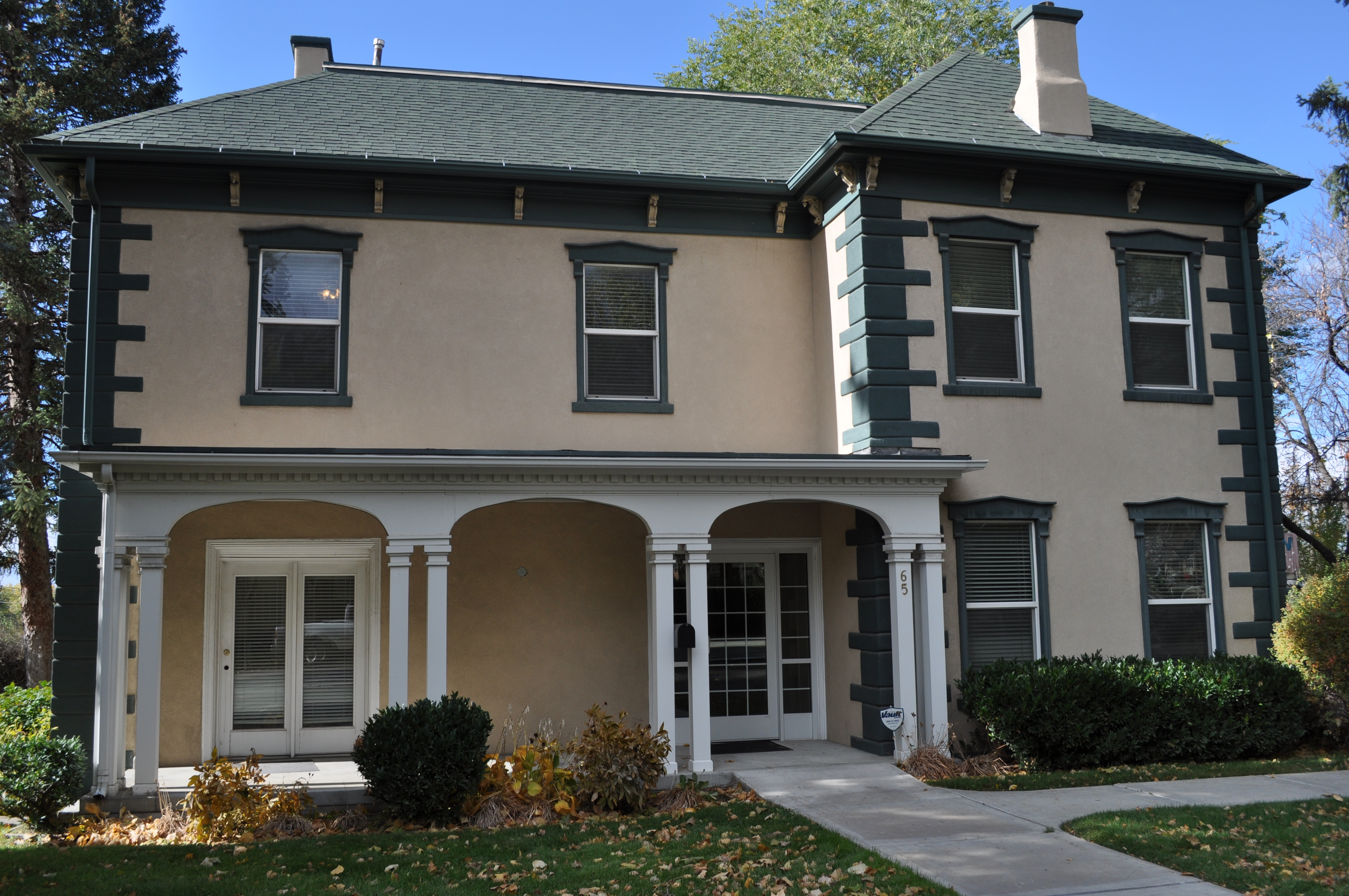

- Location within Utah Location within the United States
- Location: 65 N. 100 East, Pleasant Grove, Utah
- Coordinates: 40°21′54″N 111°44′16″W
- Area: less than one acre
- Built: 1885
- Built by: Thomas Weatherstone; E.J. Ward
- Architect: Fred Markham
- Architectural style: Italianate
- NRHP reference No.: 94000296
- Added to NRHP: April 7, 1994

The Beers House–Hotel on N. 100 East in Pleasant Grove, Utah is listed on the National Register of Historic Places (NRHP). It was built in Italianate style of large, adobe bricks in 1885 and was renovated in 1930 with addition of stucco and quoins. In 1885 it was a work of mason Thomas Featherstone of Lehi with interior and exterior woodwork by E.J. Ward of Pleasant Grove and his two sons. Renovations in 1930 were done under supervision of Provo, Utah architect Fred Markham (who also is associated with the NRHP-listed Provo Third Ward Chapel and Amusement Hall, in Provo). It was renovated again in 1993. It was listed on the NRHP in 1994.

Currently, the Beers House–Hotel is home to GoCertify, an IT Certification news and reseller company.
