= Peteetneet Museum and Cultural Arts Center =

- Peteetneet School
- U.S. National Register of Historic Places
- U.S. Historic district
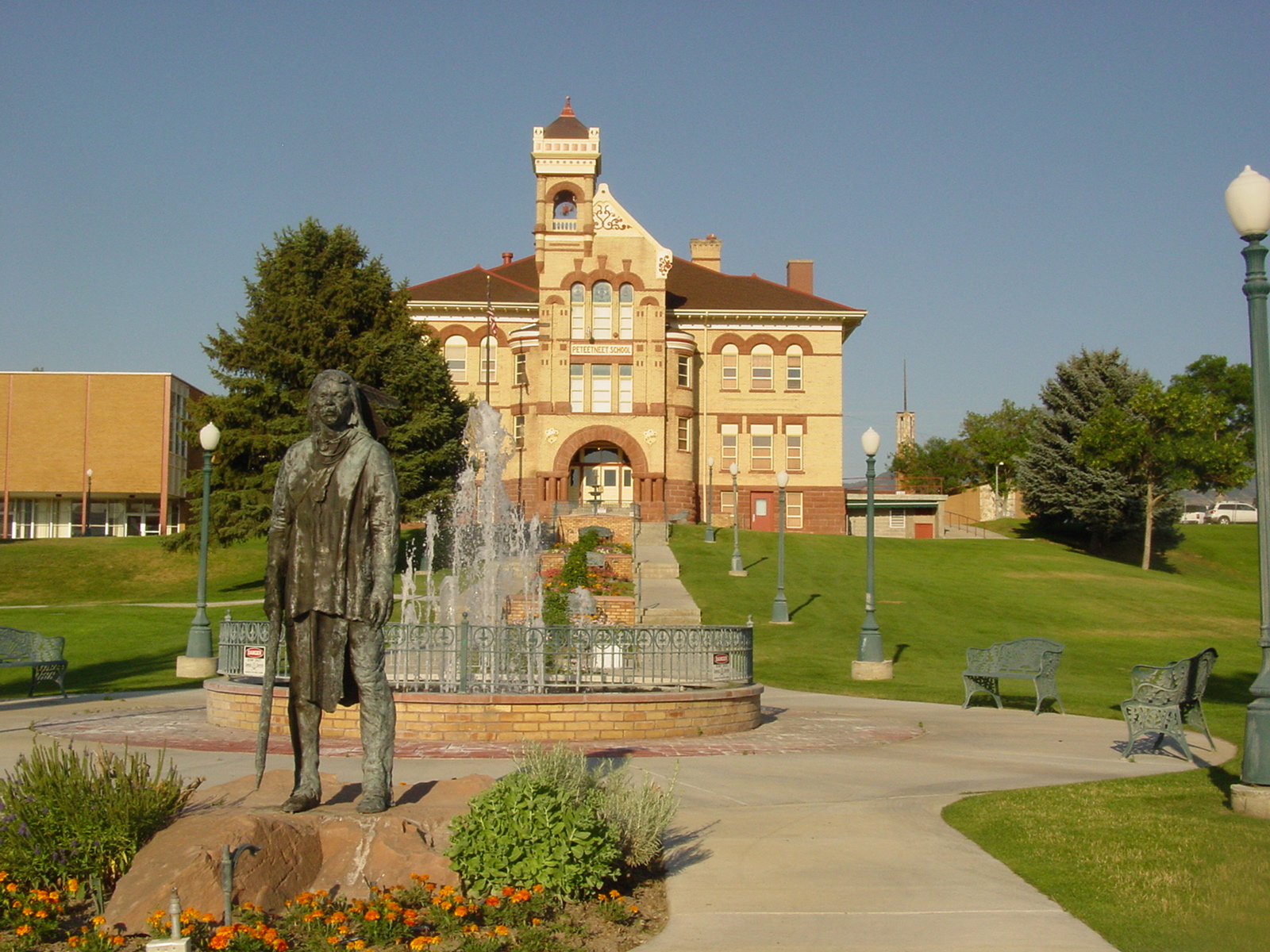

- Location within Utah Location within the United States
- Location: 50 N. 500 E. Payson, Utah
- Coordinates: 40°02′36″N 111°43′24″W
- Architect: Richard C. Watkins
- Architectural style: Victorian Romanesque
- NRHP reference No.: 90000795
- Added to NRHP: April 02, 1990

The Peteetneet Museum and Cultural Arts Center is a multi-purpose civic building located in Payson, Utah, United States.

== Description ==
The facility is named after Chief Peteetneet, the indigenous clan leader of a Tumpanawach (Timpanogos) Ute band, and a monument of him stands at the front of Center. The building houses a Daughters of the Utah Pioneers museum of pioneer artifacts, the Payson Historical Society, and the Peteetneet Arts Council as well as many community art and dance classes and events. The large hill behind the building is a popular place for watersliding in the summer and sledding in the winter.

== History ==
Prior to serving as a museum and cultural arts center, the Peteetneet School or Peteetneet Academy was erected in 1901. The architectural design combines both Victorian and Romanesque Revival architecture and was done by Richard C. Watkins, who designed many other schools through Utah and Sanpete counties. The Victorian belfry makes this school more flamboyant than other prominent schools designed by Watkins such as the Maeser School or Old Spring City School. The building served as an academy and then elementary school until 1989 when Payson City planned to demolish the building. A group of concerned citizens formed People Preserving Peteetneet and were instrumental in saving and restoring the school. Since the building is located on the Nebo Loop Scenic Byway, the Utah Department of Transportation awarded over $100,000 to assist in the restoration. The building was transformed into a museum and civic center. A glass elevator was added in 2008. The building has been listed on the National Register of Historic Places since May 30, 1990.

== See also ==
- National Register of Historic Places listings in Utah County, Utah
