= Seely House =

Seely House or Seelye House may refer to:

in the United Kingdom

- Houses of the Seely Baronets, including Sherwood Lodge in Arnold in the County of Nottingham and Brooke House in Brooke on the Isle of Wight

in the United States

- Seth Seelye House, Bethel, Connecticut, listed on the NRHP in Fairfield County, Connecticut
- A. B. Seelye House, Abilene, Kansas, listed on the NRHP in Dickinson County, Kansas
- Seely/Wright House, Oyster Bay, New York, a local historical landmark known also as Seely House
- Dr. John W. Seely House, Howland Corners, Ohio, listed on the NRHP in Trumbull County, Ohio
- John H. Seely House, Mount Pleasant, Utah, listed on the NRHP in Sanpete County, Utah
