= Spring City School =

- U.S. National Register of Historic Places
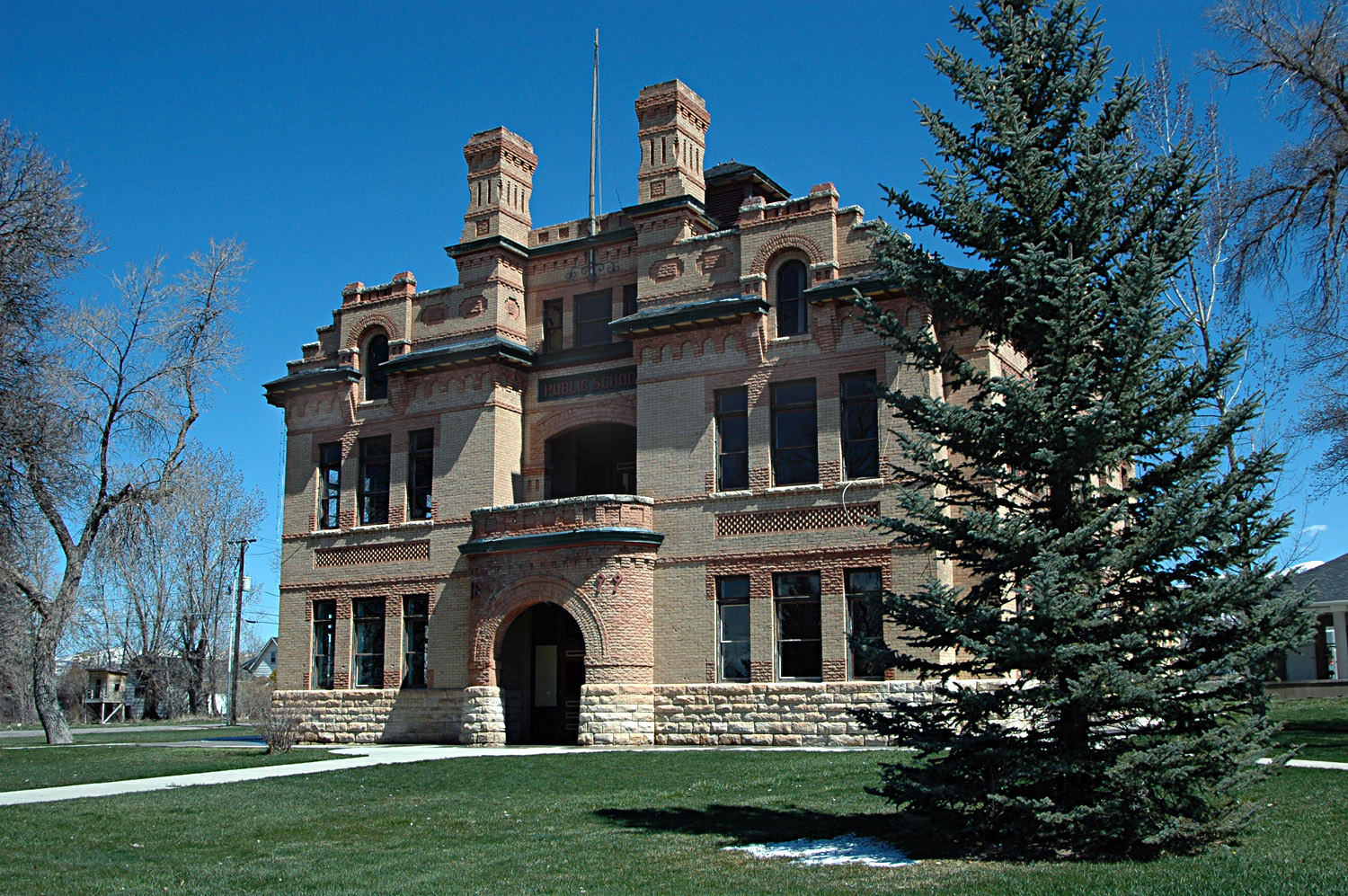

- Location within Utah Location within the United States
- Location: 45 S. 100 East, Spring City, Utah
- Coordinates: 39°28′40″N 111°29′35″W
- Area: less than one acre
- Built: 1899
- Architect: Richard C. Watkins
- NRHP reference No.: 78002691
- Added to NRHP: November 14, 1978

The Spring City School, at 45 S. 100 East, off Utah State Route 117, in Spring City, Utah, was built in 1899. It was listed on the National Register of Historic Places in 1978.

It was designed by architect Richard C. Watkins. It is a two-and-a-half-story brick building.

In 1978 it was one of only three public buildings in Spring City, with the others being the city's small City Hall (built as a school in 1893 and converted to city offices in 1900) and the Spring City Tabernacle (also designed by Richard C. Watkins).
