= Harrington Elementary School =

- U.S. National Register of Historic Places
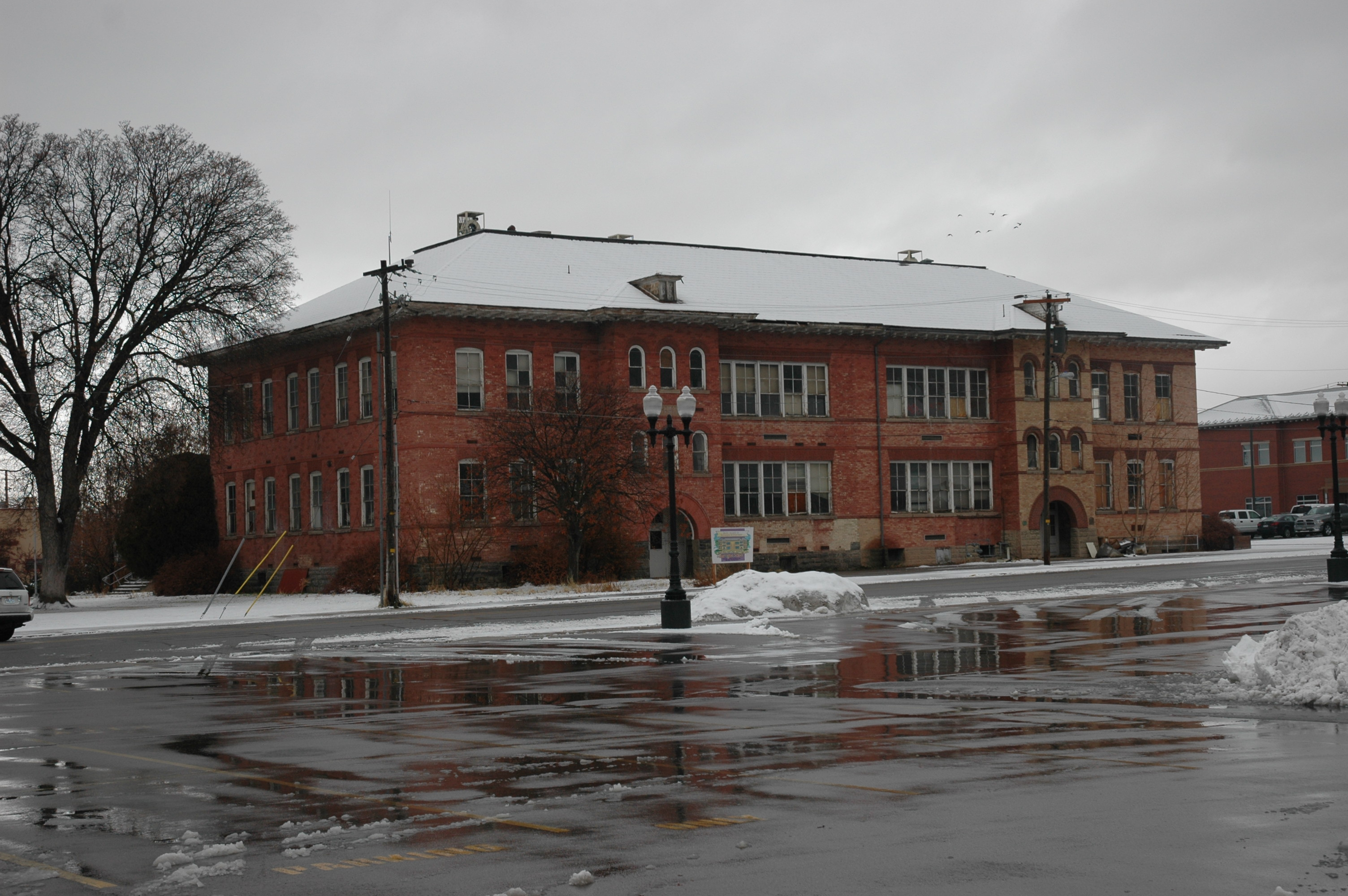
- Harrington Elementary School, December 2010

- Location within Utah Location within the United States
- Location: 50 North Center Street; American Fork, Utah; United States
- Coordinates: 40°22′41″N 111°47′52″W
- Area: 1.6 acres (0.65 ha)
- Built: 1903, 1934
- Architect: Watkins, Richard C.; Nelson, Joseph
- Architectural style: Romanesque
- NRHP reference No.: 93000064
- Added to NRHP: March 4, 1993

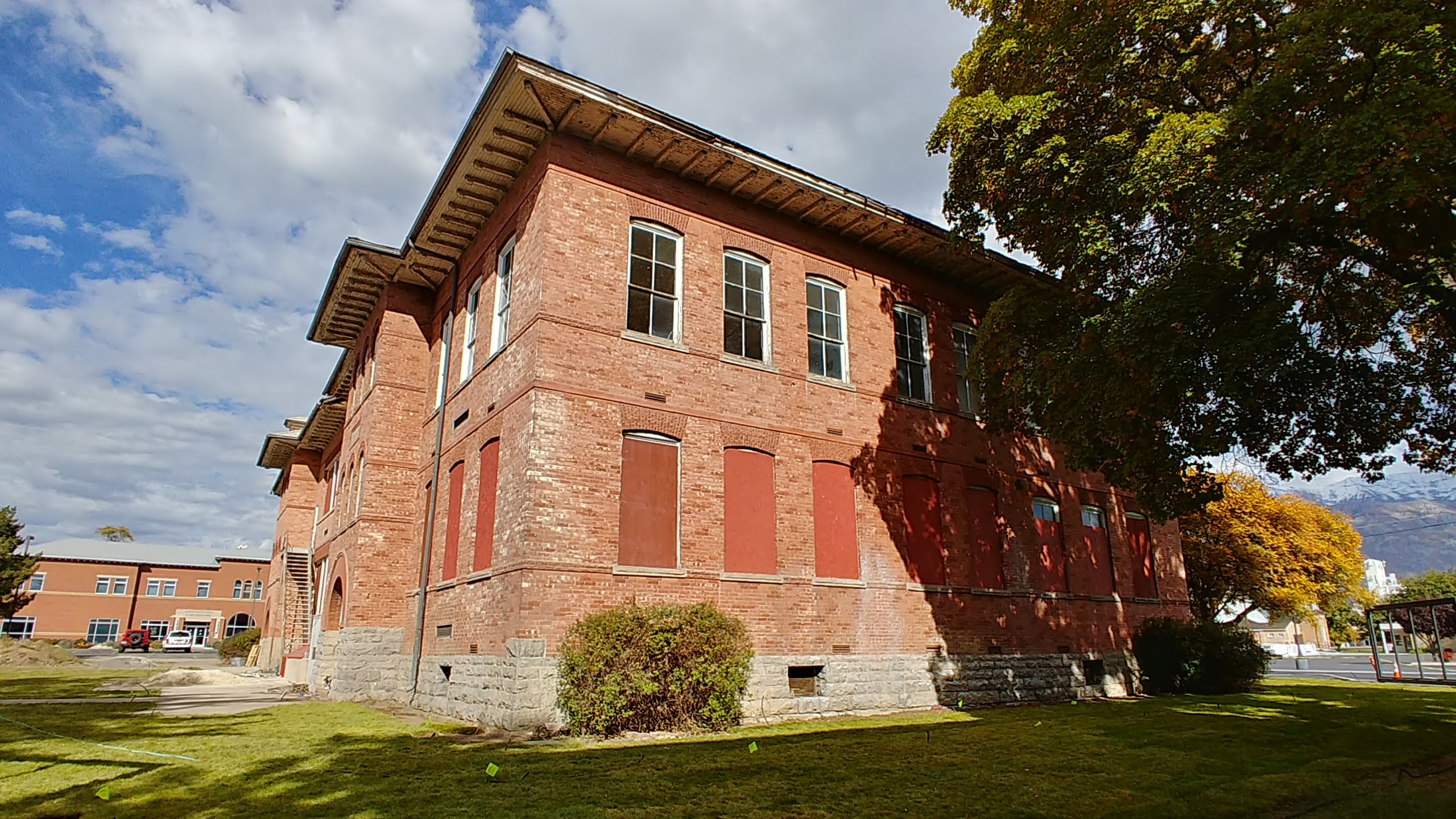
West side of the old Harrington Elementary School in American Fork

The Harrington Elementary School is a former school in central American Fork, Utah, United States, that is listed on the National Register of Historic Places.

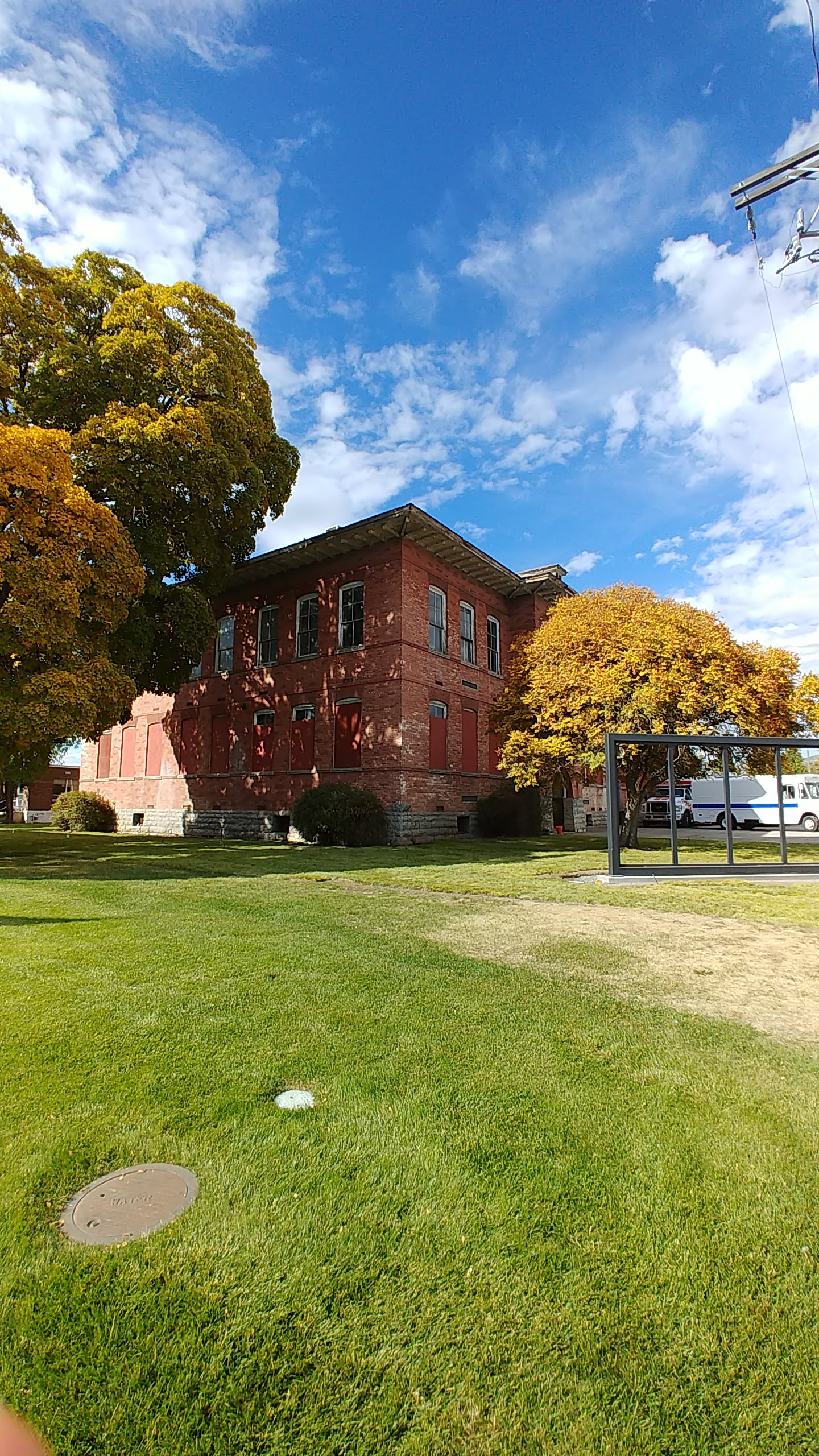
North- West side

== Description ==
Located at 50 North Center Street, it was built in two equal stages, in 1903 and 1934. The 1903 original school design was probably a work of Richard C. Watkins; the 1934 expansion was designed by a Joseph Nelson. The 1934 addition has been asserted to be "a noteworthy example of sympathetic expansion architecture."

It was listed on the National Register of Historic Places in 1993.

== See also ==
- National Register of Historic Places listings in Utah County, Utah
