= Fred L. Markham =

American architect (1902–1984)

Fred Lewis Markham (July 3, 1902 – September 28, 1984) was an American architect in the early 20th century who designed movie theatres and many buildings on the campus of Brigham Young University (BYU) in Provo, Utah.

== Biography ==
Markham was born in Spanish Fork, Utah. His family moved to Provo in 1911 and in that year he began to study at the Brigham Young University Training School. He graduated from Brigham Young High School in 1919 and from BYU in 1923. He majored in math with a minor in chemistry. From 1924 to 1926 he served as a missionary for the Church of Jesus Christ of Latter-day Saints (LDS Church) in the Eastern States Mission.

Markham then went on to study at the Massachusetts Institute of Technology where he received a degree in architecture.

== Architectural career ==
Markham designed many school buildings of a variety of functions including many buildings on the BYU campus. These include the LaVell Edwards Stadium, Carillon Bell Tower, Smith Fieldhouse, Eyring Science Center, Joseph Smith Building, Knight Magnum Building, Herald R. Clark Building, David O. McKay Building, Wilkinson Student Center, John A. Widtsoe Building, and the James E. Talmage Math and Computer Building. Many of these are built with beige brick which has become a trademark of the many buildings built while Markham was active as an architect. Several of these were in collaboration with other architects. Markham also designed the Student Union Buildings at Snow College, Utah State University and the University of Utah. He also designed Provo High School.

Many theaters were designed by Markham including the SCERA Center for the Arts in Orem, Utah, the Arch Theatre in Spanish Fork, Utah and the Huish Theatres in Riverton, Utah and Payson, Utah.

Religious buildings include the Ogden Stake Tabernacle, (the last tabernacle commissioned by the LDS Church), and the Salt Lake Monument Park Ward Chapel.

Two works by Markham are listed on the National Register of Historic Places:

- Provo Third Ward Chapel and Amusement Hall, in Provo, Utah. Built 1901 and redesigned by Markham in the 1930s.
- Beers House-Hotel in Pleasant Grove, Utah. Built in 1885 with 1930 renovations designed by Markham.

== Personal life ==
Markham also served as the first president of the Utah Heritage Foundation.

In the 1960s and 1970s, Markham served for thirteen years as president of the Utah Stake, later called the Provo Utah Central Stake.

== Images of works ==
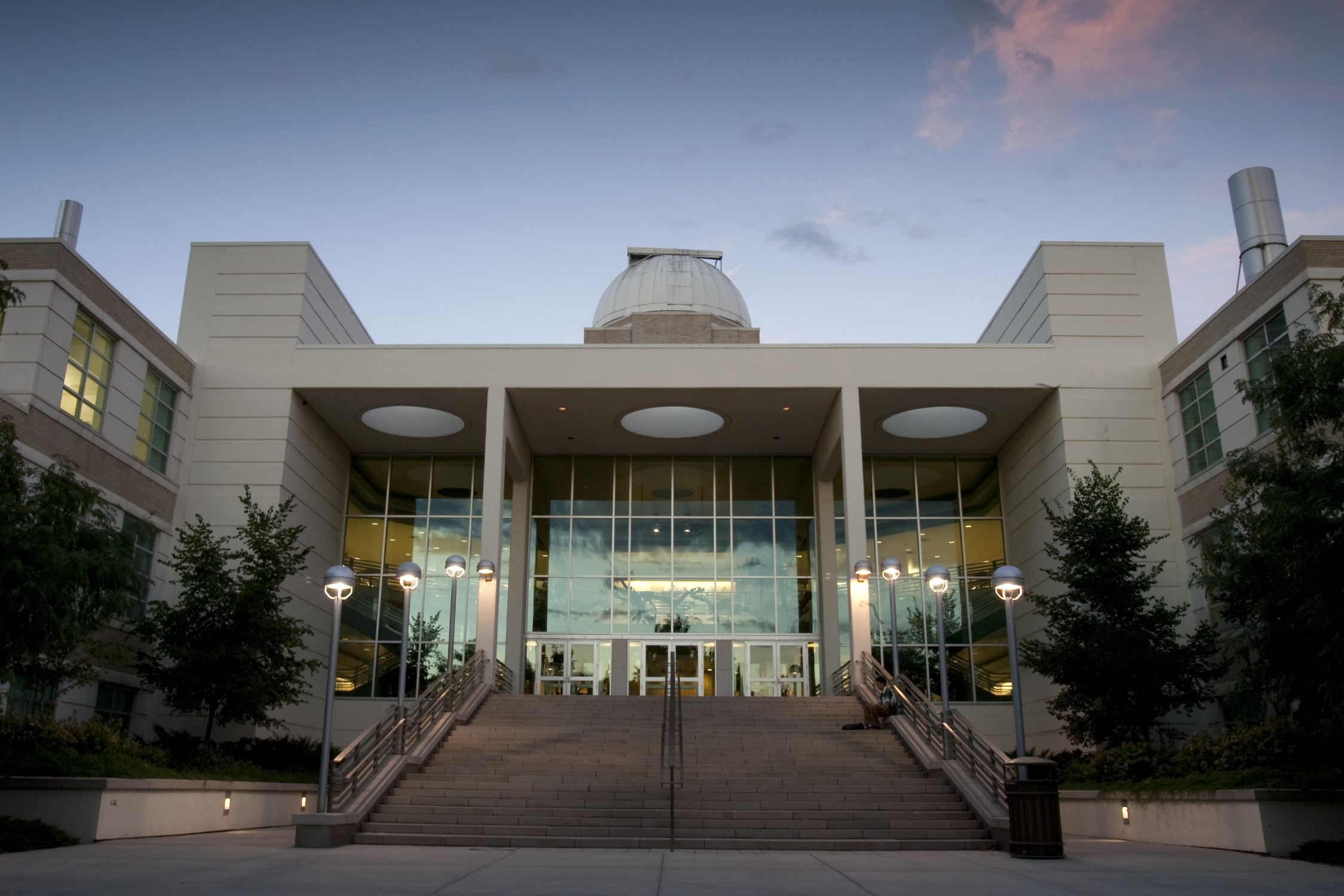
Eyring Science Center

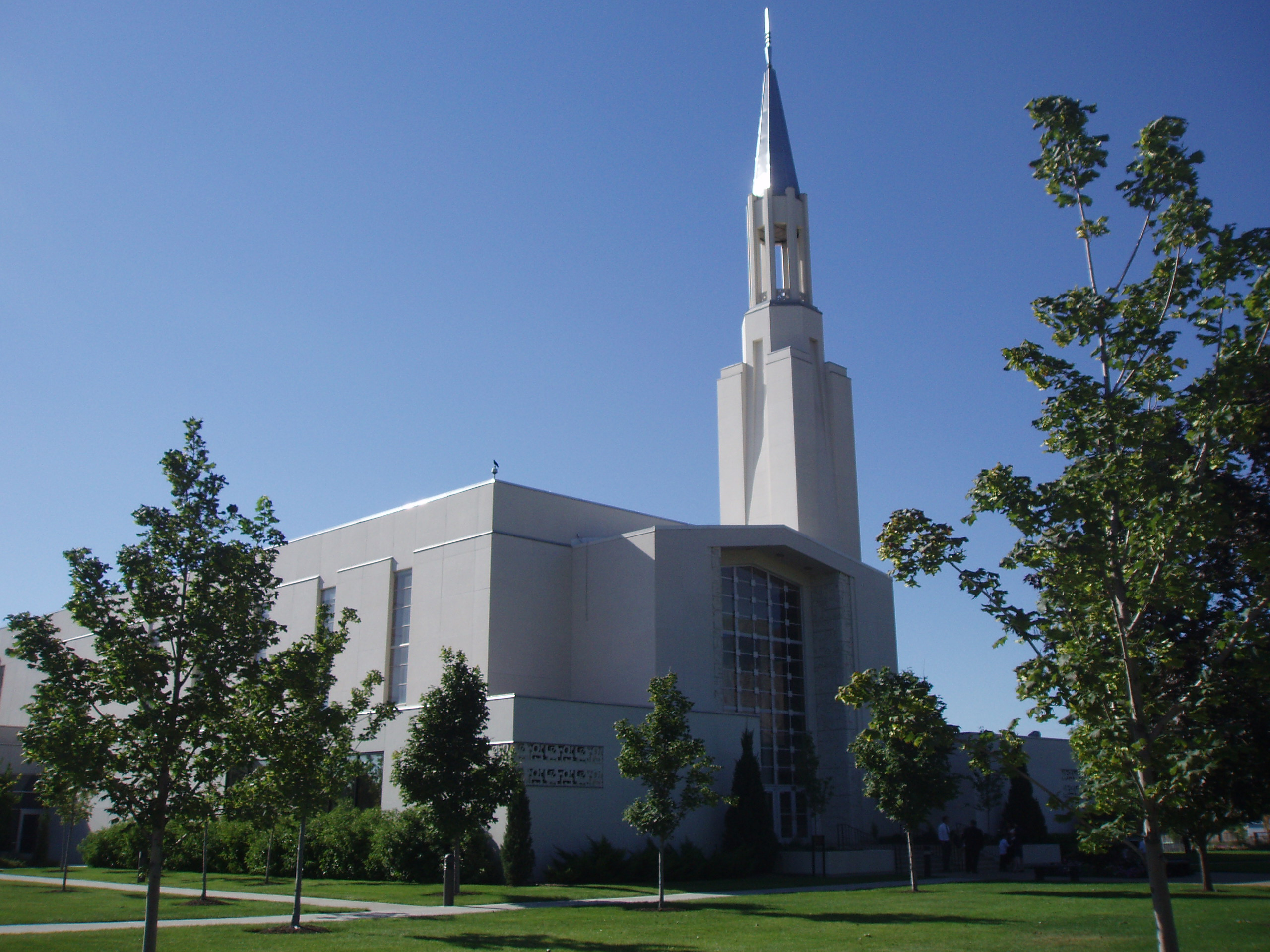
Ogden Stake Tabernacle

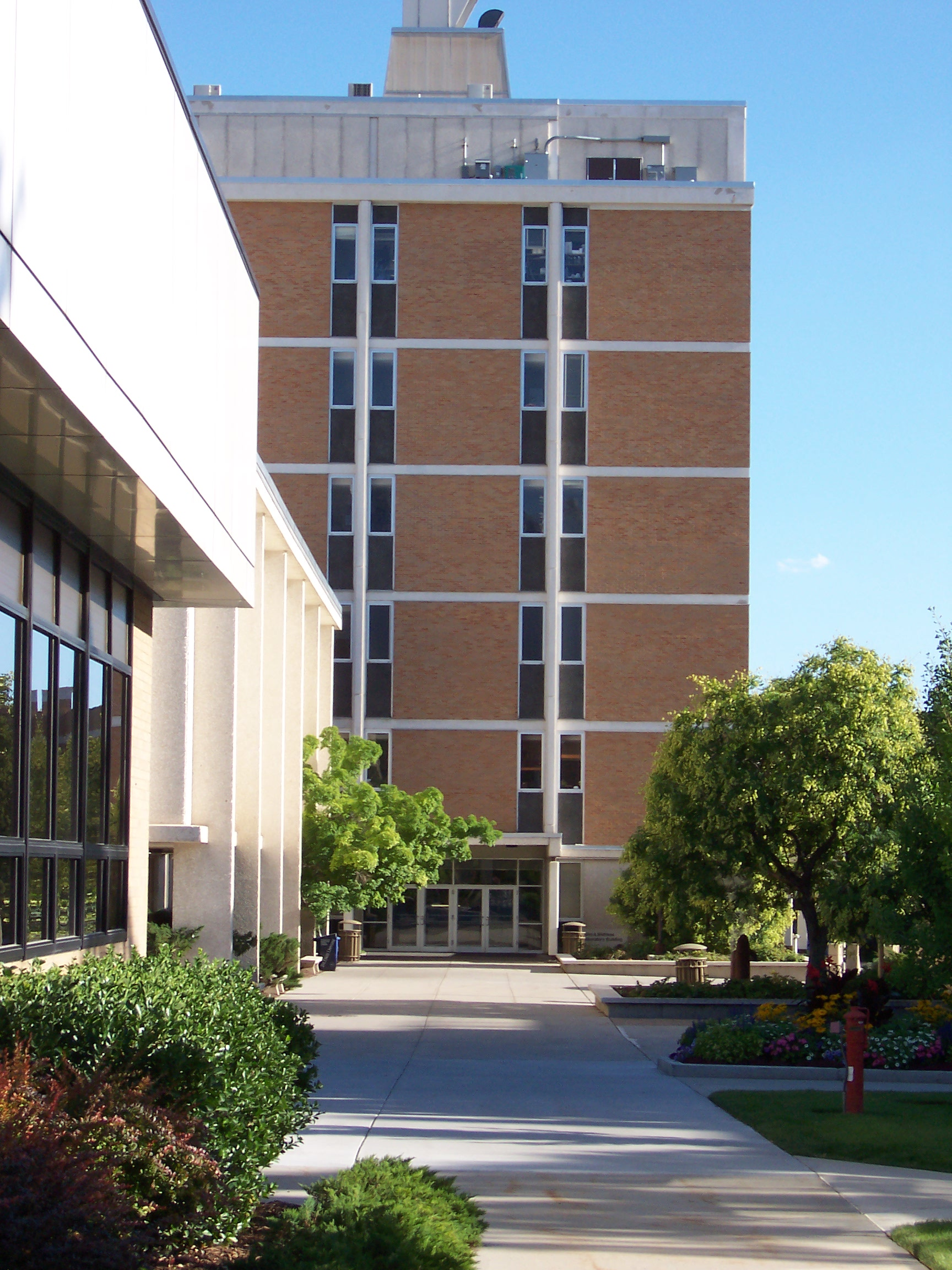
Widstoe Building

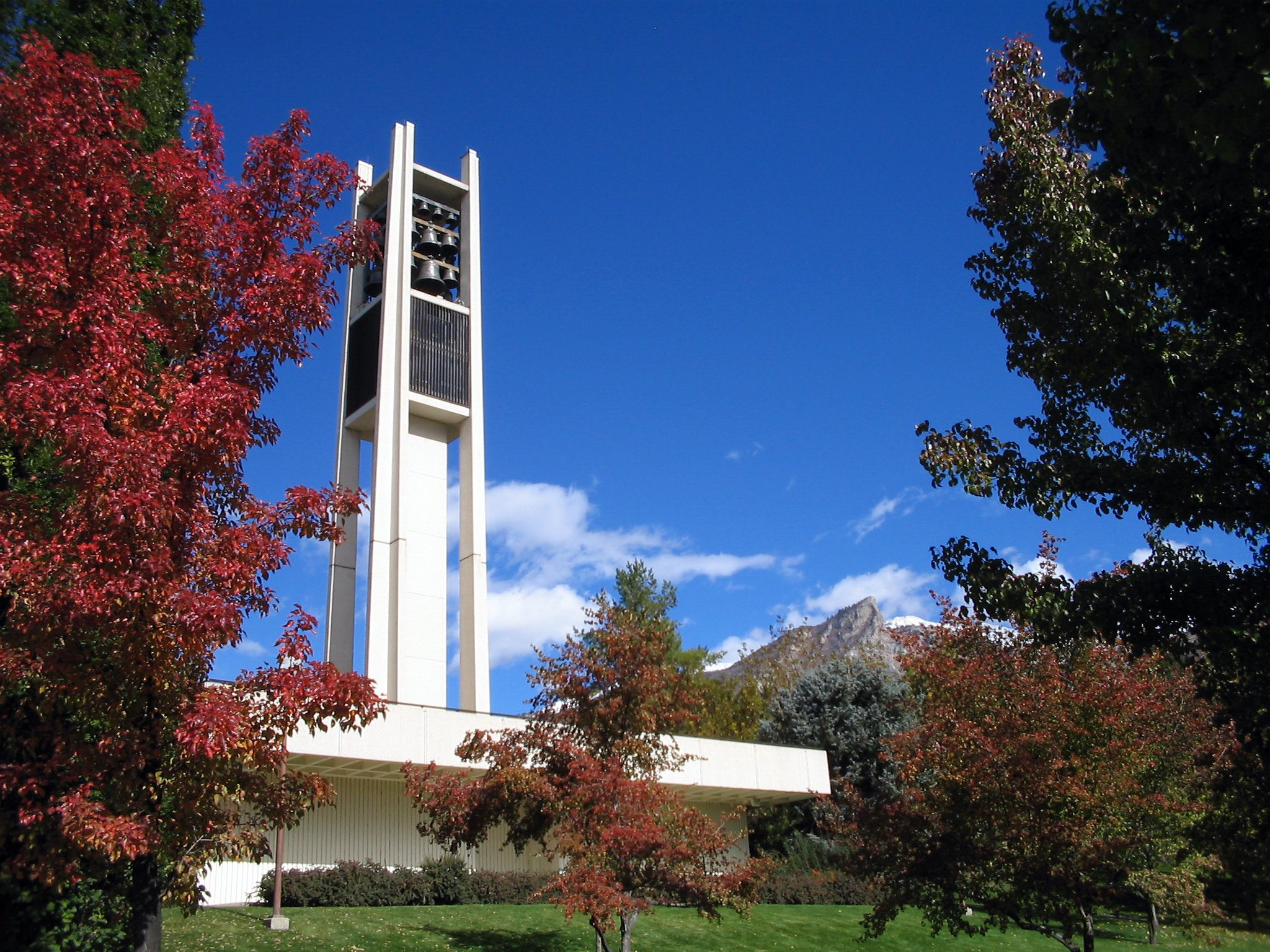
BYU Carillon Bell Tower

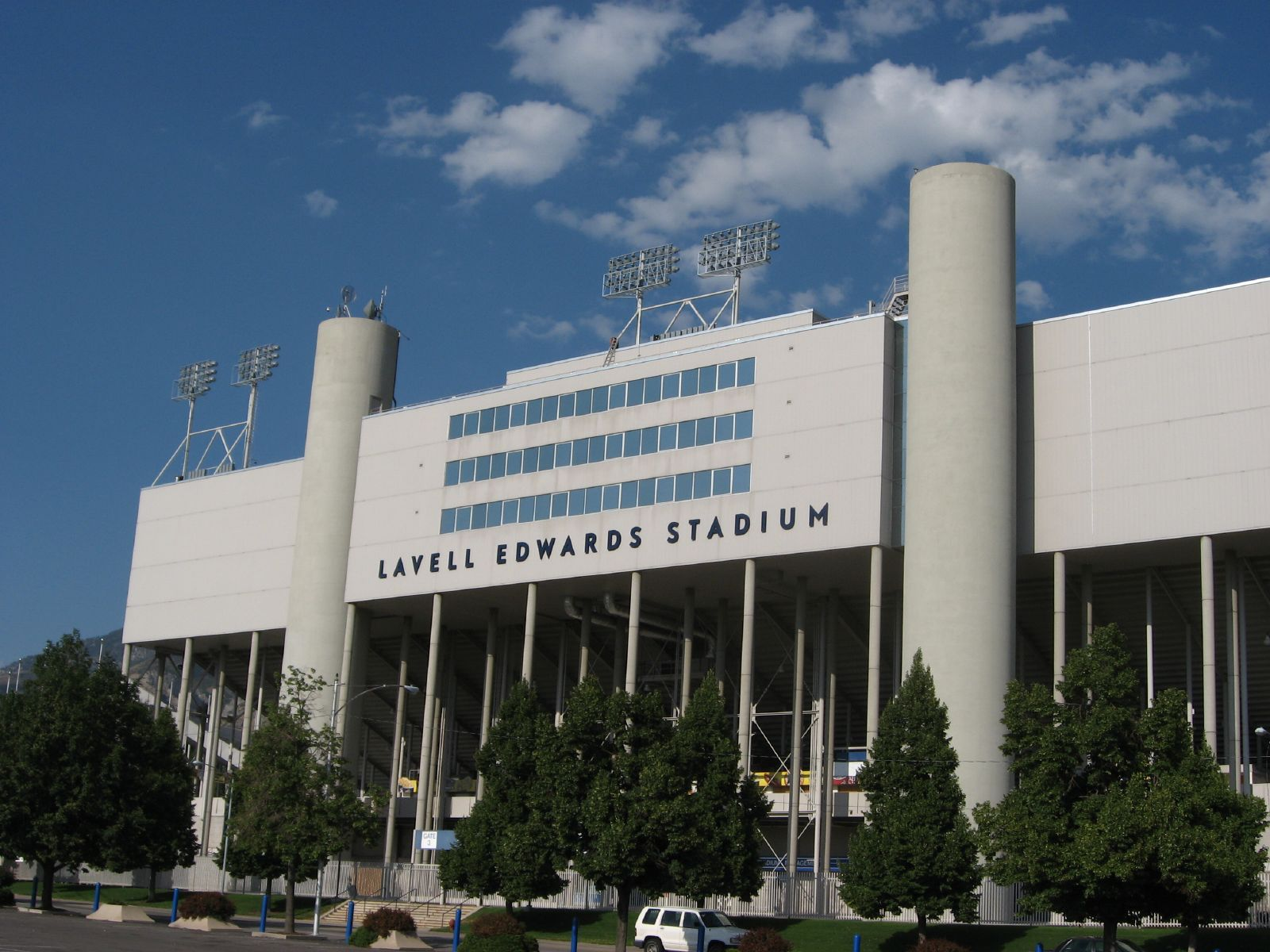
LaVell Edwards Stadium

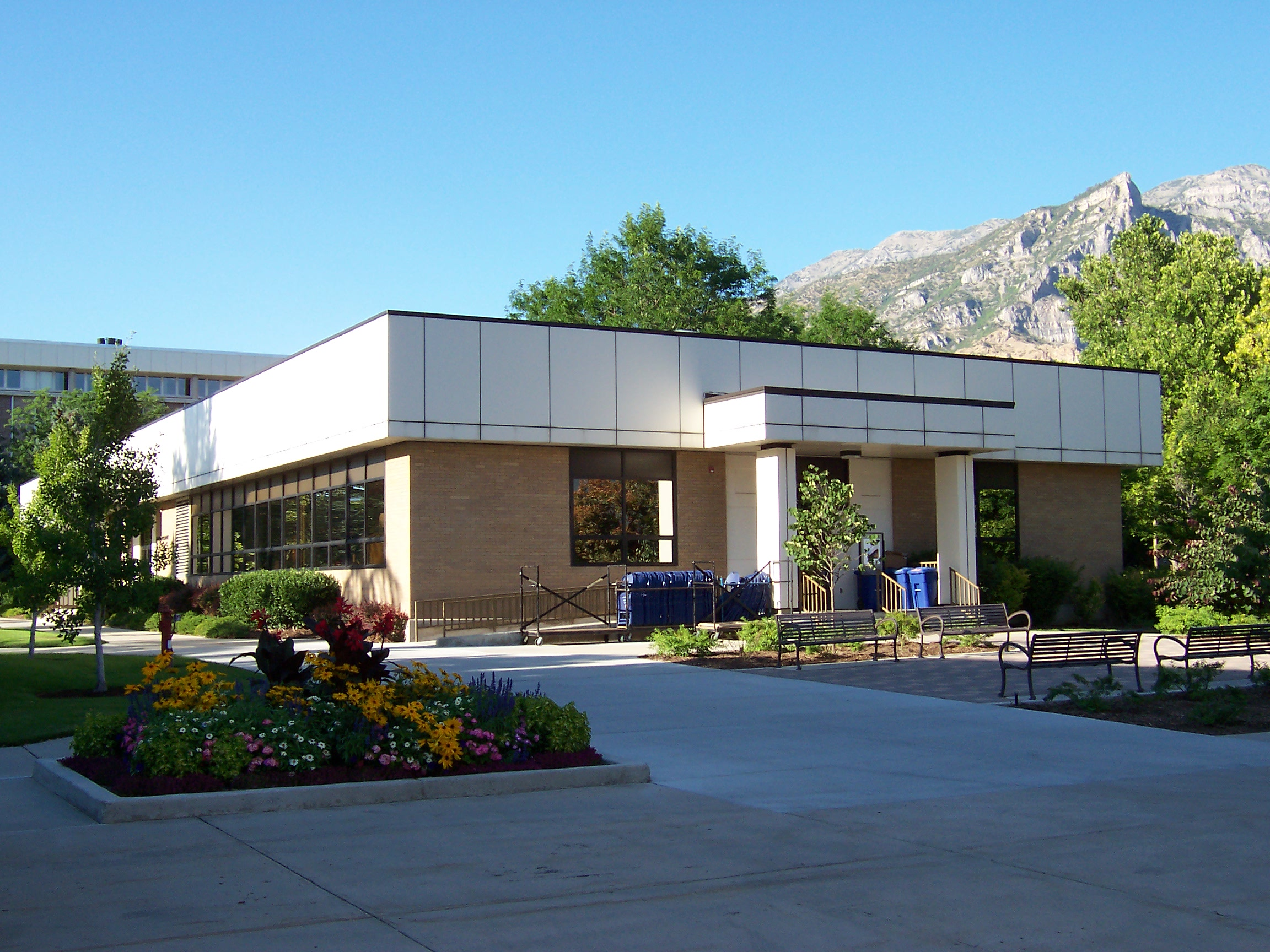
Herald R. Clark Building
