= Eureka LDS Church Meetinghouse =

- Old Mormon Meetinghouse
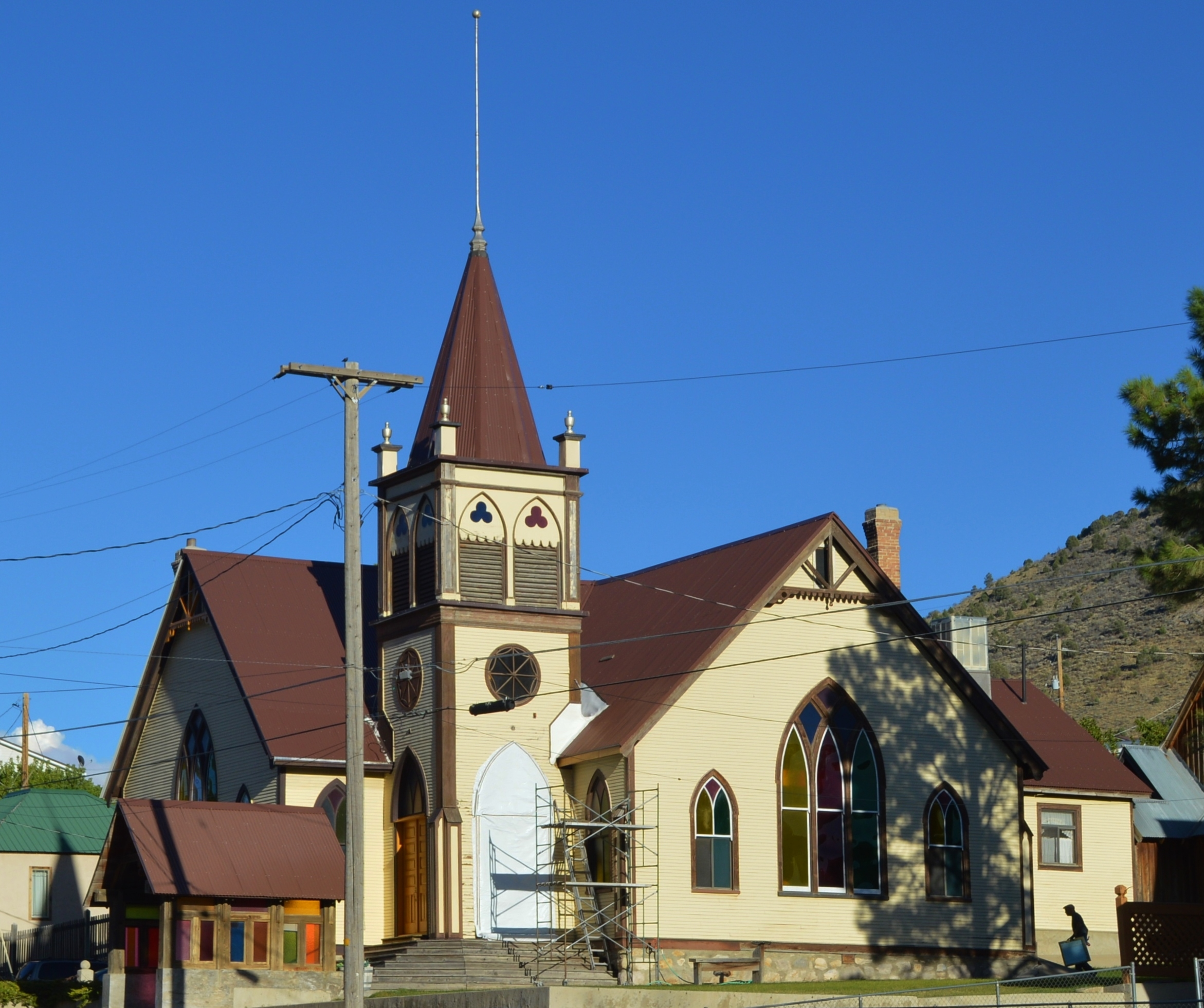
- The building in 2018
- Eureka LDS Church Meetinghouse
- 39.95495°N 112.11761°W
- Location: 137 Main Street, Eureka, Utah
- Country: United States
- Denomination: The Church of Jesus Christ of Latter-day Saints

History
- Status: Open: currently in use as an Airbnb
- Dedication: Apostle Reed Smoot
- Dedicated: 1903

Architecture
- Functional status: used
- Architect: Richard C. Watkins
- Architectural type: Gothic Revival
- Completed: 1902; 124 years ago
- Closed: 1976; 50 years ago

Eureka LDS Church Meetinghouse (also known as Old Mormon Meetinghouse) is a historic church at 137 Main Street in Eureka, Utah, United States. The work of architect Richard C. Watkins, it was built in 1902, dedicated the following year, and served as a meetinghouse until 1976. Its construction was funded by local resident John Beck (1843–1913).

The building was restored by the Ferrel Thomas family in 1988.
