= Winnemucca Grammar School =

- U.S. National Register of Historic Places
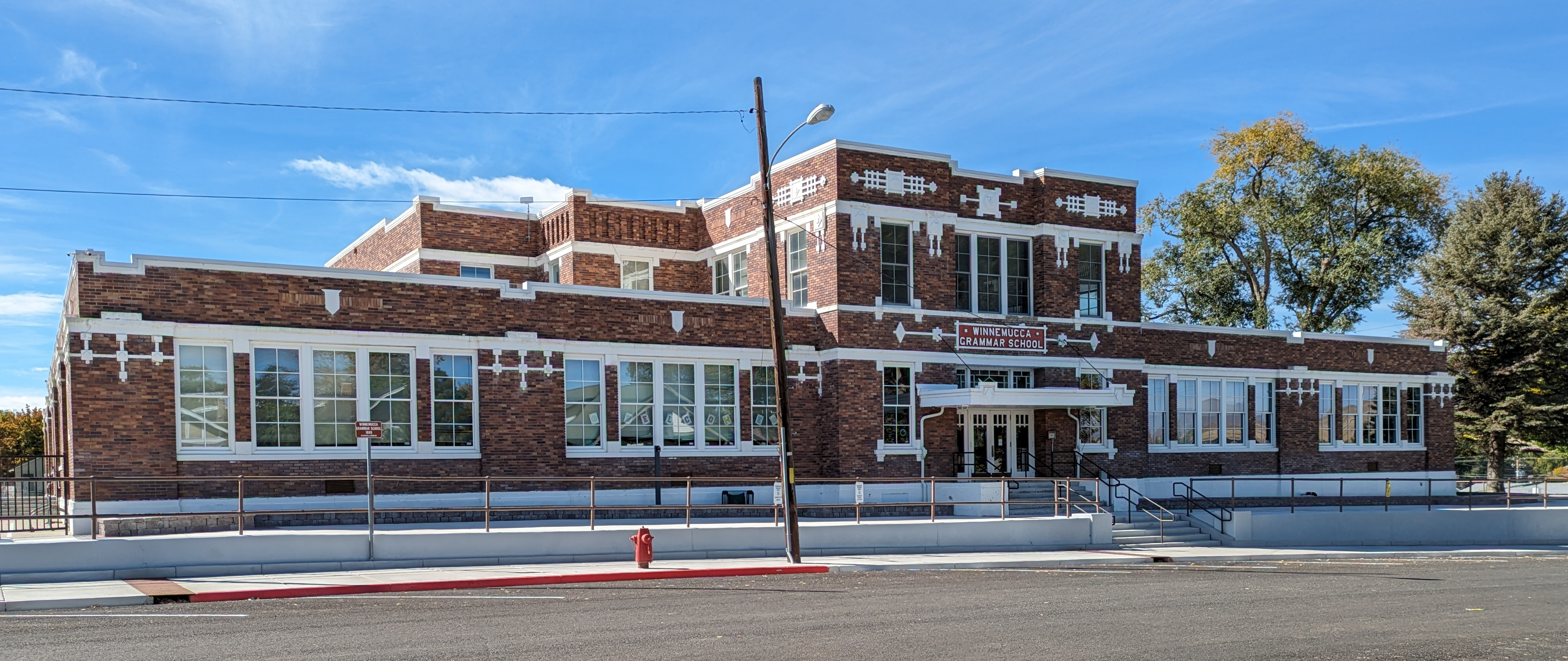

- Location within Nevada Location within the United States
- Location: 522 Lay St., Winnemucca, Nevada
- Area: less than one acre
- Built: 1927-28
- Architect: Watkins, Richard
- Architectural style: Prairie School
- NRHP reference No.: 91001654
- Added to NRHP: November 14, 1991

The Winnemucca Grammar School, located at 522 Lay St. in Winnemucca, Nevada, is a historic school that was designed by architect Richard Watkins in Prairie School style. It was built during 1927–28. It was listed on the National Register of Historic Places in 1991.

It was deemed significant as representing the period of rapid growth of Winnemucca from 1915 through the 1920s, and as a "good example" of Prairie Style school architecture. At the time of NRHP listing, the building remained a school, was in "excellent condition", and had been preserved with integrity.
