= Brigham Young University Centennial Carillon Tower =

Bell instrument in Provo, Utah, US

Coordinates: 40°15′10″N 111°38′51″W

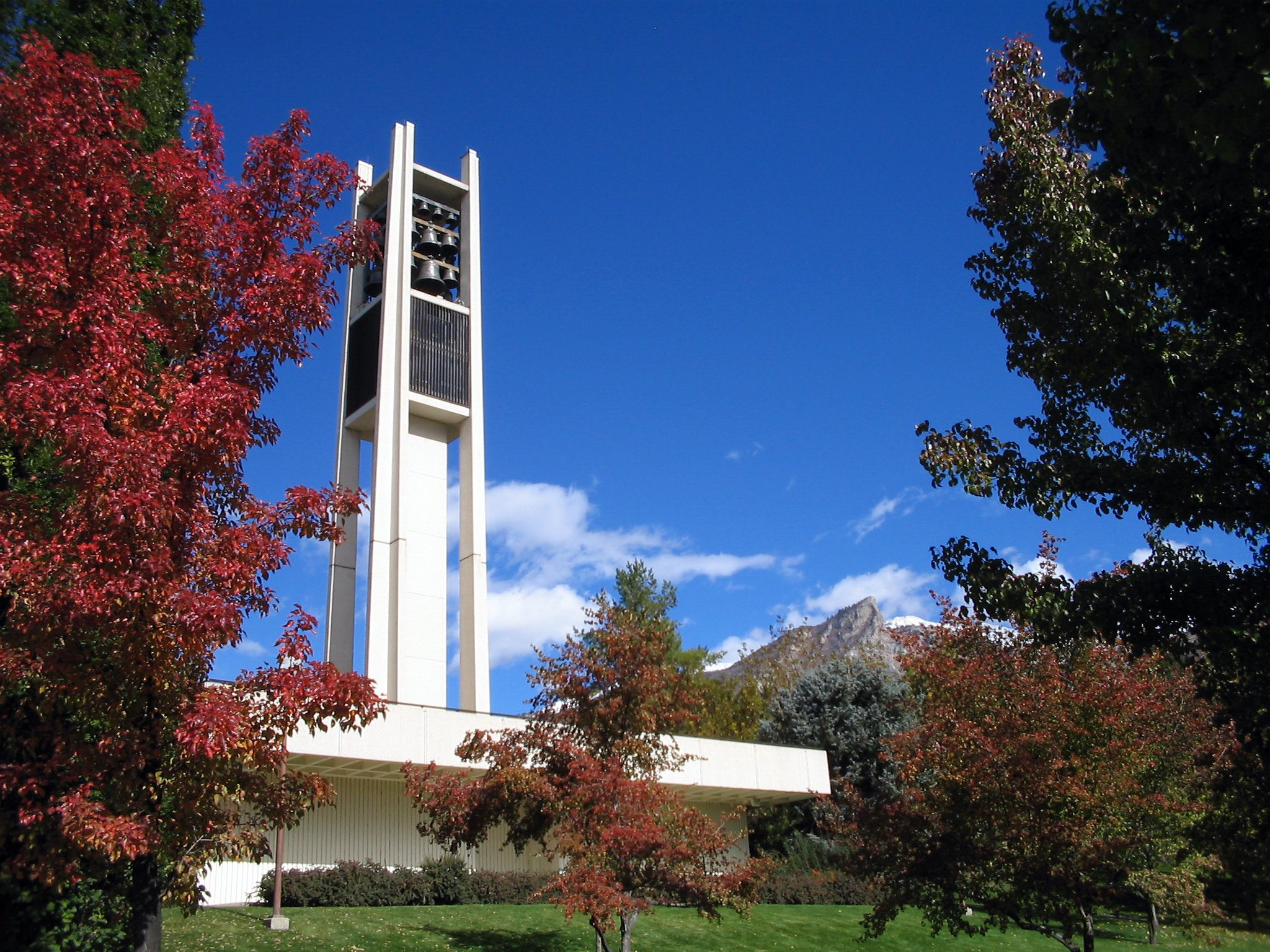
The BYU Centennial Carillon stands at the north end of campus

The BYU Centennial Carillon is a bell tower containing a carillon on the campus of Brigham Young University (BYU) in Provo, Utah, United States.

== Description ==
The bell tower was dedicated in October 1975 to commemorate the 100th anniversary of the school's founding. Built in a simple, modern style designed by architect Fred L. Markham, it is 97 feet (30 m) tall with 99 steps up a spiral stair case and 11 steps up a ladder to the carillon. The carillon contains 53 bells and the bells range in size from 21 lbs to 4,730 lbs. As part of the school's sesquicentennial celebration, an additional bell was added to the instrument in 2025.

At the top of every hour during the day, the carillon tolls the first few lines of a tune based on the hymn "Come, Come, Ye Saints," and also tolls a chime on the half-hour. The hour and half-hour strikes are controlled by an automated system. Carillonneurs may also play the instrument by means of a keyboard located directly below the belfry, in a small room reached by a spiral staircase that ascends through the center of the tower. Performers play on the carillon at regularly scheduled times, such as before and after religious sermons known as "devotionals", and on other special occasions or simply when the mood strikes them.

The carillon was constructed by Paulsen Construction Company with Markham & Markham Architects and Engineers doing the design work. BYU is owned by the Church of Jesus Christ of Latter-day Saints, and its carillon is the only such instrument the church owns. The church's meetinghouses rarely feature bell towers, and the only temple to contain a bell is in Nauvoo, Illinois.

== See also ==
- List of carillons in the United States
