= Hines Mansion =

Historic house in Utah, United States

- U.S. National Register of Historic Places
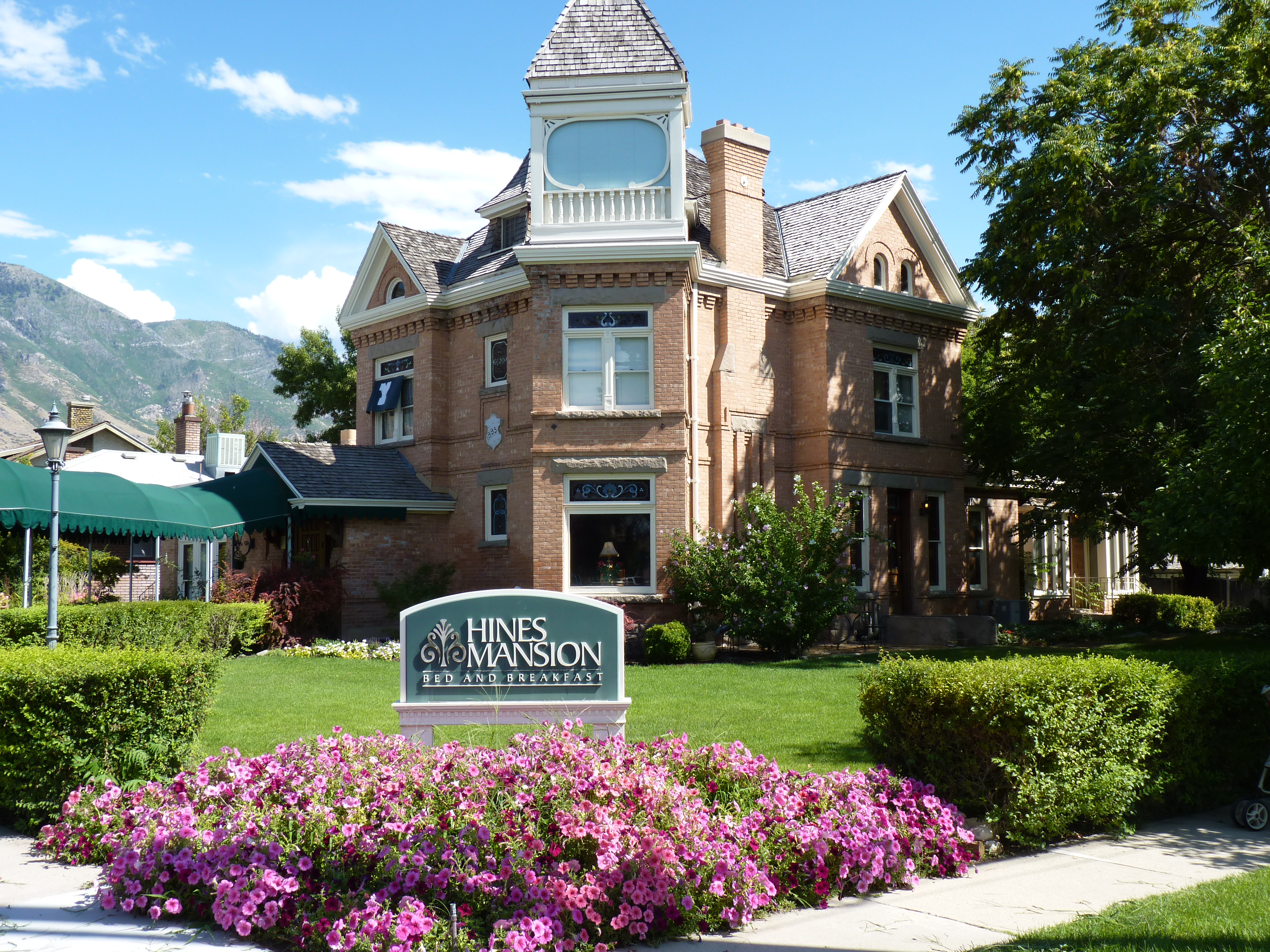
- Hines Mansion, August 2011

- Location within Utah Location within the United States
- Interactive map showing the location of Hines Mansion
- Location: 383 West 100 South; Provo, Utah; United States
- Coordinates: 40°14′55″N 111°39′55″W
- Area: less than one acre
- Built: 1895
- Architect: Richard K.A. Kletting or Richard C. Watkins
- Architectural style: Victorian
- NRHP reference No.: 78002702
- Added to NRHP: July 12, 1978

The Hines Mansion is a historic house in Provo, Utah, United States. It is listed on the National Register of Historic Places. It was built in 1895 for R. Spencer Hines and his wife Kitty. At the time the mansion was built, it was recognized as one of the finest homes in Provo. The Hines Mansion was designated to the Provo City Historic Landmarks Registry on March 7, 1996.

== The House ==
The R. Spencer and Kitty Hines Mansion is a Victorian-style mansion built in 1895 of brick with brown and orange coloration. Two and a half stories high, it is loosely square with four extended gabled wings. The main floor of the inside contains a kitchen, parlor, livingroom, and stairway. The second floor contains several rooms used as bedrooms originally. The decorative features visible from the outside of the home include stained glass, extended gabled wings, corbeled brick belt courses, and a corbeled dentil band which runs continuously around the entire building. The home is currently up to building-code standards and currently functions as a bed and breakfast.

== Russel and Kitty Hines ==
R. Spencer Hines was a businessman who gained money from several avenues, namely real estate, business, and mining. Among other businesses he owned a drug store-saloon. At this time in Utah's history, liquor could technically only be sold for "medicinal purposes only" at drugstores. Hine was brought to court twice in a decade to contend about the amount of alcohol purchased from his store. His drug store, known as Hine's Palace Drug Store, was managed by Charles A. Hedquist and located at 104 West Center.

Kitty Ann Leetham Hines was the daughter of Ann and John Leetham. John Leetham, her father, is listed in the city of Provo as a "Provo Indian War Veteran". After her husband died in 1898, Kitty was left alone to care for the mansion, its value estimated at $28,000. Kitty proved able to care for herself, by participating in many employment ventures, such as the Hines-Kimber Grocery and Heat Company, the Provo Mining Company (for which she served as vice president), the Lost Josephene Gold Mining Company, the Lead-Bullion Mining and Milling Company, and the state bank of Provo. The Provo Mining company was sold for twenty thousand dollars to the U.S. Smelting and Refining Company in 1914.

Kitty left the home in 1906, relocating to California. In 1922 her home was purchased by Bert and Sarah Bowen. Their daughter Maude married a Benjamin Frank Roper, and the house passed to them for 34 years.

== See also ==
- National Register of Historic Places listings in Utah County, Utah
