= Maeser Elementary =

- Maeser Elementary School
- U.S. National Register of Historic Places
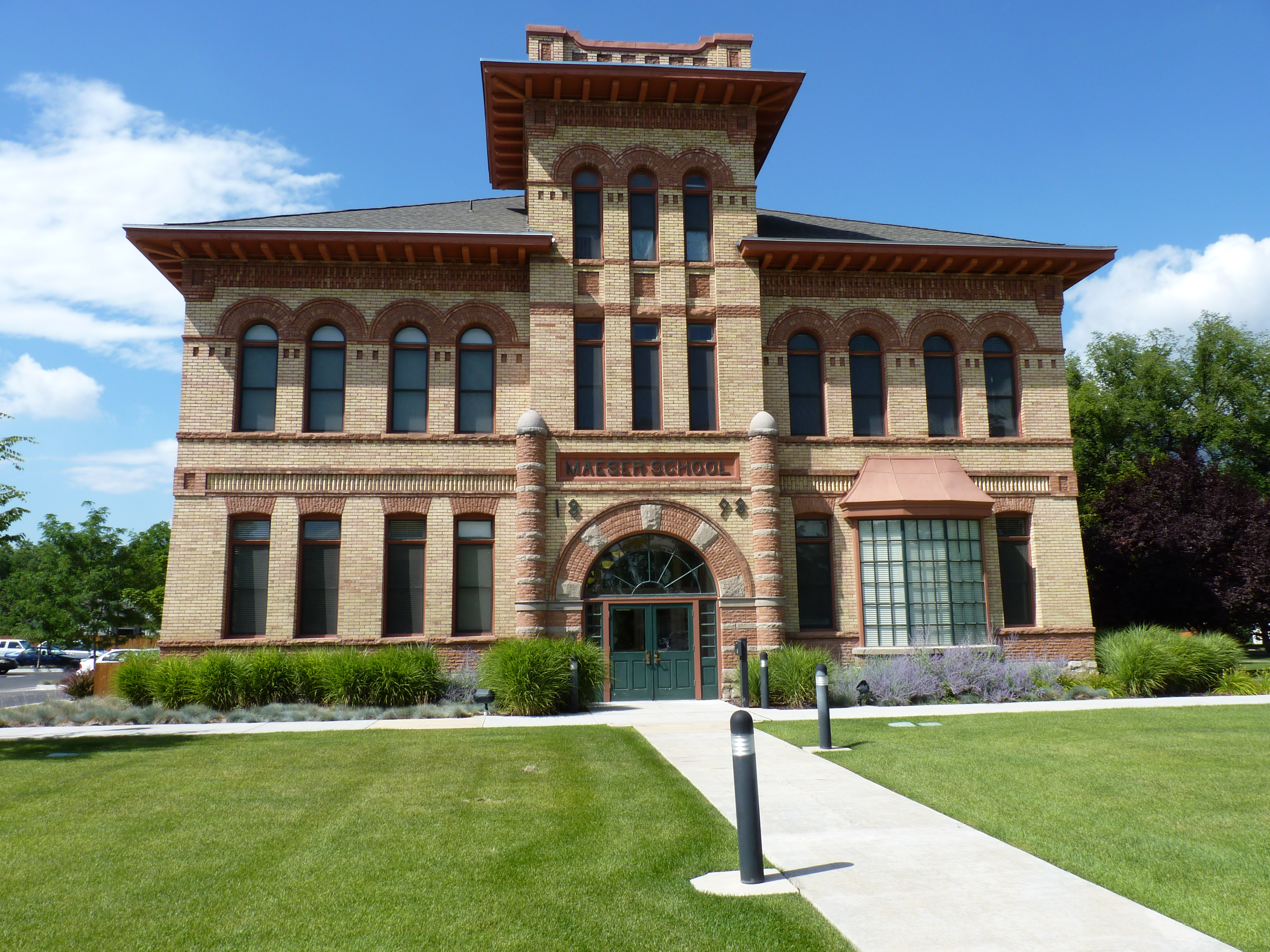
- Maeser Elementary School

- Location within Utah Location within the United States
- Location: 150 South 500 East; Provo, Utah
- Coordinates: 40°13′52″N 111°38′57″W
- Area: approximately 4 acres (1.6 ha)
- Built: 1908
- Architect: Richard C. Watkins
- Architectural style: Mission/Spanish Revival, Romanesque Revival
- MPS: Entrepreneurial Residences of Turn-of-the-Century Provo TR
- NRHP reference No.: 82004177
- Added to NRHP: July 26, 1982

Maeser Elementary was an elementary school in Provo, Utah. It was named after Karl G. Maeser. Built in 1898, it is the oldest school building in Provo, Utah. The school was designed by architect Richard C. Watkins, who also designed the Provo Third Ward Chapel and Amusement Hall, The Knight Block Building, and the Thomas N. Taylor Mansion.

== Karl G. Maeser ==
Karl G. Maeser was born in Germany. Karl Maeser and his wife Anna Therese Meith were baptized into the LDS Church in 1855, and left shortly thereafter for Utah. Detained on their journey due to their decision to serve various missions for the church, the Maesers did not arrive in Utah until 1860.

In Utah, Maeser operated various schools and served other missions until the year 1876, where he was called to establish an academy in the name of the church. The academy he established was known as the Brigham Young Academy, now Brigham Young University. Karl G. Maeser served as director, principal, and instructor of the academy. Heber J. Grant, a president of the LDS church stated, "Some of our outstanding men... attribute largely to the force of character of Brother Maeser and the impression made upon them while under his influence their successes in life."

== History ==
The present site of Provo was settled by members of the Church of Jesus Christ of Latter-day Saints (LDS Church) in 1849 when Fort Utah was built near the Provo River. The Mormons, fleeing from persecution in Nauvoo, Illinois, headed west under the direction of Brigham Young and established themselves in the Great Salt Lake area in Utah. Provo was the first settlement in Utah Valley and was part of a plan to establish a chain of communities extending from Salt Lake City. The Mormon communities were planned according to a grid system set forth by their leaders.

The first schools in Provo were sometimes held in public buildings and private residences. In the year 1851, the Provo City council gained power to establish, support and regulate common schools, and in 1853 property taxes were approved for building schools. Before the 1870s in Provo, school buildings were small adobe structures. Then in 1875 one united school district was formed and an era of better buildings and schools began. In 1898 the Board of Education approved plans for the construction of Maeser Elementary. The school was dedicated November 9, 1898 with Karl G. Maeser as guest of honor.

It was listed on the National Register of Historic Places in 1998, with note that it was then the oldest public school in Provo that was still in use, and that it "is one of the best-preserved examples of the work of Utah architect Richard Watkins".

== Today ==
Maeser School's enrollment dwindled until the decision was made in 2001 to close its doors. The 6th grade class of 2002 was the final graduating class from Maeser School. The future of the historic Maeser School became what then-Mayor Lewis K. Billings called "The second biggest building controversy in the history of Provo." The Maeser School was redeveloped by the Provo City Housing Authority as senior housing. Now known as Maeser School Apartments, the redevelopment project has won several awards, including a HGTV Historic Preservation grant, a Reader's Choice award from Affordable Housing Finance, and a "Best in State" award for City planning.

The Daily Herald reported: "Somehow, it seems appropriate that historic Maeser School long sheltered young children under its roof and now houses senior residents. After all, it is the very old who most often stop to recall the memories and feelings of how it was to be very young. Perhaps even some elderly folks who attended Maeser School as children will find a welcome reunion and home within its walls in the coming years."

== Sources ==
- Historic Provo. 2002 Provo City Landmarks Commission.
- Temme, Debbie; Cannon, Ken; Hartman, Cheryl. National Register of Historic Places Inventory—Nomination Form. United States Department of the Interior Heritage Conservation and Recreation Service. Summer 1980.
