= Manti Carnegie Library =

- U.S. National Register of Historic Places
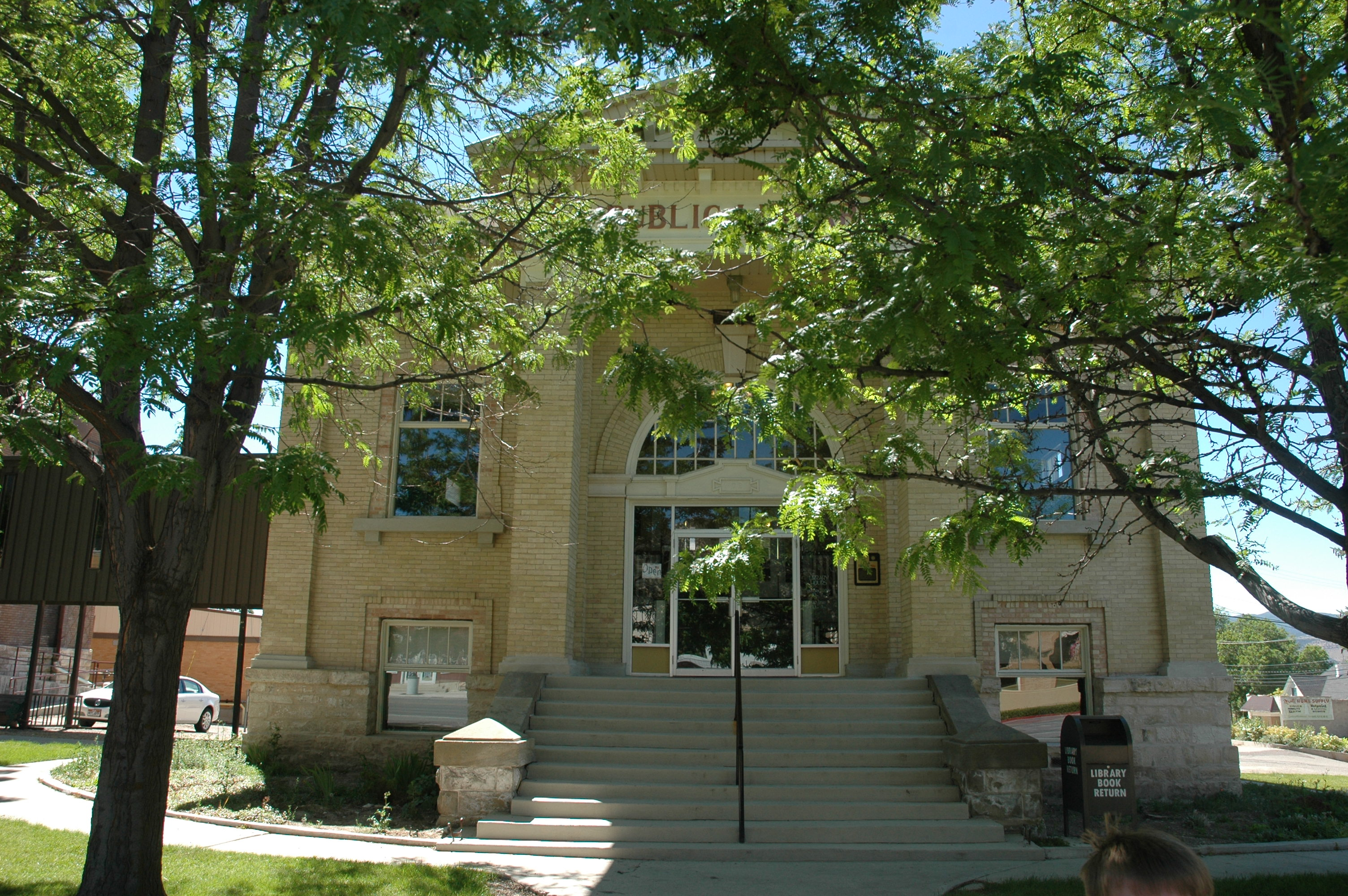
- The library in 2011

- Location within Utah Location within the United States
- Location: 12 South Main Street, Manti, Utah
- Coordinates: 39°15′55″N 111°37′59″W
- Area: less than one acre
- Built: 1910
- Built by: Fredericksen & Sons
- Architect: Watkins & Birch;
- Architectural style: Classical Revival
- MPS: Carnegie Library TR
- NRHP reference No.: 84000150
- Added to NRHP: October 25, 1984

The Manti Carnegie Library is a historic building in Manti, Utah. It was built in 1910-1911 as a Carnegie library, and designed in the Classical Revival style by Richard C. Watkins and John F. Birch. It has been listed on the National Register of Historic Places since October 25, 1984.
