= Richard C. Watkins =

English-born American architect

Richard Charles Watkins (August 22, 1858 – April 9, 1941), an immigrant from Bristol, England, was an American architect throughout the intermountain west in the late 19th and early 20th centuries. In his early career, he interned with Richard K.A. Kletting in Salt Lake City. In 1890, he came to Provo, Utah as a construction supervisor, and opened his own firm in 1892. When he left nearly 20 years later he had become the most prominent architect south of Salt Lake City, Utah. His works include designing over 240 schools in the intermountain west of the United States including (Peteetneet, Maeser, Winnemucca, Spring City). He served as the architect for Utah State Schools between 1912 and 1920. He also designed businesses ( Knight Block Building, First National Bank of Provo), courthouses (Piute County Courthouse, Uintah County Courthouse, Carbon County Courthouse), eight Carnegie libraries (Provo, Cedar City, Manti, Garland, Richmond, Ephraim, Eureka, Richfield), churches (Provo Third Ward Chapel and Amusement Hall, Spring City Chapel, Mt. Pleasant South Ward) and homes (Knight-Allen House, Thomas N. Taylor House). A number of his buildings survive and are listed on the U.S. National Register of Historic Places.

== Personal life ==
Richard Charles Watkins was born to Charles and Elizabeth Watkins in Bristol, England. He immigrated with his parents to Ogden, Utah in 1872. In 1881, he married Lucy Greenwell of Ogden, formerly from Dunton Bassett. They had three children prior to her untimely death in 1887. Subsequently, Richard married Emma Wold in 1889 in Ogden and together they had 9 children. Richard died April 9, 1941.

== Architectural works ==
=== Images of listings on National Register of Historic Places ===
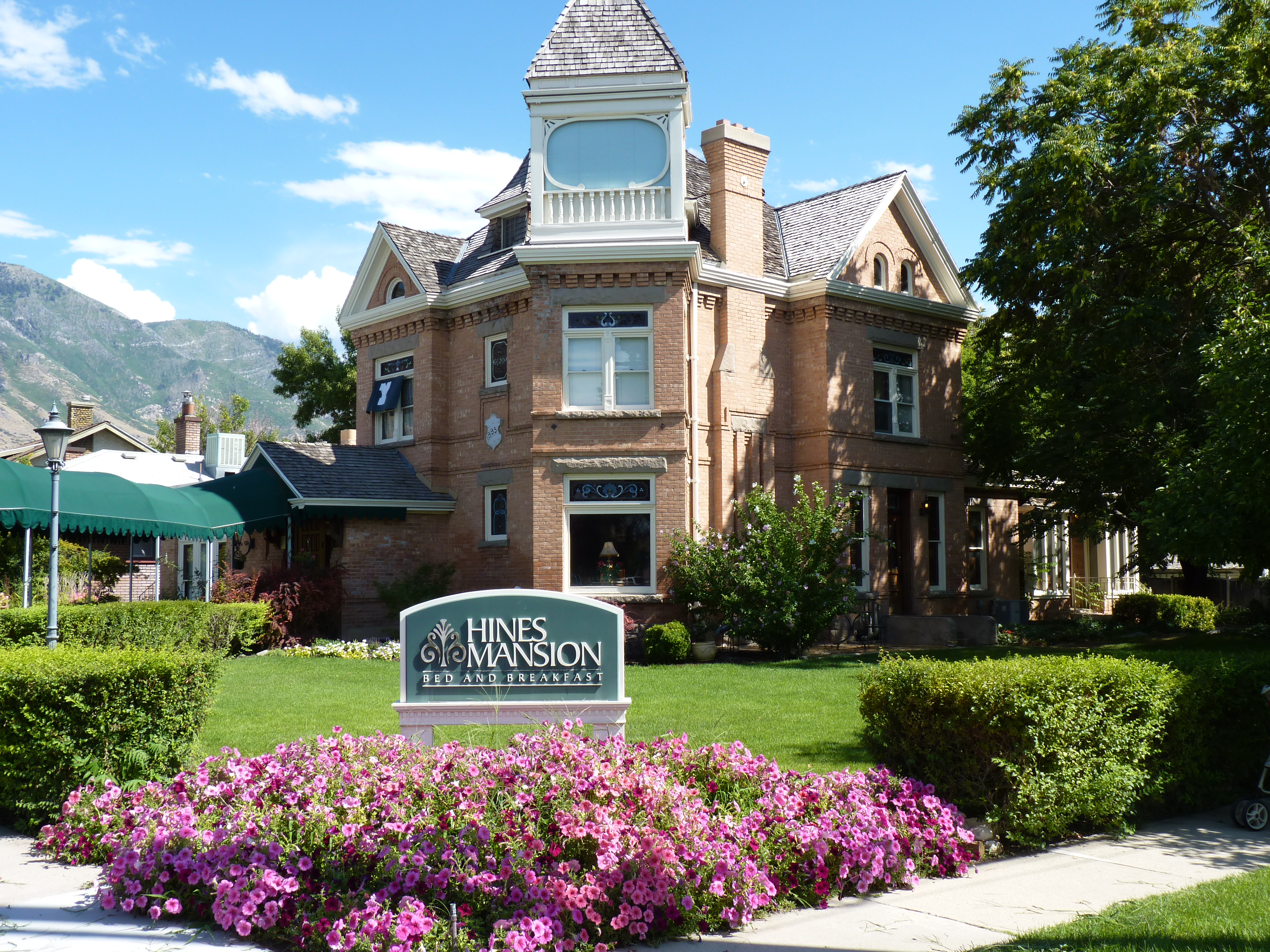
Hines Mansion (1895)

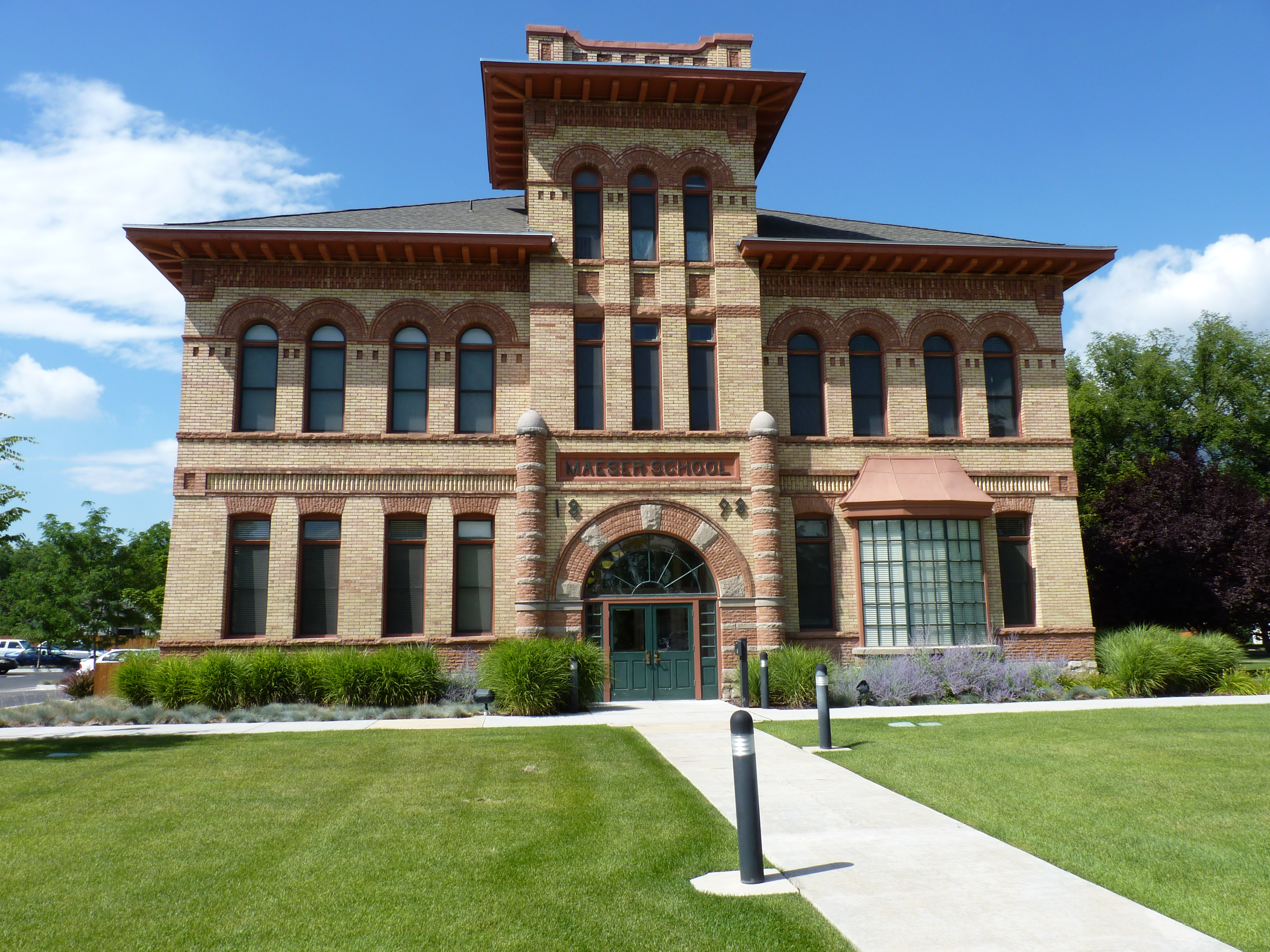
Maeser Elementary (1898)

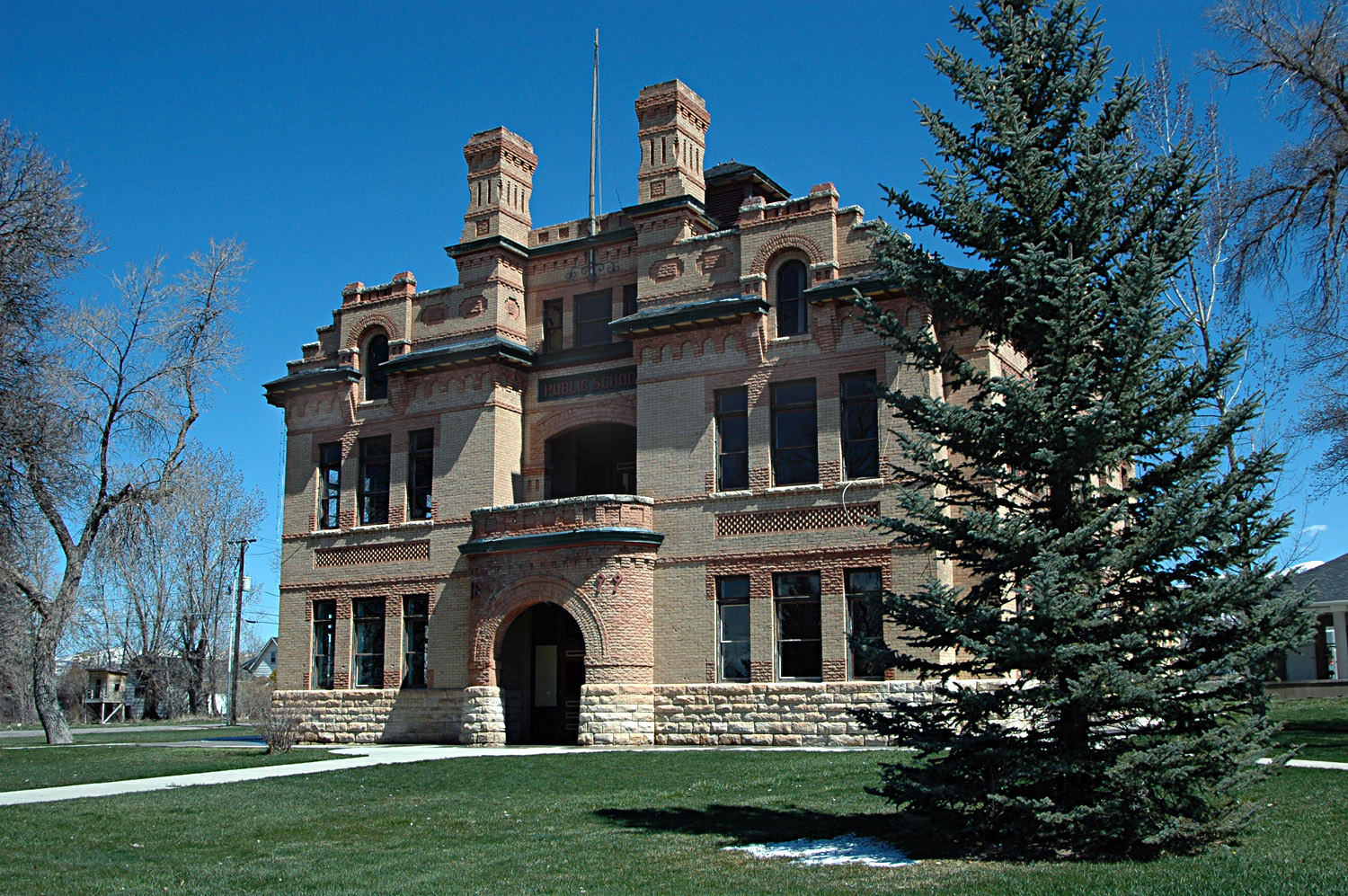
Old Spring City School (1899)

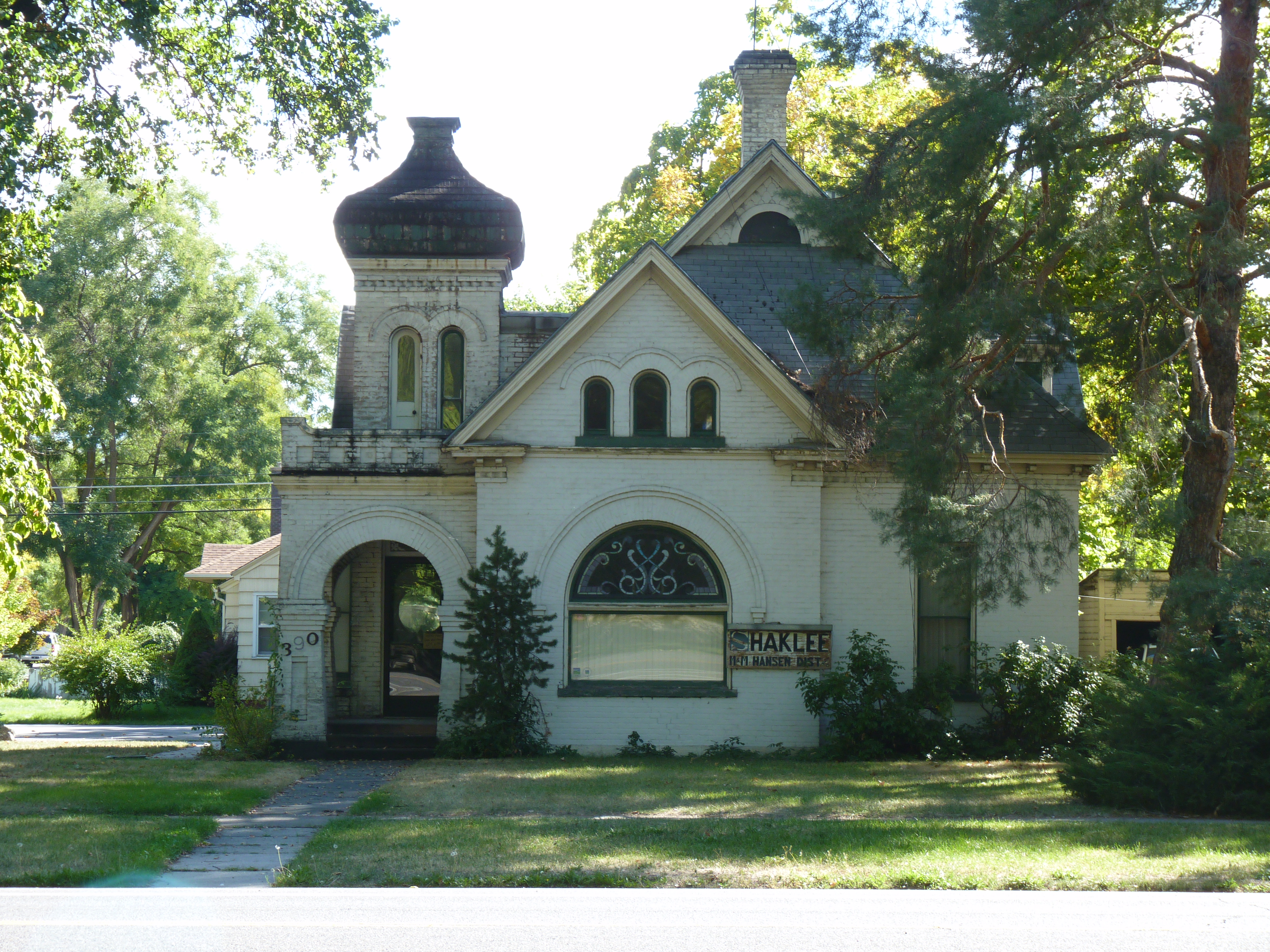
Knight-Allen House (1899)

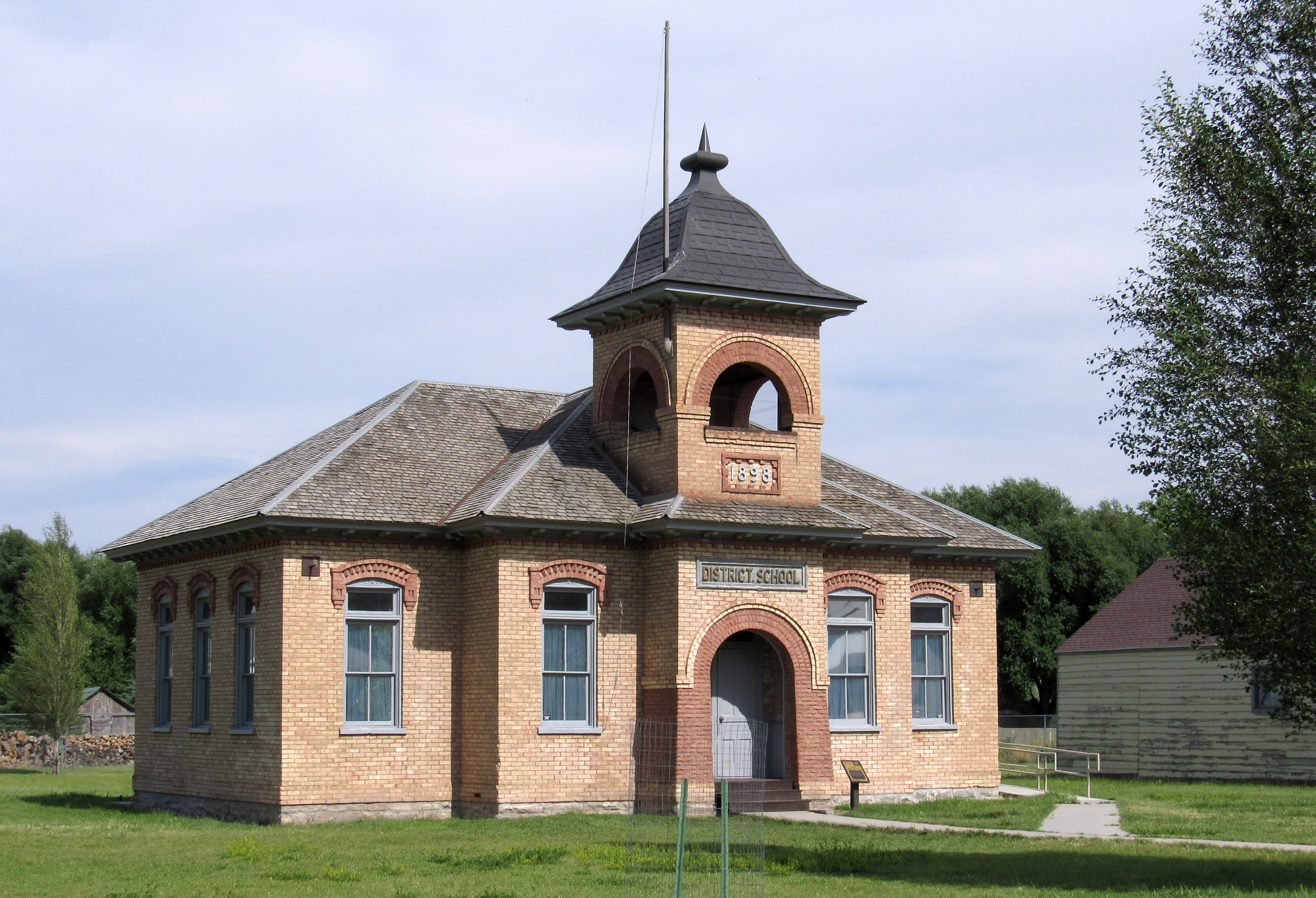
Fairfield District School (1898)

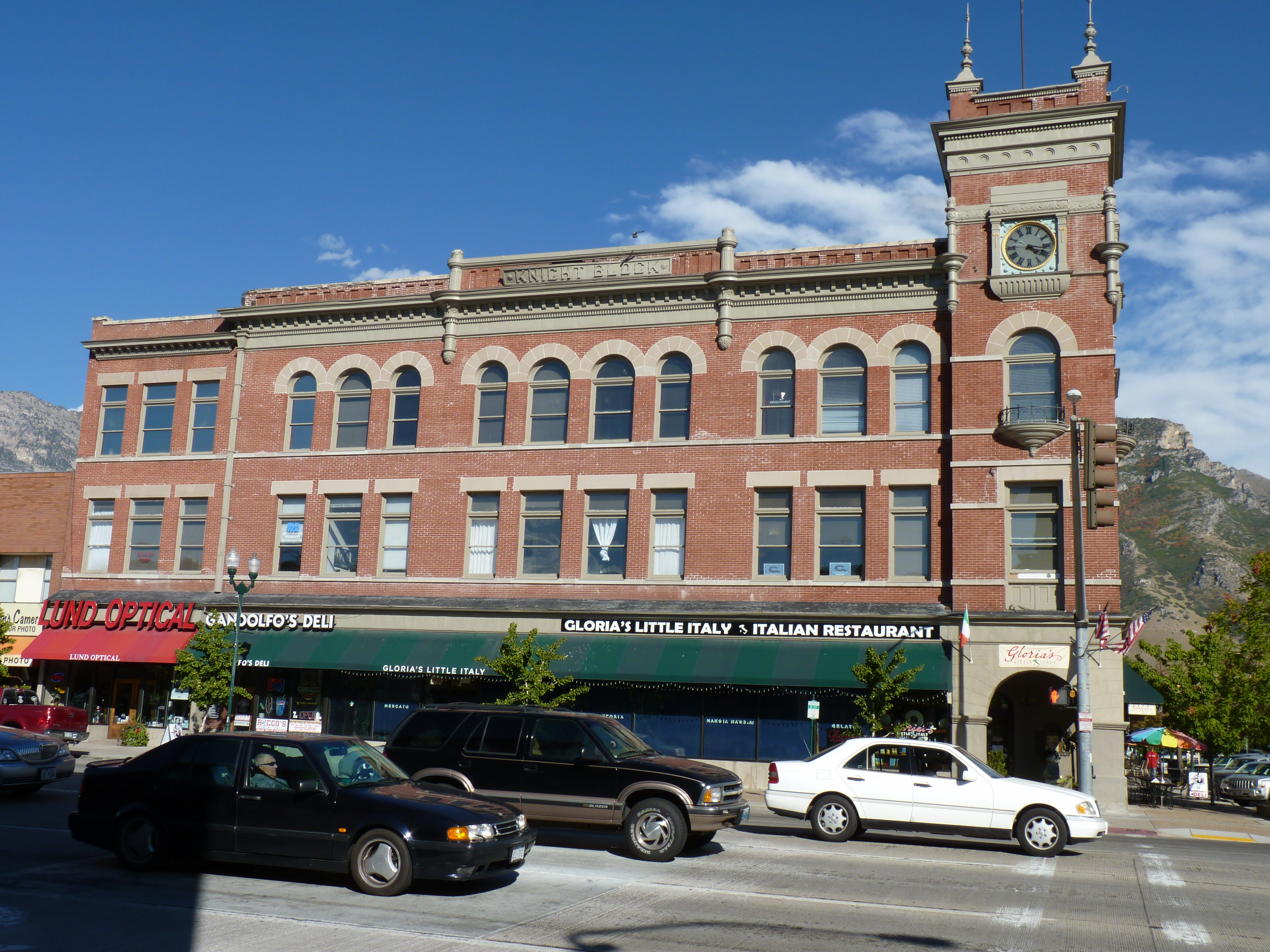
Knight Block (1900)

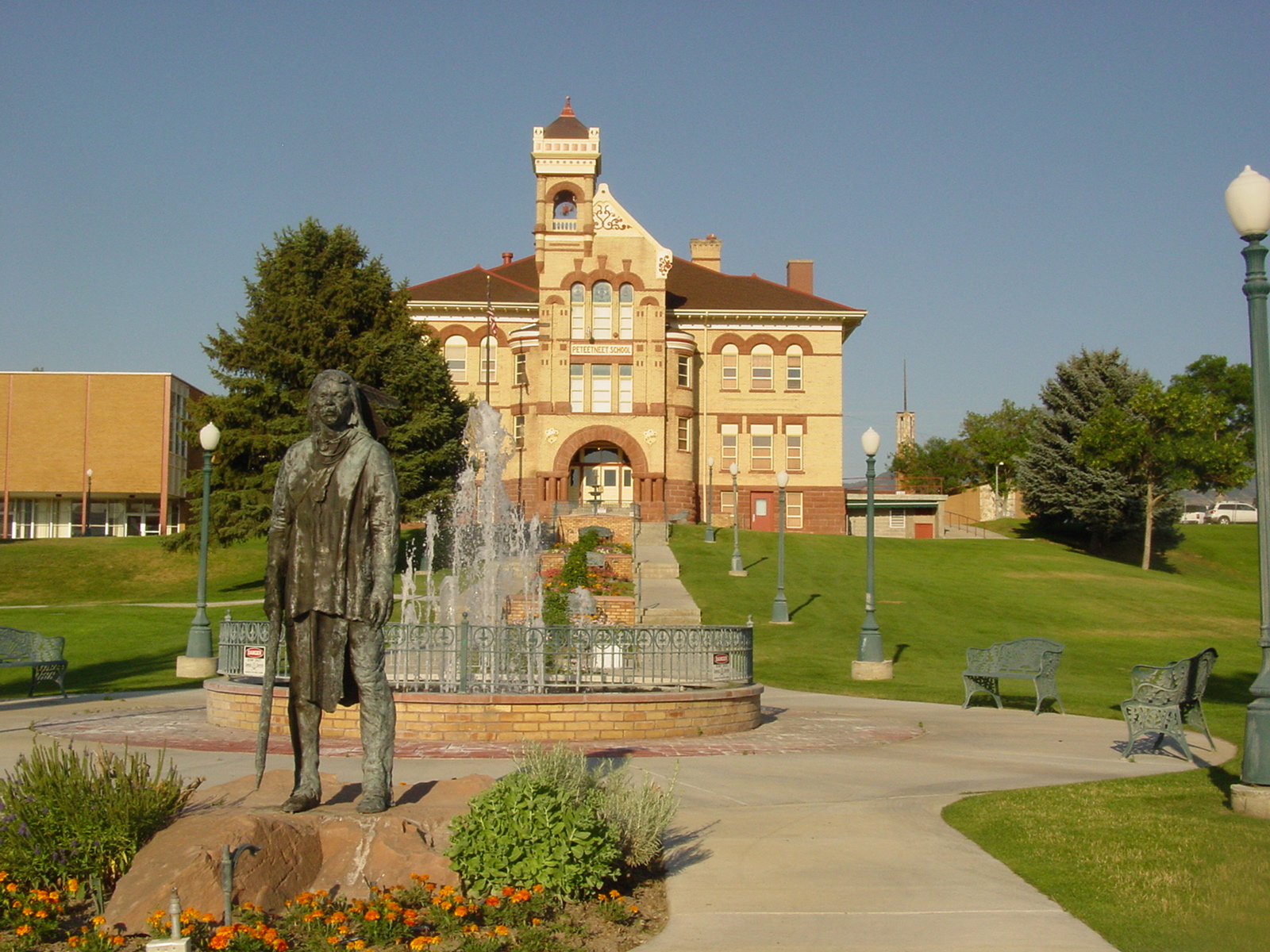
Peteetneet School (1901)

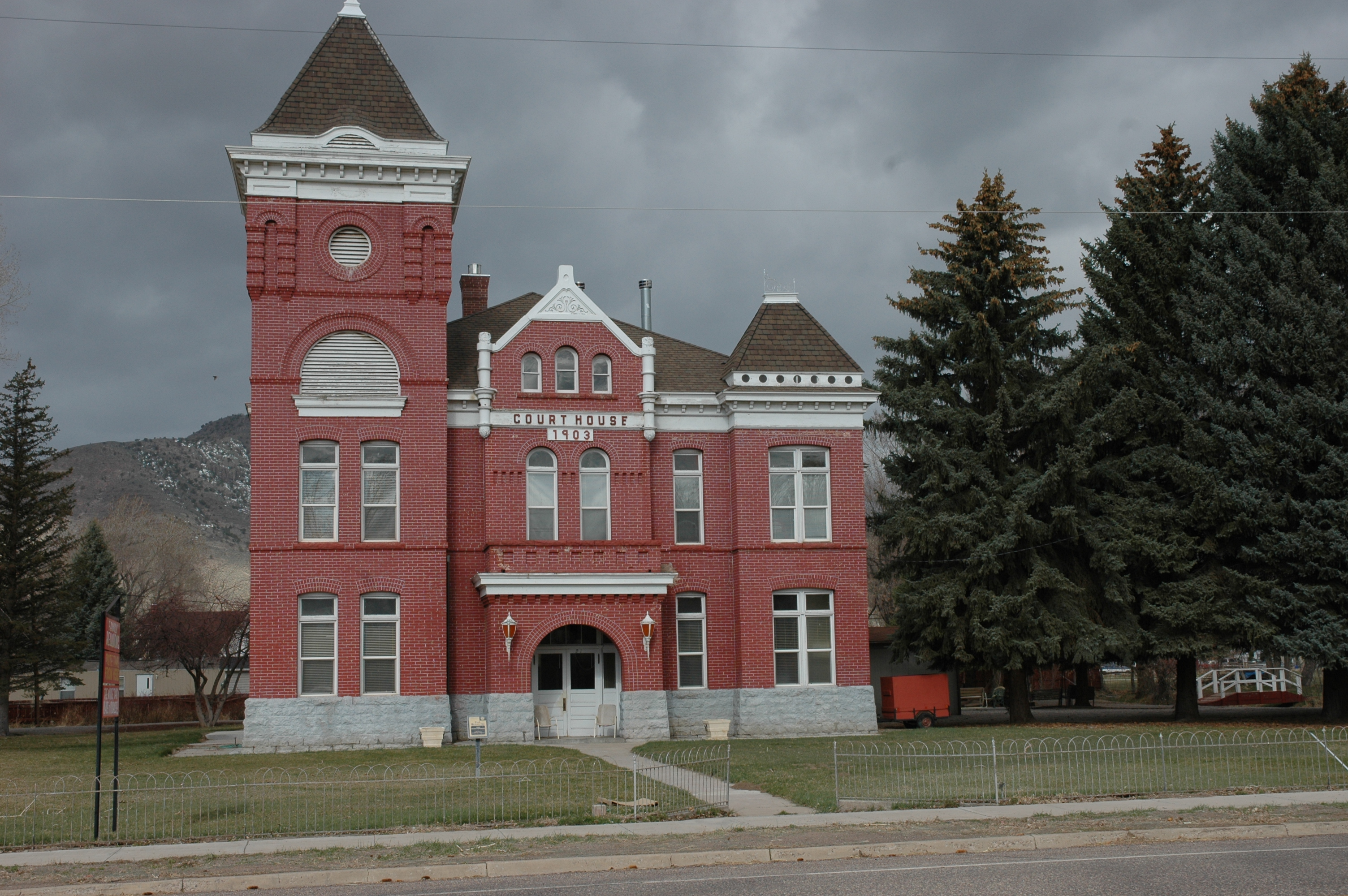
Piute County Courthouse (1903)

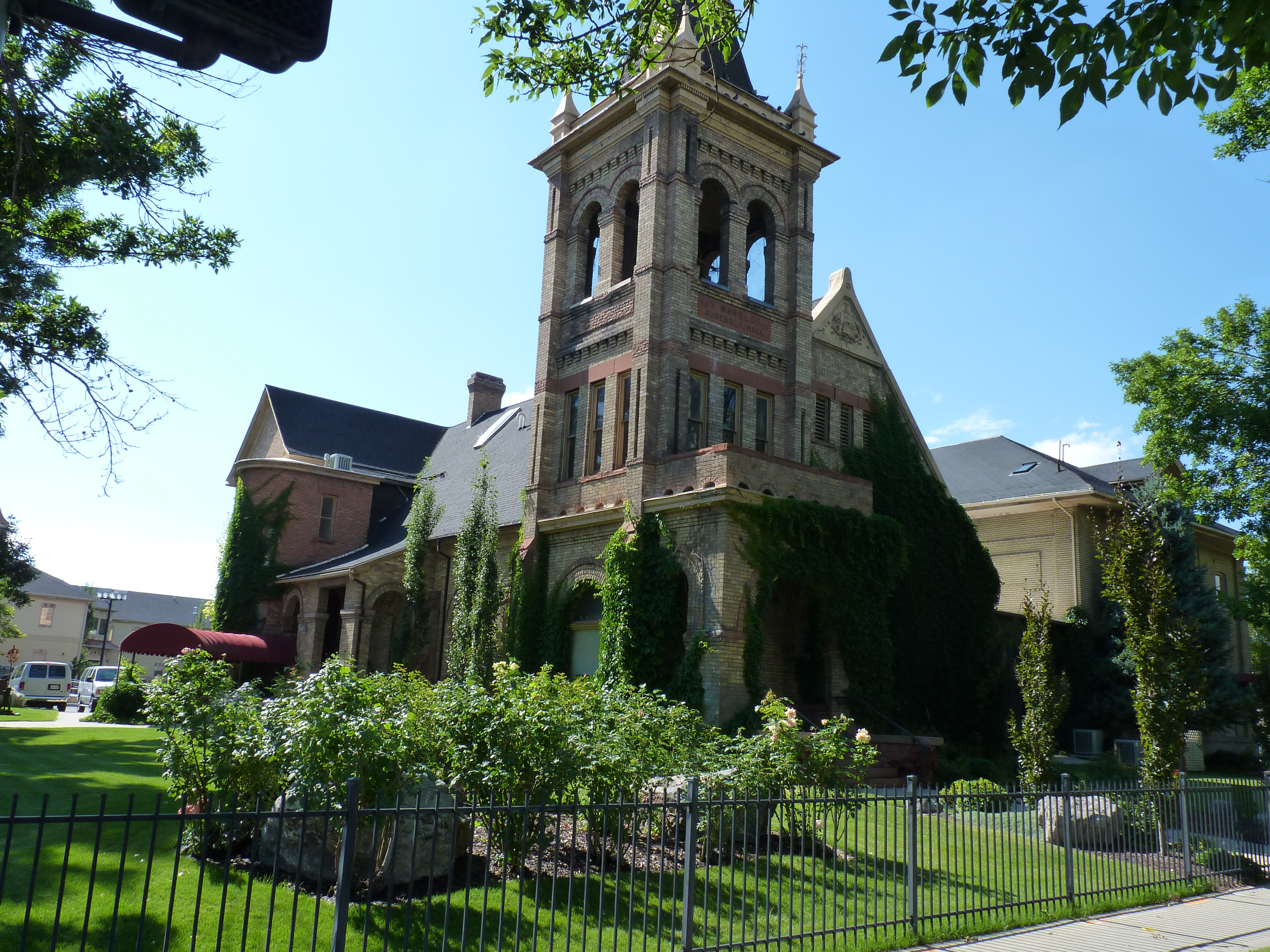
Provo Third Ward Chapel and Amusement Hall (1903)

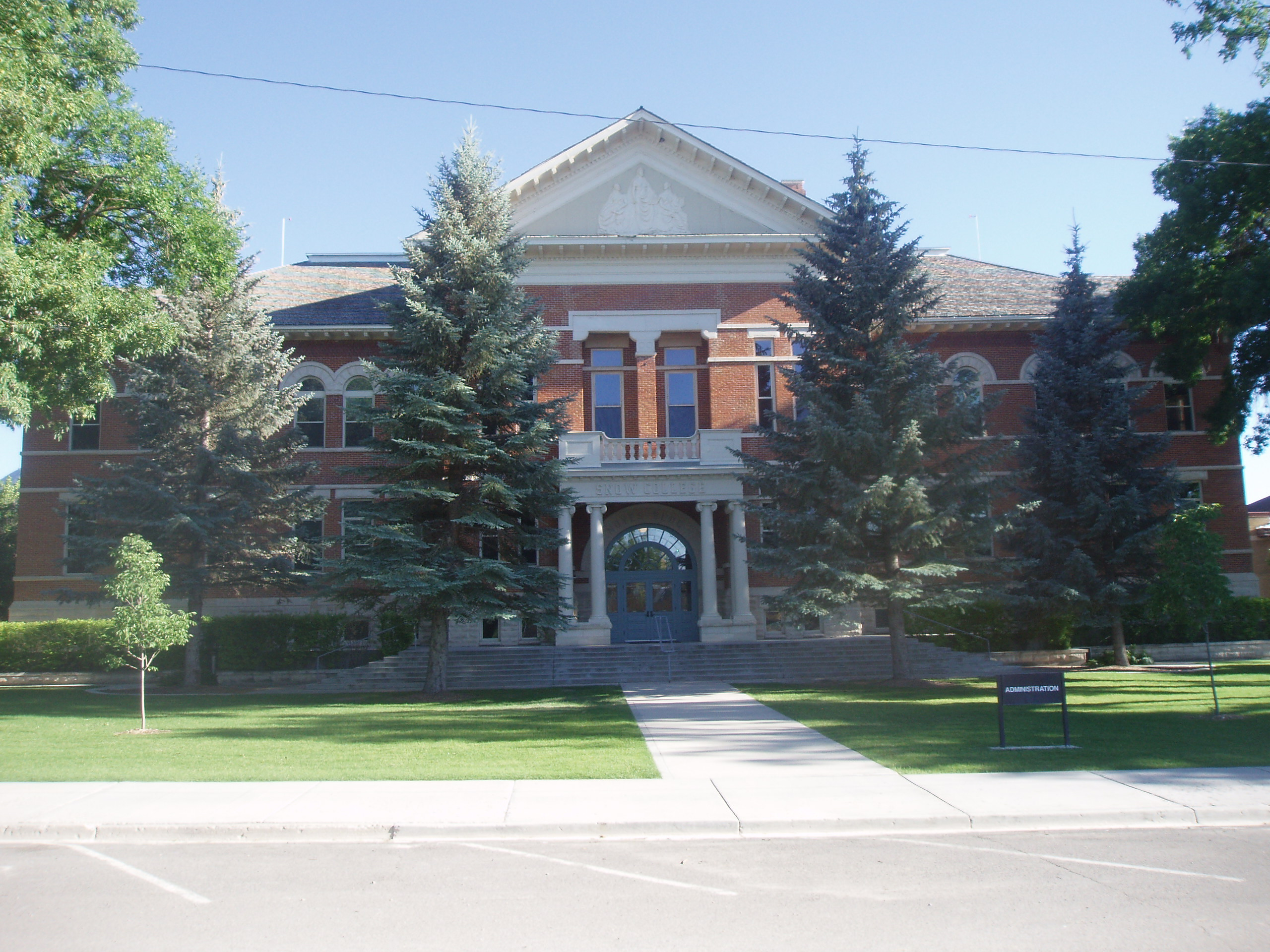
Snow Academy Building (1908)

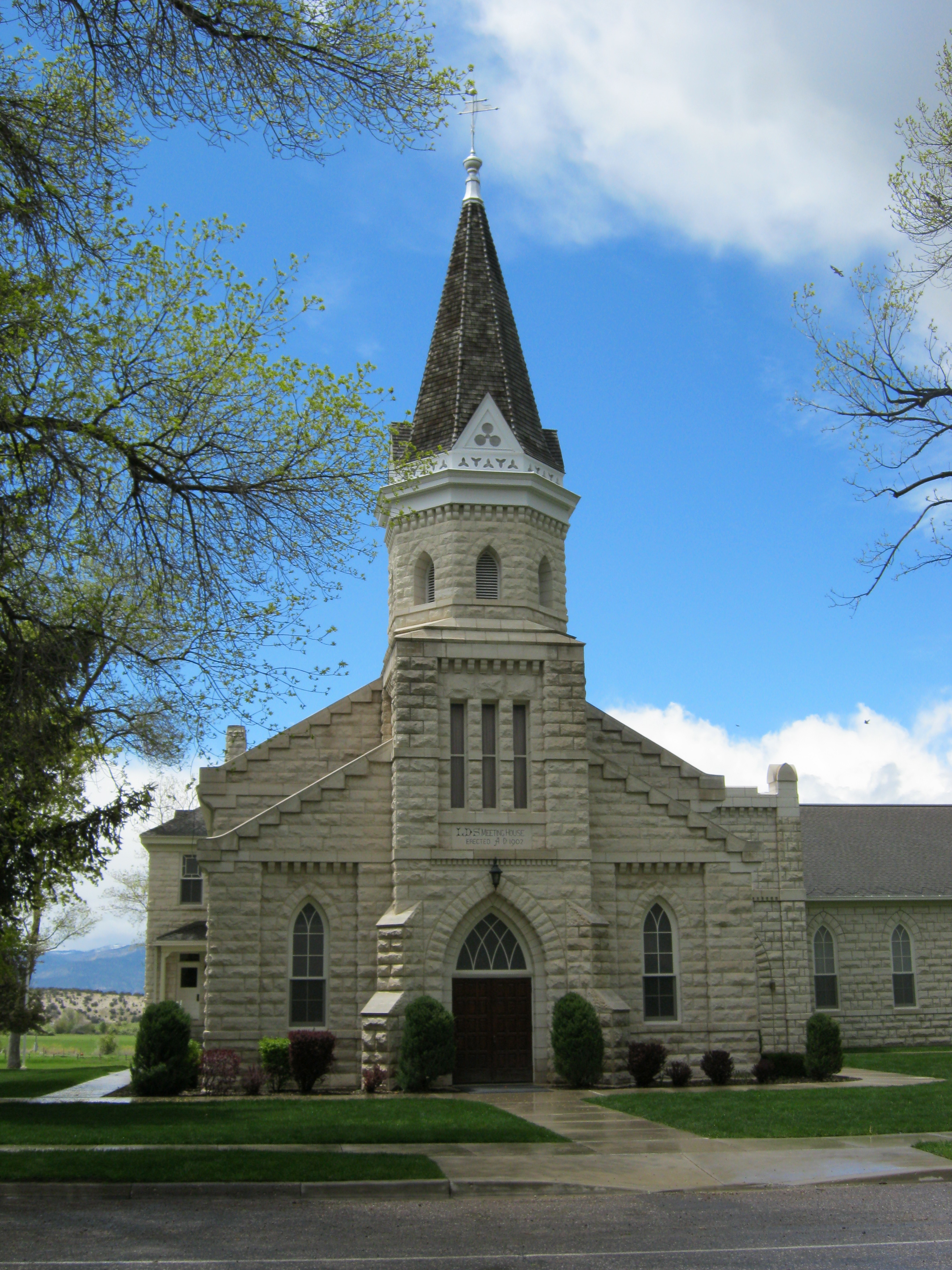
Spring City Chapel (1911)

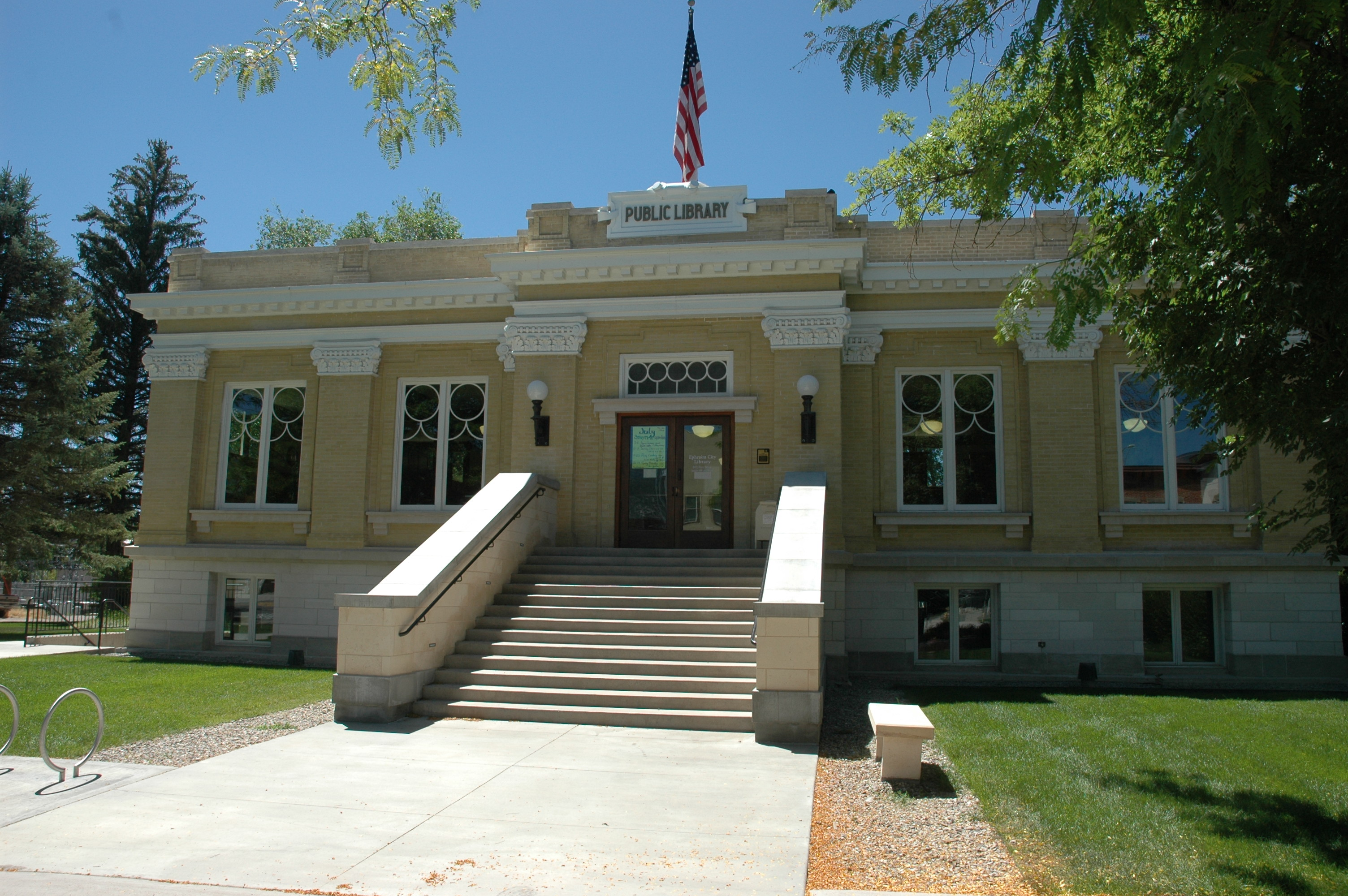
Ephraim Carnegie Library (1915)

=== Other existing buildings on National Register of Historic Places ===
- Eureka LDS Ward meetinghouse (1902) (Eureka Historic District)
- Harrington Elementary School (1903 section)
- First National Bank of Provo (1904) (Provo Historic District)
- Thomas N. Taylor House (1904)
- B.P.O.E. Block (1910) (Eureka Historic District)
- Manti Carnegie Library (1912), co-designed with John F. Birch
- Garland Carnegie Library (1914)
- Richmond Carnegie Library (1914)
- Winnemucca Grammar School (1928)

=== Demolished buildings ===
- Uintah County Courthouse (1900)
- Franklin Elementary School (1901)
- Brigham Young Academy: Training School (1902)
- Brigham Young Academy: Missionary Preparatory/Arts Building (1904)
- Price Commercial and Savings Bank (1910)
- Cedar City Carnegie Library (1914)
- Provo Carnegie Library (1914–1939; completely enclosed in 1939 addition)
- Roosevelt High School (1914)
- Midvale State Bank (1929)

=== Buildings where Watkins was possibly architect or contributor ===
- Reed Smoot House (1892)
- John Dixon House (1894)
- Hines Mansion (1895)
- Ira Hatch House
- John H. Seely House (1899)
- Washington School (1906)
