= John H. Seely House =

- John H. Seeley House
- U.S. National Register of Historic Places
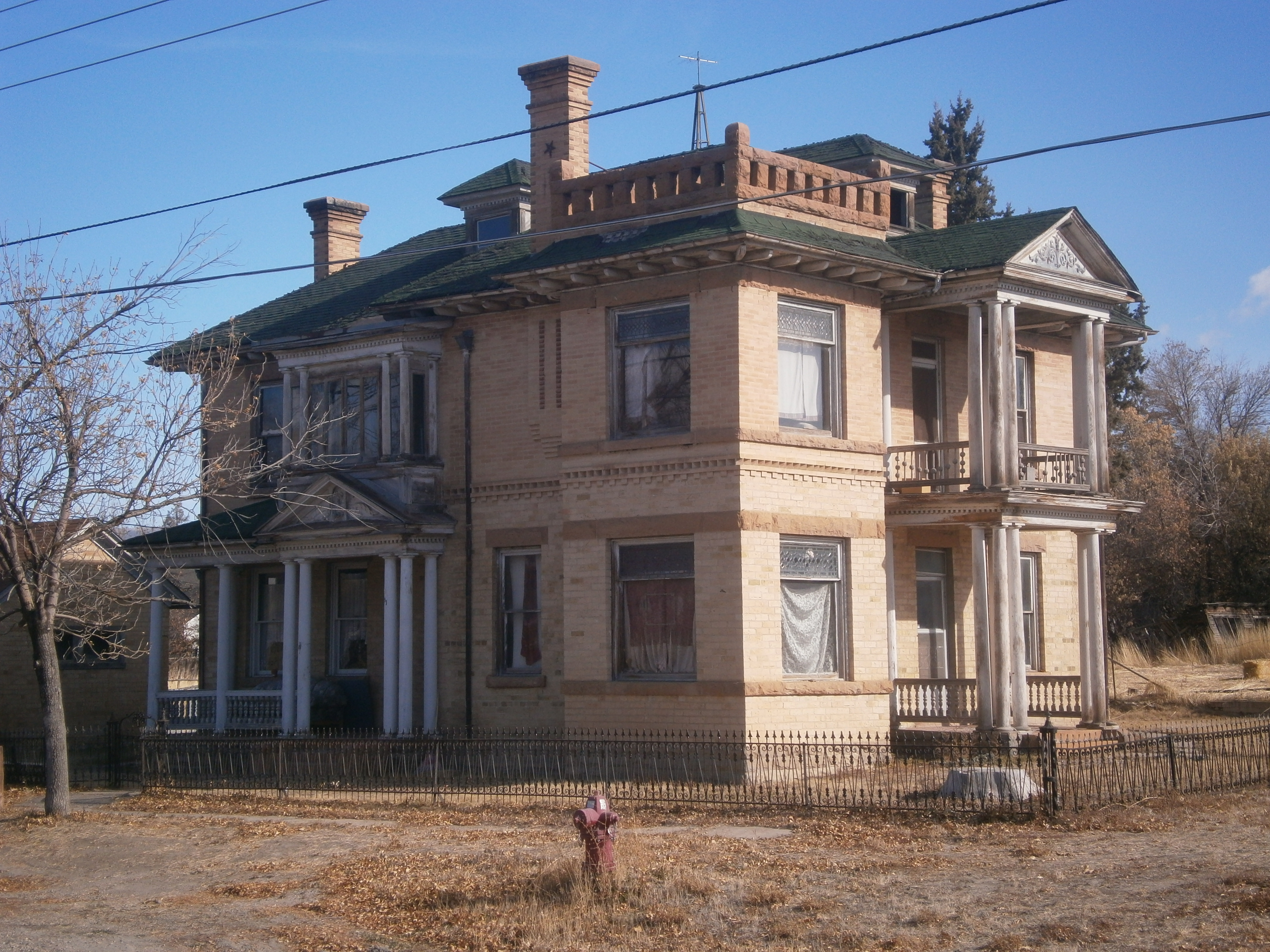

- Location within Utah Location within the United States
- Location: 150 S. State St., Mt. Pleasant, Utah
- Coordinates: 39°32′44″N 111°27′50″W
- Area: 1.5 acres (0.61 ha)
- Built: c.1870, 1887-90
- Architectural style: Victorian
- NRHP reference No.: 82004159
- Added to NRHP: March 9, 1982

The John H. Seely House, at 91 S. 5th West in Mount Pleasant, Utah, was listed on the National Register of Historic Places in 1982.

The existing house was mostly created in an extensive renovation, completed in 1890, of a smaller house built around 1870 by Jens C. Meiling. It is possible that the renovated house was designed by Richard C. Watkins.

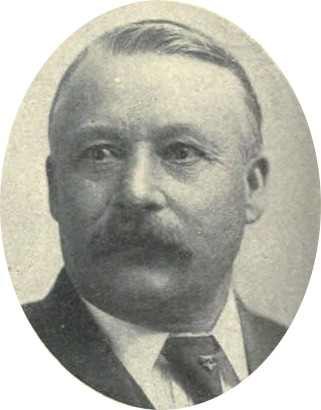
John H. Seely
