= Provo Third Ward Chapel and Amusement Hall =

- U.S. National Register of Historic Places
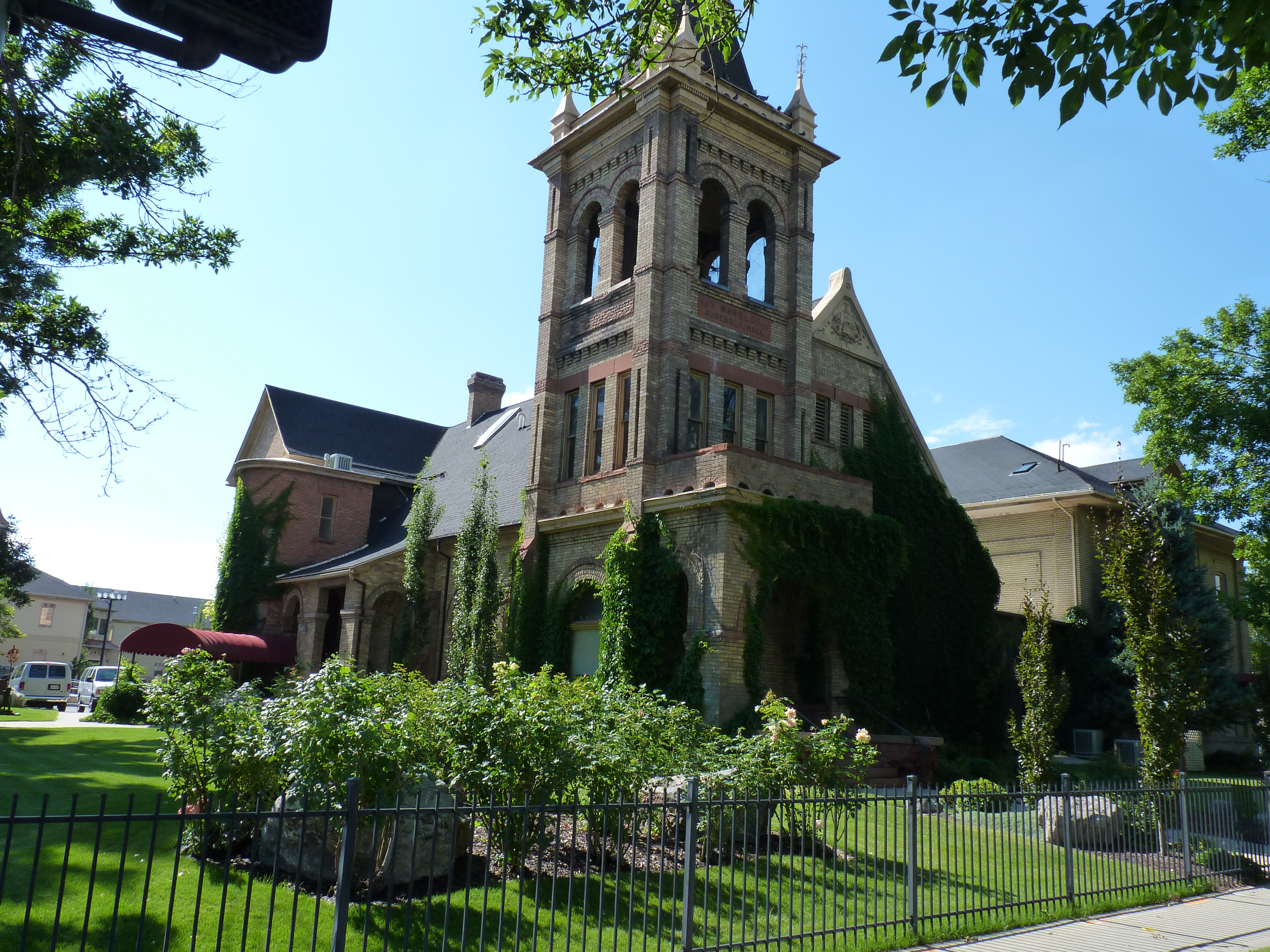
- Provo Third Ward Chapel

- Location within Utah Location within the United States
- Location: 105 North 500 West; Provo, Utah
- Coordinates: 40°14′8″N 111°40′1″W
- Area: 1 acre (0.40 ha)
- Built: 1903
- Architect: Richard C. Watkins
- Architectural style: Prairie School, Gothic
- NRHP reference No.: 79002518
- Added to NRHP: April 2, 1979

The Provo Third Ward Chapel is a historic building located in Provo, Utah. It was listed on the National Register of Historic Places on April 2, 1979. Construction started in 1901 and the building was originally a meetinghouse for the Church of Jesus Christ of Latter-day Saints until 1979, after which it went through several owners and changes including as a restaurant, dance club and private school. The Provo 3rd Ward Chapel was designated to the historic Provo Landmark register on April 28, 1995.

== Construction ==
Under the direction of Bishop Thomas N. Taylor, the Provo 3rd Ward chapel was completed in 1903, exemplifying one of the first English Parish Gothic churches in Utah. The building was designed by architect Richard C. Watkins, native of Provo. The cornerstone was laid in a ceremony on April 25, 1901. An adjoining amusement hall was built in 1913, and the entire interior was redone in the late 1930s under the direction of architect Fred L. Markham.

=== History ===
In 1901 the recently formed Provo Third Ward of the Utah Stake was responsible for the construction of a new chapel. Using primarily local materials and locally employed workers, Bishop Thomas N. Taylor, also the mayor of Provo, and his building committee composed of Arthur Dixon, Edgar Perry, and H. J. Maiben, undertook the project. The cost of the new building was $11,000 and it was completed in 1903. The chapel received an organ that had been used in the Provo Tabernacle in 1907. The adjoining amusement hall was added in 1913, but only the top floor was finished at an additional cost of $15,000. In 1926 the lower floor of the amusement hall was completed for an additional $5,600. The Provo Third Ward Chapel and Amusement Hall served not only as a chapel for worship, but also provided the Saints with a place to interact socially in forms of dance, musicals, sports, etc. During World War II the amusement hall was transformed to serve as army barracks for Army Specialized Training Units associated with Brigham Young University.

== Later use and ownership ==
The building was eventually vacated by the LDS Church in the year 1979 and sold. Subsequently, it has been used for various purposes including serving as the Ivy Tower dance club between 1989 and 1992. Other occupants included Scampi's restaurant and private academies.

From 1992 to 2021 it has been owned and operated by the Discovery Academy, a therapeutic boarding school. It was run by Dr. Eugene Thorne, a FLDS member and former BYU professor. Many allegations of child abuse, neglect, cruel and unusual punishment, isolation and solitary confinement of the students surfaced in recent years through the Breaking Code Silence Movement led by Paris Hilton and the docu-series The Program exposing how these facilities were set up. During this time this historical building was set up as a modern day prison, locking down children who had never been convicted through the court systems.

In 2022, Discovery Academy split into two organizations: Discovery Connections and Discovery Day. Discovery Day was a day treatment center for troubled youth that operated in the building and Discovery Connections operated in the school building next door to the west. Discovery Day closed its operations in 2023.

It was listed on the National Register of Historic Places in 1979.

== Notes ==
- National Park Service. "National Register of Historic Places Inventory -- Nomination Form." April 1995.
