= Knight House =

Knight House may refer to:

in the United States (by state then town)

- Ed Knight House, Pine Grove, Arkansas, listed on the National Register of Historic Places (NRHP) in Dallas County
- Knight-Wood House, Littleton, Colorado, listed on the NRHP in Arapahoe County
- William and Ruth Knight Lustron House, Atlanta, Georgia, listed on the NRHP in Fulton County
- Frobel-Knight-Borders House, Marietta, Georgia, listed on the NRHP in Cobb County
- Knight-Stout House, Finchville, Kentucky, listed on the NRHP in Shelby County
- Grant Knight House, Nicholasville, Kentucky, listed on the NRHP in Jessamine County
- J. B. Knight House, Hopkinsville, Kentucky, listed on the NRHP in Christian County
- Knight Cabin, Franklinton, Louisiana, listed on the NRHP in Washington Parish
- Knight-Corey House, Boothbay, Maine, listed on the NRHP in Lincoln County
- R. A. Knight-Eugene Lacount House, Somerville, Massachusetts, listed on the NRHP in Middlesex County
- Morris A. Knight House, Flint, Michigan, listed on the NRHP in Genesee County
- William Baker and Mary Knight House, Kansas City, Missouri, listed on the NRHP in Jackson County
- Knights-Morey House, Goshen, New Hampshire, listed on the NRHP in Sullivan County
- Collings-Knight Homestead, Collingswood, New Jersey, listed on the NRHP in Camden County
- Douglas M. and Grace Knight House, Durham, North Carolina
- Henry H. and Bettie S. Knight Farm, Knightdale, North Carolina, listed on the NRHP in Wake County
- Miller-Knight House, Miller, Ohio, listed on the NRHP in Lawrence County
- William Knight House, Canby, Oregon, listed on the NRHP in Clackamas County
- Knight Estate, Warwick, Rhode Island, listed on the NRHP in Kent County
- Webb S. Knight House, Spearfish, South Dakota, listed on the NRHP in Lawrence County
- Knight-Moran House, Franklin, Tennessee, listed on the NRHP in Williamson County
- Knight-Finch House, Orem, Utah, listed on the NRHP in Utah County
- Jesse Knight House, Provo, Utah, listed on the NRHP in Utah County
- Knight-Allen House, Provo, Utah, listed on the NRHP in Utah County
- Knight-Mangum House, Provo, Utah, listed on the NRHP in Utah County
- Hoag Gristmill and Knight House Complex, Starksboro, Vermont, listed on the NRHP in Addison County
- Godwin-Knight House, Chuckatuck, Virginia, listed on the NRHP in Suffolk
- Knight House (Spokane, Washington), listed on the National Register of Historic Places in Spokane County

== See also ==
- Knight Building (disambiguation)
