= Dr. Samuel H. Allen House and Carriage House =

Historic house in Utah, United States

- U.S. National Register of Historic Places
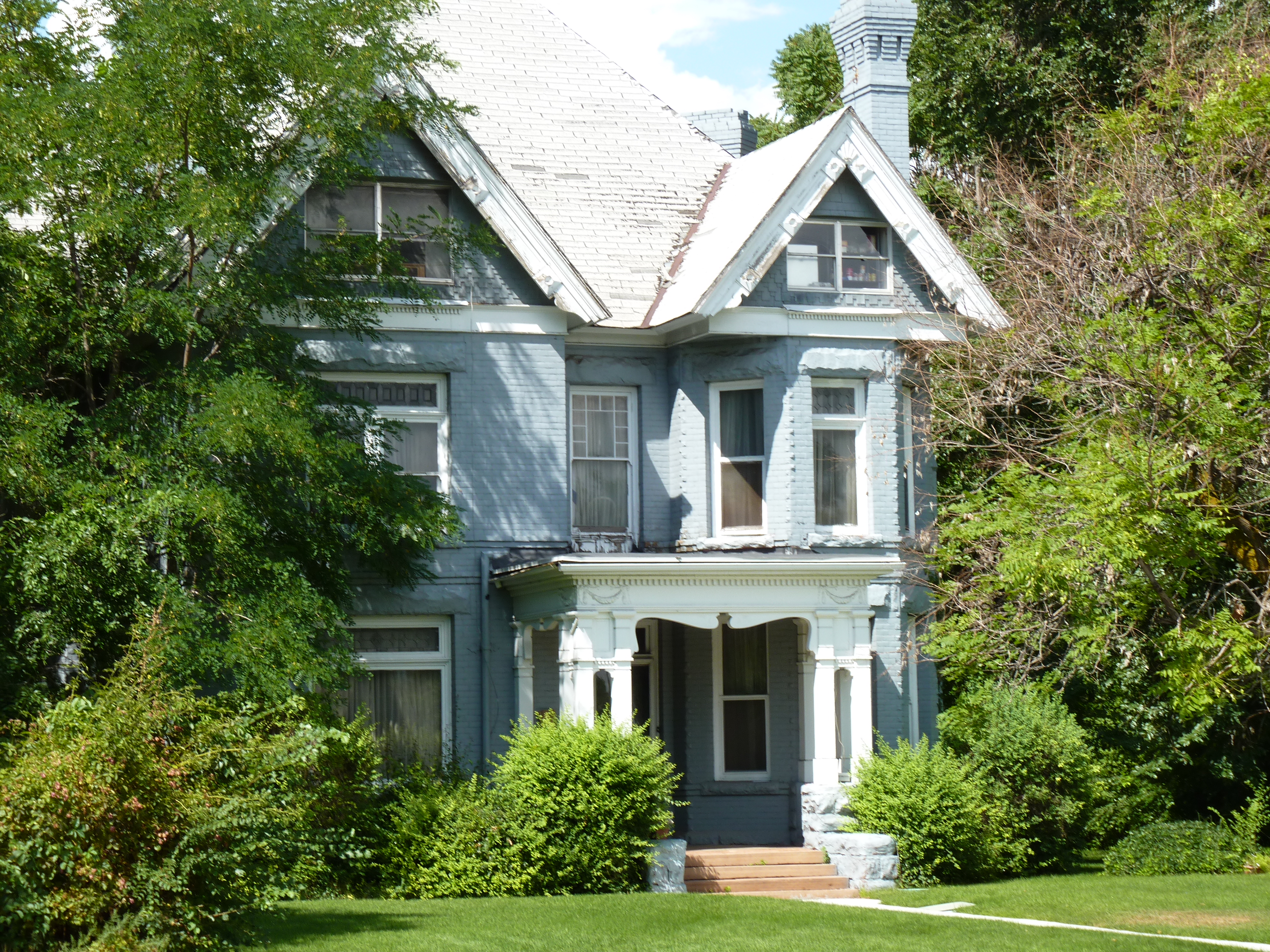
- Samuel H. Allen Home

- Location within Utah Location within the United States
- Location: 135 E. 200 North; Provo, Utah
- Coordinates: 40°14′12″N 111°39′19″W
- Area: less than one acre
- Built: 1897
- Architectural style: Late 19th and 20th Century Revivals, Queen Anne
- NRHP reference No.: 79002515
- Added to NRHP: May 18, 1979

The Samuel H. Allen Home is a historic house located at 135 E. 200 North in Provo, Utah. It is listed on the National Register of Historic Places.

== Description ==
According to its 1978 NRHP nomination, the home "is a good example of the architectural transition from the Queen Anne style to turn-of-the-century revival styles, which emphasized symmetry and classical detailing."

Except for wide, curved horizontal and vertical brackets, the porch is classically detailed. This is one of the tallest and largest historic houses in Provo, and its two-story carriage house may be the single largest building of its type. The heavy landscaping somewhat obscures the building's massiveness. The single-family dwelling has four major projections, each gabled, extending from the rusticated stone lintels, ornamental porch and bargeboards, polychrome color scheme, and combination of square and slanted bay wings. In good condition and relatively unaltered, the house is architecturally significant, as is the monitor-form carriage house, the lower level bays of which have been filled with windows.

== The Victorian Mansions of Provo ==
Built between the years 1893 and 1908 in Provo, Utah, this group of Victorian mansions is historically significant and represent not only fine architecture but some of the most successful men of the city and state at the time. These mansions include the Charles E. Loose House, the William H. Ray House, the Knight-Allen House, the John R. Twelves House, the Jesse Knight House, the Knight-Mangum House, and the Thomas N. Taylor House. All of these homes derive from the high style: Eastlake, Shingle, Craftsman, Italianate, Classical, Moorish, Colonial, and Romanesque Revivals. Made primarily of brick, these homes exhibit the finest architecture and most ornate detailing to be found in the city of Provo.

== History ==
Dr. Samuel H. Allen relocated to Provo in 1892 and built his beautiful home using local workers and materials. For a few years, he also ran his medical office out of his home, but the office was moved to the Knight block after it was built. In 1903 Samuel R. Thurman bought the home from Allen. S. R. Thurman had previously been mayor in the city of Lehi prior to moving to Provo in 1882.

In 1882, he was elected the youngest member of the Utah House of Representatives, a position to which he was privileged to return for several elections in a row. Thurman was also politically involved as a member of the Utah Constitutional Convention of 1882 and as a chairman of the committee that drafted the first part of the Provo People's Party in 1882. As national parties began to replace these local parties, Thurman, like many Mormons of that era, became a Democrat, as well as a judge on the Supreme Court of Utah. It was not long before Thurman sold the home to John W. Taylor.

John Taylor settled his third wife, Nellie Eva Todd, in this home, while his second wife, Nettie, lived at 287 East 200 North. John W. Taylor, the son of the third president of the LDS Church John Taylor, operated four farms in the area for income. In 1915, Taylor was excommunicated from the church, and his financial situation forced him to sell the home.

Taylor sold this house to Dr. David Westwood, who had become vice-president of the Provo General Hospital, Provo's first hospital. Westwood used part of the home as his office. Later, his son John T. Westwood, a dentist, and his family also lived in the home and shared an office (65 East 2nd North) with him. During the 1940s, the house was left vacant when the Westwoods moved away. In 1952, Monroe and Shirley Brockbank Paxman bought the home and raised their family of seven children there. Paxmans lived in the house until they died (2015 and 2017). In early 2022, the home was purchased by Paxmans’ grandson, Colin Foy, and his wife Megan. The Samuel H. Allen House was designated a historic Provo City landmark on April 28, 1995.

The house and the carriage house are listed as two contributing buildings in the NRHP nomination.

== See also ==
- History of the National Register of Historic Places
- United States National Register of Historic Places listings
