= Provo Downtown Historic District =

Historic district in Utah, United States

- U.S. National Register of Historic Places
- U.S. Historic district
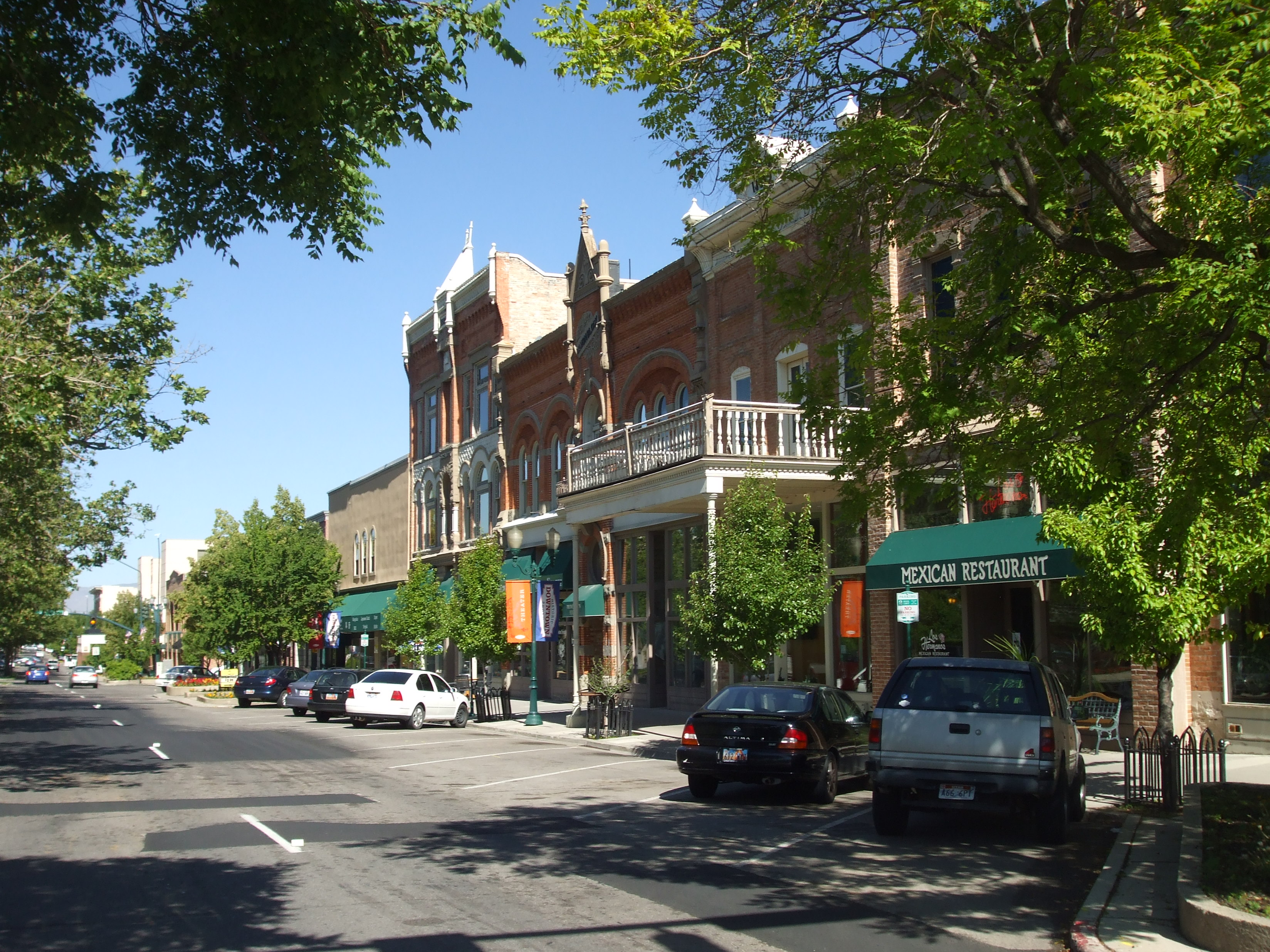
- Provo Downtown Historic District

- Location within Utah Location within the United States
- Location: Center Street and University Avenue; Provo, Utah
- Coordinates: 40°14′0″N 111°39′32″W
- Area: 25 acres (10 ha)
- Built: 1880-1970
- Architectural style: Classical Revival, Renaissance, Gothic Revival
- NRHP reference No.: 80003980
- Added to NRHP: May 1, 1980

The Provo Downtown Historic District is a 25-acre (10 ha) historic area located in Provo, Utah, United States. It is listed on the National Register of Historic Places.

The district is composed of four blocks of Center Street (100 East to 300 West) and one and a half blocks of University Avenue. The NRHP listing included 43 contributing buildings. The majority of the buildings in this district were built between 1880 and 1930, however there were buildings constructed all the way through the seventies. Many of the buildings, particularly the older ones, required some fashion of remodeling. Within the district, twenty structures are considered architecturally or historically significant, and twenty one structures are considered contributory.

== History ==
In the year 1849, a group of about 150 people arrived in and settled what is now the city of Provo. This group was sent by the president of the LDS church at the time, Brigham Young, for purposes of colonizing the area. The following year, the city was surveyed as a plot one square mile surrounded by several acres of land designated into eight lots. Brigham Young encouraged the settlers to build their homes and businesses in the proposed town site, and church leader George Albert Smith relocated to Provo to help encourage the city's development.

The first merchant of Provo, Andrew J. Stewart, owned and ran a store out of his home on 5th West. He eventually relocated his business to Center Street. By the end of 1852, two years after the arrival of the settlers, Provo had several operating businesses including a pottery, two grist mills, three cabinet shops, three shoe shops, one meat market, two lime kilns, one sash factory, one wooden bowl factory, two tailor's shops, two hotels, and two storehouses. The businesses dotted 5th West and Center Street.

Profits for merchants in Utah were fairly high during the 1860s. However, the farmers and LDS members who subsisted through agriculture did not receive much of a profit, if any, and began to resent the merchants for their success. Young instructed members to “Cease paying exorbitant prices demanded by disinterested persons...and hundreds of thousands of dollars may be saved annually by the saints". Young encouraged cooperative trading among the members of the church in order to ensure fair trade. The Provo West Co-op was the first cooperative store which was built, and it was built in the same building that Stewart operated and lived out of.

There was a large influx of buildings into Provo in the late 1860s. Many businesses came in and located along Center Street. These buildings were built primarily of wood or adobe. Commercial buildings that developed during this time included Provo's first kiln, W. Allen's brickyard, and the Provo West Co-op. The Liddiard Brothers, the sons of Samuel Giddiard, continued their father's cement business, contributing to many of the structures on Center Street. E. J. Ward and Sons, established in 1889, became a major competitor with the Beebe and Smooth Lumber Companies. The Provo Foundry and Machine company produced heat and plumbing still apparent in the town. The Taylor family established several successful businesses on the west side of the downtown, including the Taylor Furniture Company.

== Tintic Mining industry ==
The successful commercial mining of precious metals and minerals transformed Utah's economy from basically an agrarian base to a more industrialized state. Within this development, the Tintic Mining District, located approximately thirty miles southwest of Provo, was founded in 1869 and by 1899 became the leading mining center in Utah with a value of output placed at $5 million. A central figure in Tintic's success was Jesse Knight and the Knight family who resided in Provo. Knight attained wealth with his Humbug mine in the mid-1890s. The large silver producer allowed Knight to develop other mines in the East Tintic area. Knightsville grew around the workings and became touted as the only saloon-free, prostitute-free, privately owned mining camp in the U.S. His strict adherence to doctrines of the LDS church made the town one inhabited primarily by Mormons.

The Tintic mining effort had a large effect on Provo's commercial district. Jesse Knight, Charles E. Loose, and other entrepreneurs, made wealthy due to the mining industry, made Provo their home and set about to improving it. Loose spent his money buying up a large part of Provo's commercial property, such as the Loose Block. Knight established the Knight Block (bordering Center Street and University), in addition to the Knight Mansion.

Provo continued to grow. In 1883, construction began on a new LDS Tabernacle. In 1887, a chamber of commerce was organized. In 1889, the Rocky Mountain Bell Telephone Company developed and secured a twenty-year franchise. The Provo Lake Resort was also established on Utah Lake.

== Update ==
The district was listed on the National Register of Historic Places in 1980. The district includes the Knight Block, which was already separately listed on the National Register.

== See also ==
- National Register of Historic Places listings in Utah County, Utah
- Provo East Central Historic District
