= Knight Block =

- U.S. National Register of Historic Places
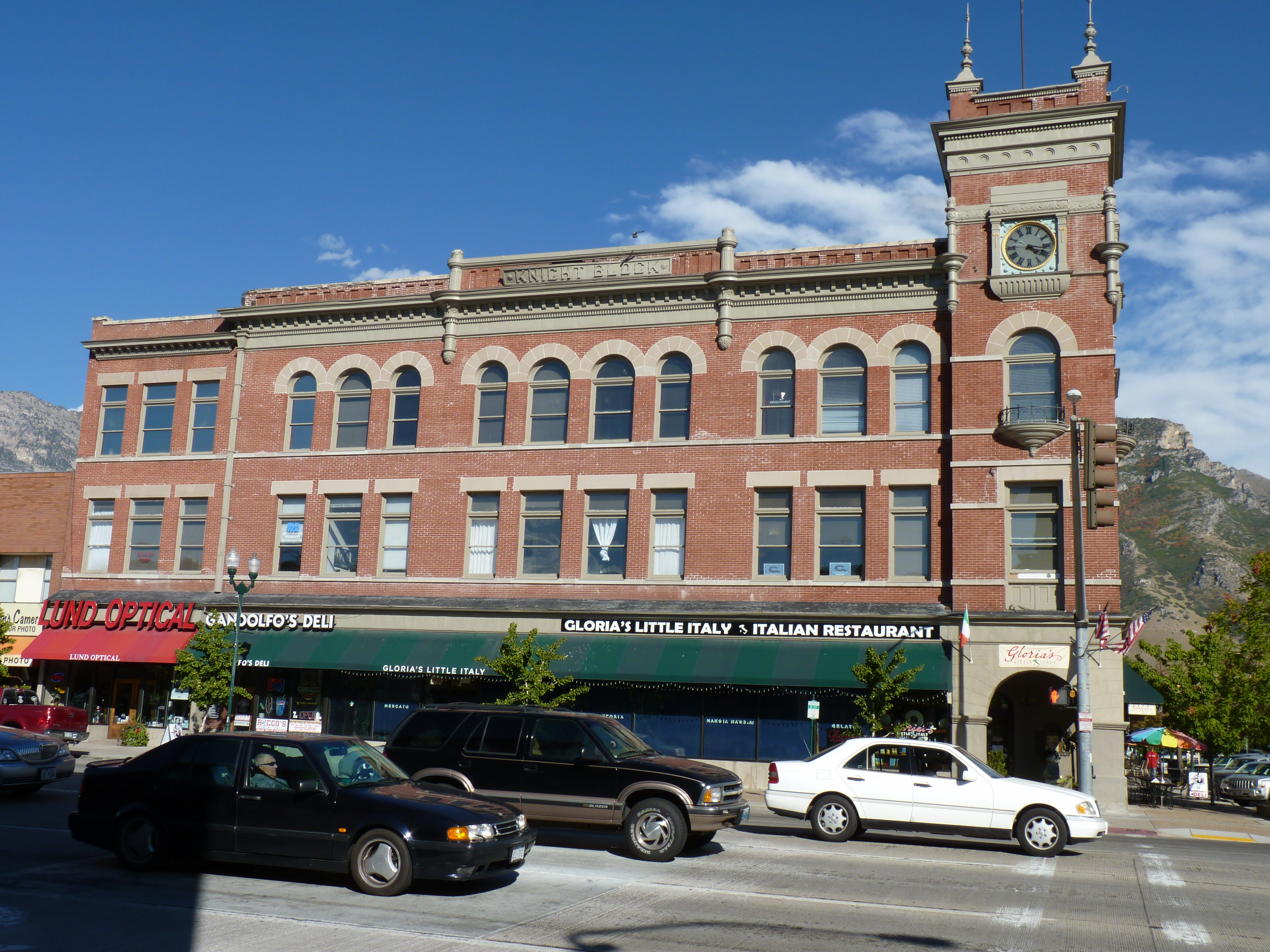
- Looking east at Knight Block, September 2011

- Location within Utah Location within the United States
- Location: 1-13 East Center Street and 20-24 North University Avenue; Provo, Utah
- Coordinates: 40°14′3″N 111°39′27″W
- Area: less than one acre
- Built: 1900
- Architect: Richard C. Watkins
- NRHP reference No.: 77001322
- Added to NRHP: December 2, 1977

The Knight Block is a historic building located on South University Avenue (U.S. Route 189) in downtown Provo, Utah, United States. It is listed on the National Register of Historic Places.

The Knight Block was constructed in 1900, and served as headquarters for Jesse Knight (1845-1921), a local businessman primarily in the mining industry.

It was designated to the National Register of Historic Places in May 1977.

== Structure ==
A three-story building, the Knight Block is a rectangular structure containing a ground floor for retail, a basement, and two upper floors used for offices. The structure is made of red brick with gray limestone lintels. On the southwest of the building is a clock tower which rises over the roof line of the building. Several additions have been made to the building, such as three bays built on the north end of the western face of the building and the inside of the main floor.

== Jessie Knight ==
Perhaps the wealthiest man in Provo at the time, Jesse Knight was born in 1845 in Nauvoo, Illinois. Knight's family migrated west, and reached Utah Territory in 1857. Twelve years later, Knight married Amanda McEwan and began a ranch in Payson, Utah. Following an impression that he had, Knight began a mining operation in the Eureka area and became rich. He subsequently bought other mines, founded a bank, purchased real estate in Provo, bought the Provo Woolen Mills, and started farming and cattle interests in Canada. Throughout all of these efforts, Knight remained an active supporter of the Church of Jesus Christ of Latter-day Saints (LDS Church), and his mines were called the "cleanest mining camps in the west" (Utah State Historical Society p. 2). Knight died in 1921, designating much of his amassed fortune to Brigham Young University and various other institutions.

== Jesse Knight and the Tintic Mining Industry ==
The successful commercial mining of precious metals and minerals transformed Utah's economy from basically an agrarian base to a more industrialized state. Within this development the Tintic Mining District, located approximately thirty miles southwest of Provo, was founded in 1869 and by 1899 became the leading mining center in Utah with a value of output placed at five million dollars. A central figure in Tintic success was Jesse Knight and the Knight family who resided in Provo. Knight attained wealth with his Humbug mine in the mid-1890s. The large silver producer allowed Knight to develop other mines in the East Tintic area. Knightsville grew around the workings and became touted as the only saloon-free, prostitute-free, privately owned mining camp in the U.S. His strict adherence to doctrines of the LDS Church made the town one inhabited primarily by Mormons.

Knight was able to expand farther than the tintic mines, reaching to the power plant in Santaquin, the Knight Dry Farm, and the smelters at Silver City. The Bonneville Mining Company, the Knight Woolen Mills, Ellison Ranching Company, the American-Columbian Corporation, the Springville-Mapleton Sugar Company, the Spring Canyon Coal Company, Utah Savings Bank, the Layton Sugar Company, and the Tintic Drain Tunnel Company all represent facets of the Knight Investment Company. The fortune Knight earned from these investments allowed the construction of not only the Knight Block, but also the Knight-Mangum House, the Knight-Allen House, and the Jesse Knight House.

== See also ==
- National Register of Historic Places listings in Utah County, Utah
