= Knight Building =

Knight Building may refer to:

- W. A. Knight Building, Jacksonville, Florida
- Joe Knight Building, Lebanon, Missouri, listed on the National Register of Historic Places
- F. M. Knight Building, Portland, Oregon
- Jesse Knight Building, Brigham Young University, Provo, Utah
- Knight Block, Center Street and University Avenue, Provo, Utah

== See also ==
- Knight House (disambiguation)
