= John R. Twelves House =

Historic house in Utah, United States

- U.S. National Register of Historic Places
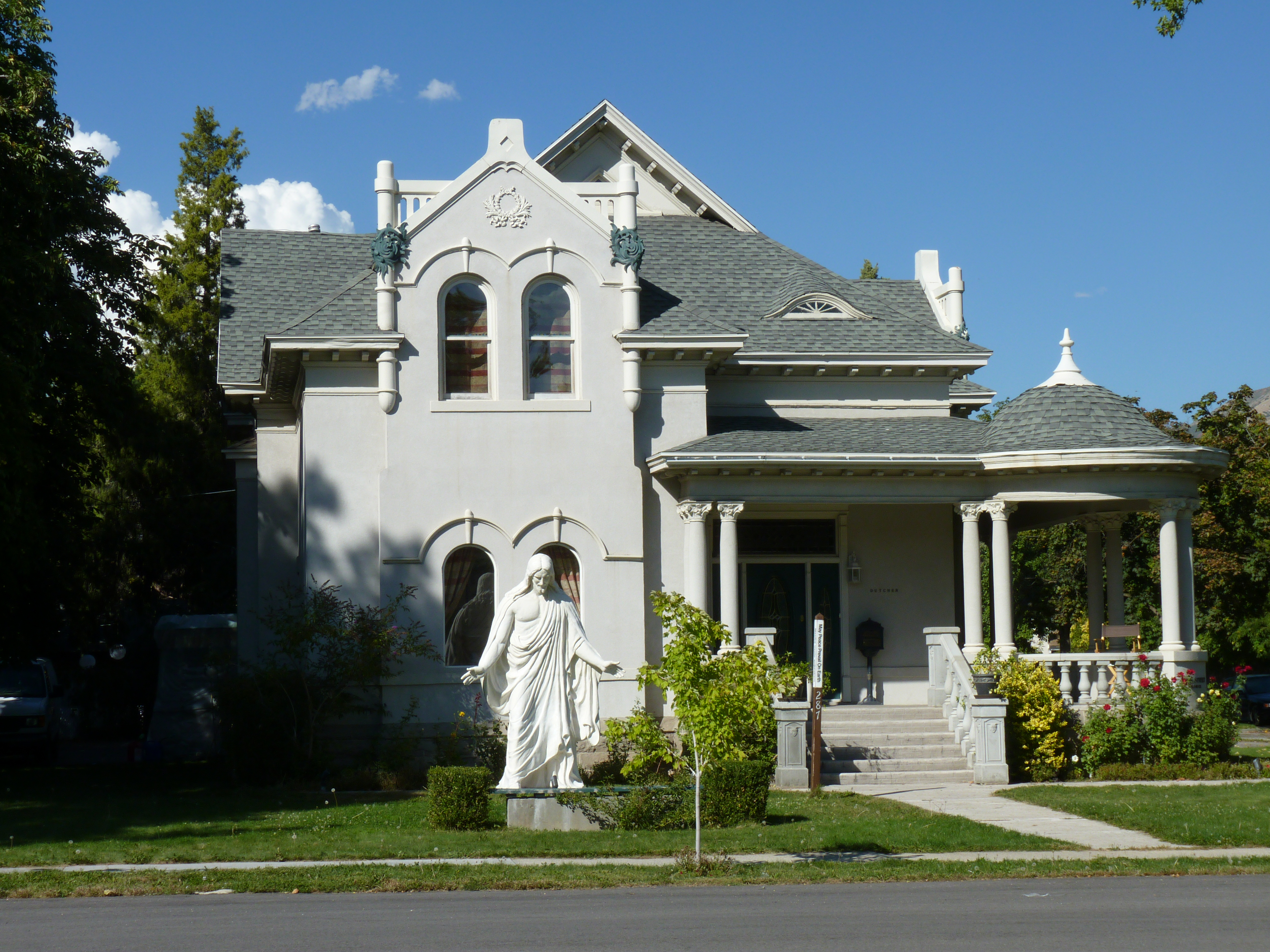

- Location within Utah Location within the United States
- Location: 287 East 100 North, Provo, Utah
- Coordinates: 40°14′7″N 111°39′10″W
- Area: less than one acre
- Built: 1906
- Architect: John R. Twelves
- Architectural style: Romanesque, Victorian Eclectic
- MPS: Entrepreneurial Residences of Turn-of-the-Century Provo TR
- NRHP reference No.: 82004181
- Added to NRHP: July 23, 1982

The John R. Twelves House is a historic house located in Provo, Utah, United States. It is listed on the National Register of Historic Places.

== John R. Twelves House ==
This home, located at 287 East 100 North, was built in 1906 by John R. Twelves. John R. Twelves was a central figure in Utah's history, being involved in the Grand Central Mining Company and serving as Utah County's treasurer and recorder. The John R. Twelves House was designated to the Provo City Historic Landmarks Registry on April 26, 1996.

Starting in 1911 this was the residence of George H. Brimhall the president of Brigham Young University at the time.

Since 2005, the Twelves House has been the home of independent filmmaker Richard Dutcher's Main Street Movie Company, a motion picture production and distribution company. The 9 foot marble sculpture of Jesus, which dominates the front lawn, is a prop which plays prominently in Dutcher's film Falling.

=== The Victorian Mansions of Provo ===
"Constructed between 1893 and 1908 in Provo, Utah, these Victorian mansions reflect the wealth and personality of Utah's most successful entrepreneurs of the time. These mansions include the Charles E. Loose House, the William H. Ray House, the Knight-Allen House, the John R. Twelves House, the Jesse Knight House, the Knight-Mangum House, and the Thomas N. Taylor House. "Built during the turn of the century from 1893 to 1908, the domestic residences of Provo's prominent entrepreneurs reflect the wealth, power, and aesthetic taste of their owners and of America's Gilded Age. Larger in size, more complicated in their massing, and ornate in their detailing than the typical residences of Provo, these houses are the Victorian mansions of the city. All derive from the high style popular at the end of the nineteenth century: Eastlake, Italianate, Shingle, Craftsman, Moorish, and the Classical, Romanesque and Colonial Revivals. Although the high styles are of a purer form in these houses than is usually found in Provo, an eclectic attitude still dominates with several styles often being combined into one residence. Characteristic of all these buildings is a compactness and a low earth-hugging quality, which is typical of Provo's architecture but antithetical to the optimistic verticality of Salt Lake's Victorian buildings. As is true of the majority of Provo's residences, these houses are made primarily of brick, including elaborate ornamental coursing and trim. The Victorian fascination with a variety of rich materials is visible only in the use of masonry in the foundations, lintels and arches of these buildings and in the extensive use of leaded and stained glass in the windows. Some of the most ornate fenestration to be found in Provo is contained in these buildings. In comparison to the buildings in Salt Lake City, these Victorian mansions are modest in size, style, and materials, but are more reflective of the high styles than those generally found in Utah's small towns such as Manti or Spring City (National Register of Historic Places Inventory—Nomination Form)."

=== Jesse Knight and The Tintic Mining Industry ===
The successful commercial mining of precious metals and minerals transformed Utah's economy from basically an agrarian base to a more industrialized state. Within this development the Tintic Mining District, located approximately thirty miles southwest of Provo, was founded in 1869 and by 1899 became the leading mining center in Utah with a value of output placed at $5 million. A central figure in Tintic success was Jesse Knight and the Knight family who resided in Provo. Jesse Knight attained wealth with his Humbug mine in the mid-1890s. The large silver producer allowed Knight to develop other mines in the East Tintic area. Knightsville grew around the workings and became touted as the only saloon-free, prostitute-free, privately owned mining camp in the U.S. His strict adherence to doctrines of The Church of Jesus Christ of Latter-day Saints made the town one inhabited primarily by members of that church. "Knight began to expand and diversify as mining in Tintic burgeoned. The Knight smelters at Silver City, power plant in Santaquin Canyon, Narrow gauge railway circumventing the district, Tintic drain tunnel projet, and the Knight dry farm all represented vast investments and profits (National Register of Historic Places Inventory—Nomination Form)."

"With financial success Knight expanded with the result of securing coordination of his holdings and placing responsibility on family members by organizing the Knight Investment Company. This corporation included the Bonneville Mining company, Knight Woolen Mills (located in Provo), Ellison Ranching Company (Nevada), Spring Canyon Coal Company (Carbon County, Utah), and Savings Bank (Provo), Layton Sugar Company, American-Columbian Corporation, Springville-Mapleton Sugar Company, and the Tintic Drain Tunnel Company (National Register of Historic Places Inventory—Nomination Form)." John R. Twelves acquired a large amount of wealth from the mining business as well. As secretary-treasurer of the Grand Central Mining Company Twelves prospered as the stock for Grand Central rose. In 1902, Twelves had attained enough money to fund his home.

=== Preservation ===
The house was listed on the National Register of Historic Places in 1982 as part of a multiple property submission that nominated seven and listed six Provo houses. The listed houses are the Knight-Mangum House, this, the John R. Twelves House, the Jesse Knight House, the Knight-Allen House, the William H. Ray House, and the Thomas N. Taylor House. The seventh, the Charles E. Loose House, was determined to be NRHP-eligible but was not NRHP-listed due to owner objection.
