= Provo East Central Historic District =

Historic district in Utah, United States

- U.S. National Register of Historic Places
- U.S. Historic district
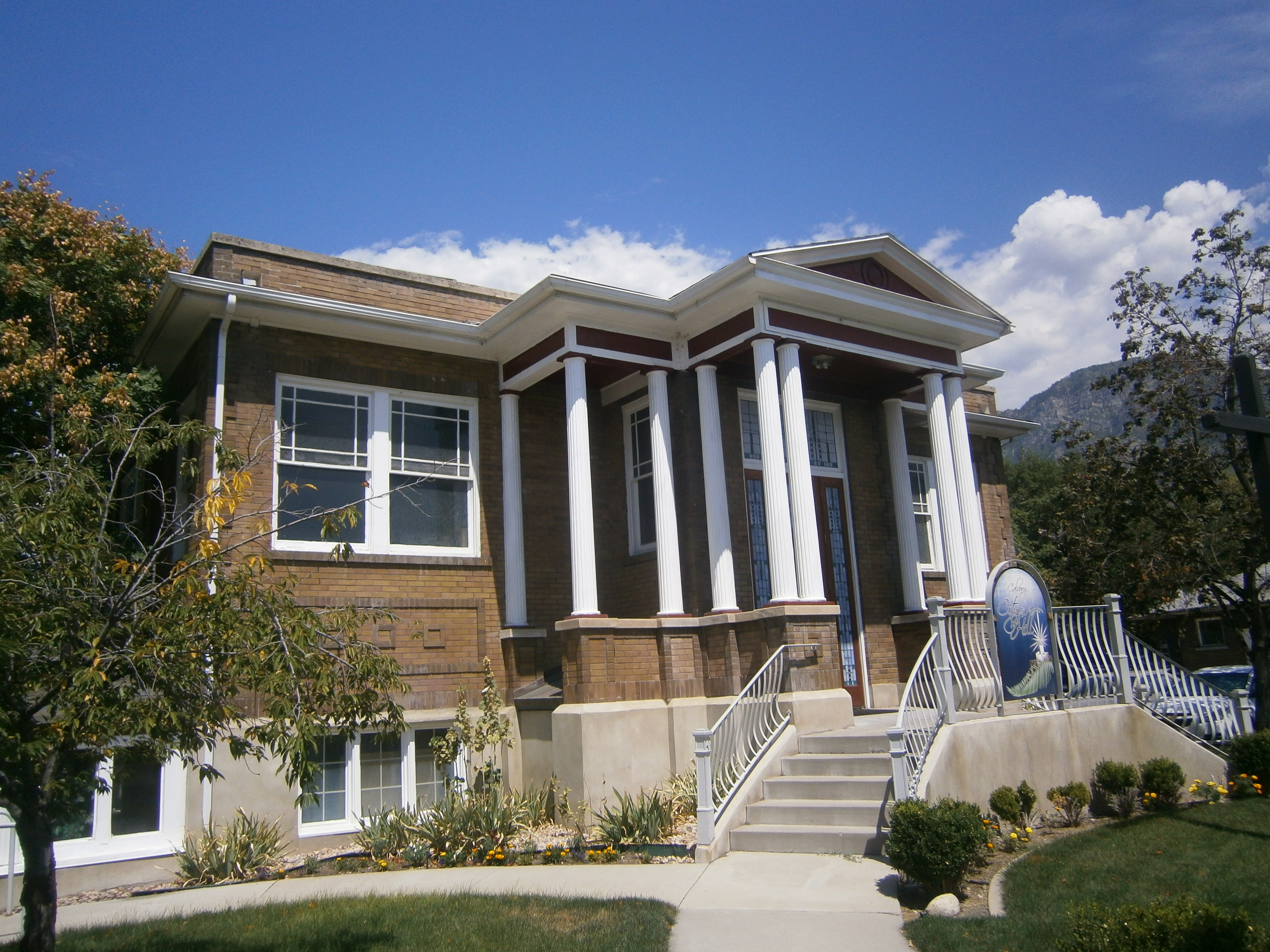
- This historic church building is a contributing property in the district.

- Location within Utah Location within the United States
- Location: Roughly bounded by 100 East, 600 East, 500 North and 500 South; Provo, Utah; United States
- Area: 260 acres (110 ha)
- Architectural style: Bungalow/Craftsman, Prairie School, Late Victorian
- NRHP reference No.: 98000281 (original); 100012832 (increase)

Significant dates
- Added to NRHP: November 24, 1998
- Boundary increase: March 19, 2026

The Provo East Central Historic District is a historic district in Provo, Utah, United States that was listed on the National Register of Historic Places in 1998 and enlarged in 2026.

== Description ==
The district, when first listed in 1998, was roughly bounded by 100 East, 500 North, 600 East, and 500 South and includes examples of Bungalow/Craftsman, Prairie School, and Late Victorian architecture among its 599 contributing buildings. The majority of its buildings were constructed between 1900 and 1925.

The Charles E. Loose House is a contributing property in the district.

== See also ==
- National Register of Historic Places listings in Utah County, Utah
- Provo Downtown Historic District
