= Yankee Headframe =

- U.S. National Register of Historic Places
- Location within Utah Location within the United States
- Nearest city: Eureka, Utah
- Coordinates: 39°56′52″N 112°5′49″W
- Area: less than one acre
- MPS: Tintic Mining District MRA
- NRHP reference No.: 79003484
- Added to NRHP: March 14, 1979

The Yankee Headframe is a mine headframe near Eureka, Utah that was listed on the National Register of Historic Places in 1979.

The Yankee Consolidated mine was part of the Tintic Mining District in the 1890s, in which Jesse Knight achieved riches. It was later owned by Anaconda Copper.
