= Charles E. Loose House =

Historic house in Utah, United States

- U.S. Historic district – Contributing property
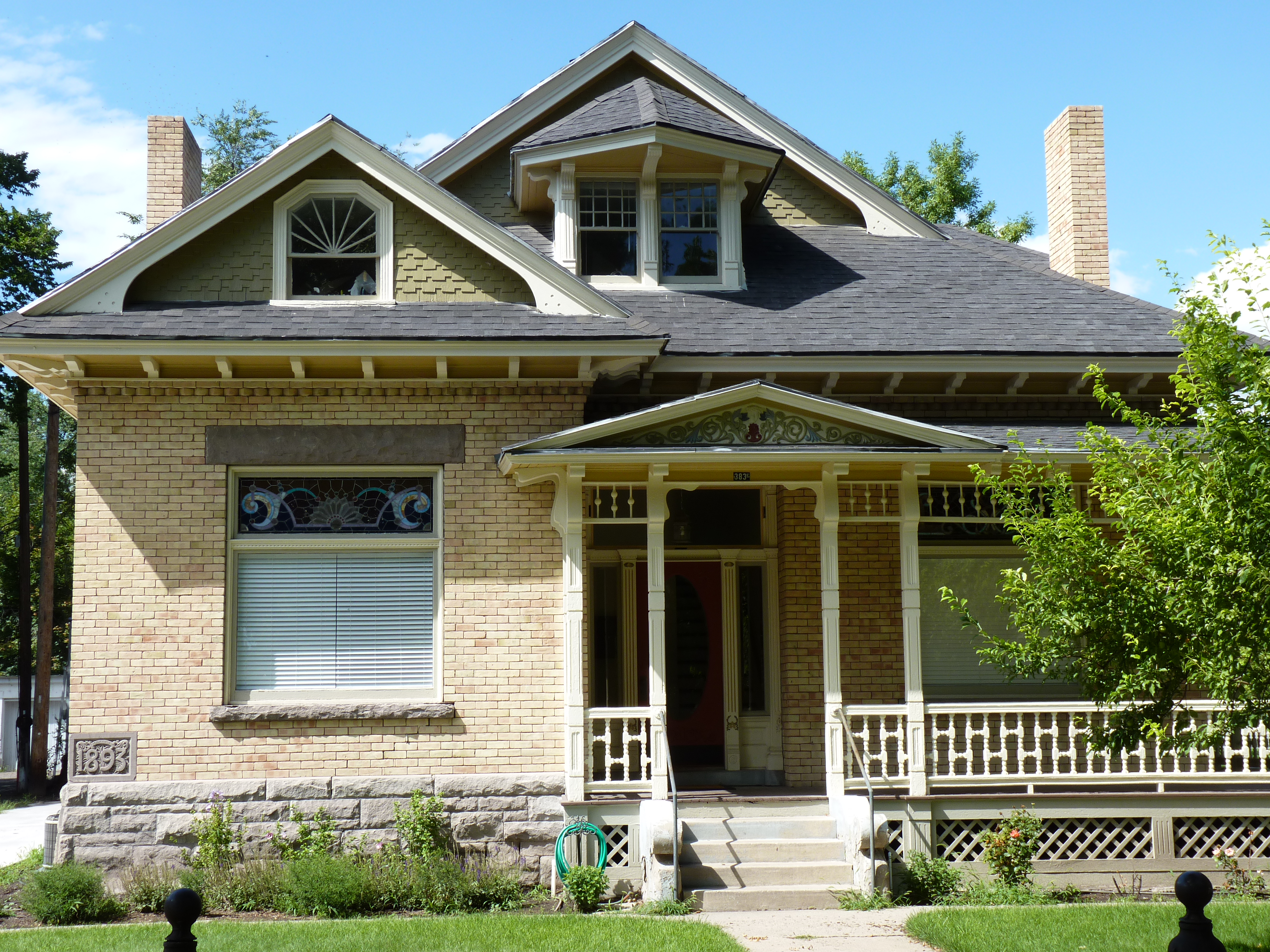

- Location within Utah Location within the United States
- Location: 383 E. Two Hundred South; Provo, Utah
- Coordinates: 40.2313°N 111.6521°W
- Area: less than one acre
- Built: 1893
- Architectural style: Stick/Eastlake
- Part of: Provo East Central Historic District (ID98000281)
- MPS: Entrepreneurial Residences of Turn-of-the-Century Provo TR
- Designated CP: November 24, 1998

The Charles E. Loose House is a historic house located in Provo, Utah, United States. The house was individually nominated for listing on the National Register of Historic Places in 1982 but was not listed due to owner objection. It later was included as a contributing property in the Provo East Central Historic District.

== Description ==
Built in 1893 by Charles E. Loose, the Charles E. Loose House (383 E 200 S) "Combines the massing of the Shingle Style with a consistent program of Eastlake ornamentation. Its enveloping roof, veranda and pentagonal fanlight gable windows mark its individuality among the city's architectural sites (Historic Provo p. 24)." The Charles E. Loose House was designated a historic Provo City Landmark on April 28, 1995.

=== The Victorian Mansions of Provo ===
Built between the years 1893 and 1908 in Prov, this group of Victorian mansions are historically significant and represent not only fine architecture but some of the most successful men of the city and state at the time. These mansions include the Charles E. Loose House, the William H. Ray House, the Knight-Allen House, the John R. Twelves House, the Jesse Knight House, the Knight-Mangum House, and the Thomas N. Taylor House. All of these homes derive from the high style: Eastlake, Shingle, Craftsman, Italianate, Classical, Moorish, Colonial, and Romanesque Revival. Made primarily of brick, these homes exhibit the finest architecture and most ornate detailing to be found in the city of Provo.

=== Charles E. Loose ===
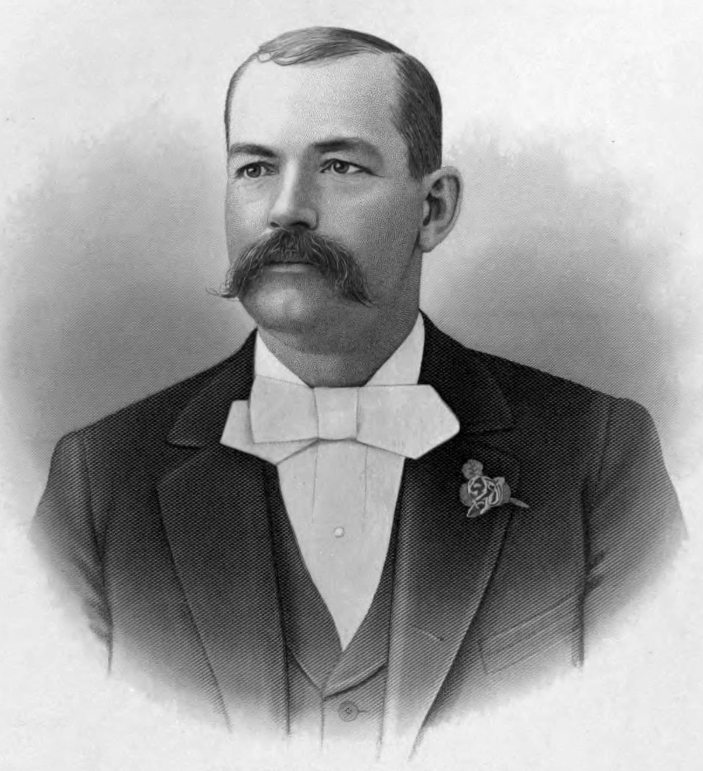
Charles E. Loose

Charles E. Loose (1853–1929) was a banker and a Utah State Senator. Charles was linked to Provo as a central entrepreneur during the period of time when Provo's economy transformed from primarily agrarian to that of commercial mining. Charles E. Loose was a non-Mormon, as opposed to many of the other primary entrepreneurs made wealthy by the Tintic Mining District, and probably the most prominent in Provo at the turn of the century. As Grand Central stock rose, so did Charles Loose. By 1900 the company had installed a new surface plant, including an innovative all steel headframe over its shaft—a first and only in the entire area. Thus, Loose built his Provo residence in 1893.

=== Jesse Knight and The Tintic Mining Industry ===
The successful commercial mining of precious metals and minerals transformed Utah's economy from basically an agrarian base to a more industrialized state. Within this development the Tintic Mining District, located approximately 30 miles (48 km) southwest of Provo, was founded in 1869 and by 1899 became the leading mining center in Utah with a value of output placed at five million dollars. A central figure in Tintic success was Jesse Knight and the Knight family who resided in Provo. Jesse Knight attained wealth with his Humbug mine in the mid-1890s. The large silver producer allowed Knight to develop other mines in the East Tintic area. Knightsville grew around the workings and became touted as the only saloon-free, prostitute-free, privately owned mining camp in the United States. His strict adherence to doctrines of the Church of Jesus Christ of Latter-day Saints made the town one inhabited primarily by Latter-day Saints. Jessie Knight was able to expand farther than the tintic mines, reaching to the power plant in Santaquin, the Tintic drain tunnel project, the Knight Dry farm, and the smelters at Silver City. The Bonneville Mining company, the Knight Woolen Mills, Ellison Ranching Company, The American-Columbian Corporation, The Springville-Mapleton Sugar Company, The Spring Canyon Coal Company, Utah Savings Bank, The Layton Sugar Company, and the Tintic Drain Tunnel Company all represent facets of the Knight Investment Company. The success resulting from the Tintic Mining District provided the means for Charles E. Loose to acquire the wealth evident from his residence. In fact, Loose was involved in the Grand Central Mining Company as a manager.

=== Preservation ===
The house was nominated on the National Register of Historic Places in 1982 as part of a multiple property submission that nominated seven and listed six Provo houses. The listed houses are the Knight-Mangum House, the John R. Twelves House, the Jesse Knight House, the Knight-Allen House, the William H. Ray House, and the Thomas N. Taylor House. This house, the Charles E. Loose House, was determined to be eligible for the National Register, but it was not listed due to an objection by the owner.

== See also ==
- National Register of Historic Places listings in Utah County, Utah
