= Provo West Co-op =

- U.S. National Register of Historic Places
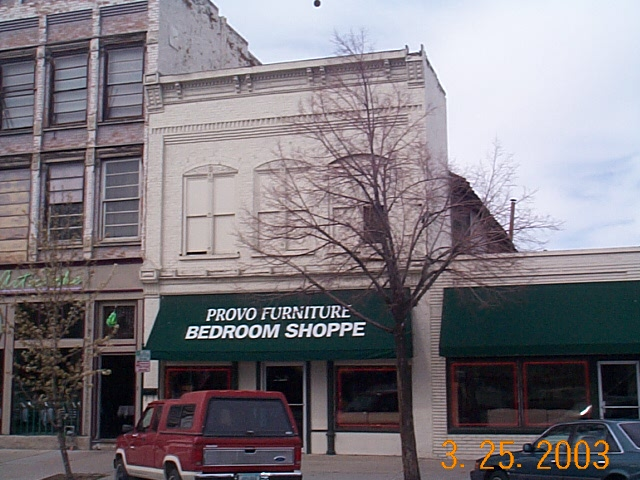
- Provo West Co-op

- Location within Utah Location within the United States
- Location: 466 West Center Street; Provo, Utah
- Coordinates: 40°14′3″N 111°39′56″W
- Area: less than one acre
- Built: c.1866, c.1890
- Architectural style: Early Commercial
- NRHP reference No.: 84002429
- Added to NRHP: July 13, 1984

The Provo West Co-op is a mercantile institution and also the name of its historic building in Provo, Utah. The Early Commercial-style building was listed on the National Register of Historic Places in 1984 as "Provo West Co-op".

== Provo West Cooperative Mercantile Institution ==
Built to encourage trading among the Latter Day Saints, the Provo West Co-op was one of the first stores built in the city under the cooperative merchandising movement sponsored by the Church of Jesus Christ of Latter-day Saints of the late 1800s. Provo West Co-op was designated to the Provo City Historic Landmarks Registry on March 21, 1996.

== Cooperative Trading ==
The City of Provo was settled by members of the LDS church in the year 1849. At this time, the members of the town subsisted primarily through agriculture. Most material goods were transported from Salt Lake City to Provo, where they were exchanged for food. In 1853, Andrew J. Stewart opened Provo's first store inside of his home. In 1869, the store that he later built on Center Street in the City of Provo became the Provo West Co-op.

Profits for merchants in Utah were doing fairly high at this time during the 1860s. However, the farmers and the LDS church, who subsisted through agriculture did not receive much of a profit, if any. Subsequently, they began to resent the merchants for their success. Brigham Young, President of the LDS church at that time instructed members to "Cease paying exorbitant prices demanded by disinterested persons...and hundreds of thousands of dollars may be saved annually by the saints." In an attempt to lower the price of flour for the saints, the Utah Produce Co. was organized under church leadership. It was hoped that the produce company would be able to secure all of the grain in the area, and then control the price of flour by monopoly. The effort did not last long and eventually failed. With the railroad on its way toward Utah, many members of The Church of Jesus Christ of Latter Day Saints, feared that the situation would only be made worse, with more outsiders making even greater profits off of the Mormons.

== History ==
Samuel S. Jones and David John were the first to take action towards building a cooperative trading store. In December 1868, plans were drawn up for the store. Subscriptions at the time of the meeting amounted to $5,000 at the time, and by the end of the month totalled $17,000. The original place and merchandise for the new Cooperative store was purchased from H.W. Lawrence, who sold his goods at cost ($22,880.34), and his building worth $10,400 for $10,000. This store eventually became known as the “East Co-op.”

It was then proposed that the women of the Relief Society (The women's organization within the LDS church) take a part in the cooperative system. The women agreed, and on March 24, 1869, they held a meeting to discuss how they might best assist the program. Although originally they had thought to build four stores, one for each ward in Provo, during the meeting they agreed that they would begin with one until sufficient capital was gained to expand. They purchased the building built in 1869 by Andrew Stewart on Center Street, and Samuel S. Jones was made manager. Although originally referred to as the “Female Store” and the “Women’s Co-op,” the store eventually became known as the “West Co-op.”

After the completion of the Cooperative trading system in Provo, Brigham Young was able to convince Salt Lake city merchants to cooperate with the system. As a result, the Zion's Cooperative Mercantile Institution (Z.C.M.I.) was put into operation, and goods were able to be purchased there and sold from the Provo Stores.

=== Success ===
Both the East and West Cooperative Mercantile Institutions experienced financial success. The West more so than the East, as its goods were purchased at a lower rate due to them being transported on the railroad. After approximately three months of running, profits totalled $254.15. Dividends paid out were between twenty and thirty percent.

Wanting to follow in these store's footsteps, more new cooperatives were developed in Provo, such as the Cooperative Boot and Shoe Store, Pottery, Woolen Mills, Meat Market, Grist Mill, Bricks, Stock-herd, Drug Store, and a Clothing and Tailoring Store.

=== Structure ===
The building is Early Commercial in style. It is a two-story flat-roofed building with a brick exterior. The interior core, of wood and adobe was built around 1866. Its brick exterior was added around 1890 by the Provo West Co-op before it went out of business.

A two-story painted brick building, the Provo West Co-op is in relatively good condition today. The inside of the Co-op consists of wood and adobe. One bay deep and three bays wide, Tuscan columns built on pedestals surround the entryway, and the Victorian Eclectic style detail is evident in the double hung sash windows on the second floor. Dentils and consoles are symmetrically aligned on the cornice. Although changes have been made and the building does not retain its original integrity, it still preserves much of the character of the buildings of the late 1800s.
