= Morris A. Knight House =

- U.S. National Register of Historic Places
- Michigan State Historic Site
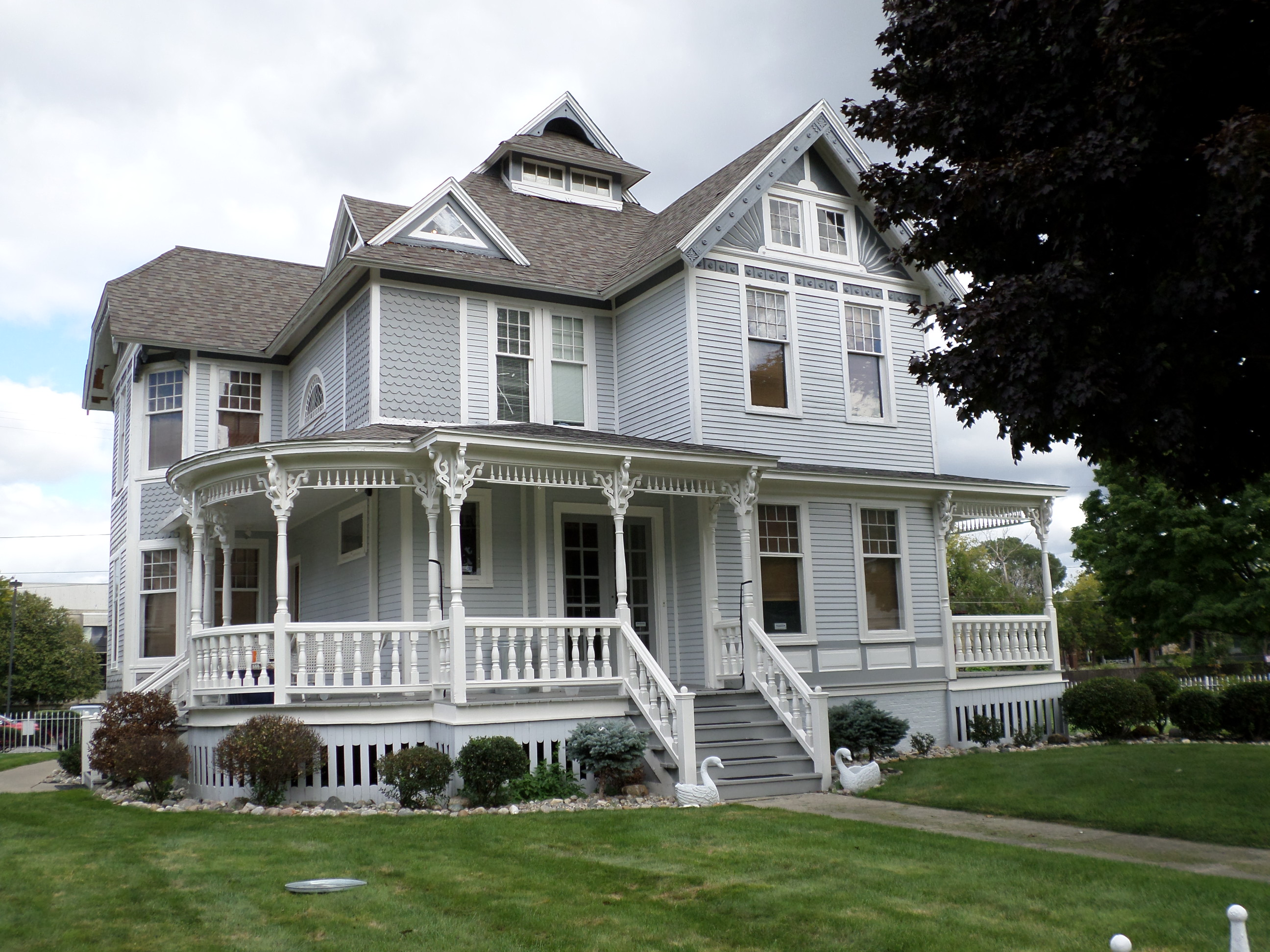

- Location within Michigan Location within the United States
- Interactive map showing the Knight House’s location
- Location: 1105 Church St., Flint, Michigan
- Coordinates: 43°00′33″N 83°41′17″W
- Area: less than one acre
- Built: 1887
- Architectural style: Queen Anne
- NRHP reference No.: 82004680
- Added to NRHP: July 29, 1982

The Morris A. Knight House is a single family home located at 1105 Church Street in Flint, Michigan. It was listed on the National Register of Historic Places in 1982.

== History ==
Morris A. Knight was born in Detroit in 1847; his parents owned and operated a shoe store. In 1863, the family moved to Flint and opened another shoe store. Morris worked for his father for a few years, then moved to Bay City in 1874 to work in a mercantile business. He returned to Flint in 1876 and started a dry goods store, in partnership with O. M. Smith, named O. M. Smith and Company. The store was immediately successful, and in 1880 moved to a larger space. In 1883 Smith and Knight formed a partnership with Jay Thompson to open a second store in Bay City. Meanwhile, their Flint store continued to prosper, and in 1891, they moved to yet larger quarters. By the early 1900s, O. M. Smith and Company had expanded their line of reay-to-wear clothing, dry goods, and other family-related stock to become one of the first true department stores in the area. It remained in business until the Great Depression forced it to close in 1932.

While running a successful business, Knight also started a family. He married Harriett Henderson of Flint in 1877; the couple had three children. In 1887, the couple constructed this residence for their family. Morris A. Knight lived in the house until his death in 1918. Afterward, Harriett Knight lived there until her own death in 1935. The house passed to the Knight's youngest daughter, Alice, who remained in the house until her own death in 1977.

== Description ==
The Morris A. Knight House is a two-story, wood-framed, Queen Anne house with asymmetrical massing. It displays a variety of window shapes and sizes, a varying roofline, and a mix of shingle and clapboard sheathing. The front facade is asymmetrical, with a projecting two-bay section on one side contains two twelve-over-one double hung sash window units on each floor. A gable roof with casement windows and a sunburst carving tops the bays. On the other side is a deeply recessed bay with a double-door entry. A curved wraparound porch with turned columns shelters the entryway; the eaveline of the porch continues across the entire facade. The second floor holds paired nine-over-one sash window units, with fishscale shingling covering the bay. A hipped roof containing a small pediment and dormer tops the bay.

Inside, the house contains a front hall, two parlors and a dining room on the first floor. The hall contains a wood staircase leading to the upper level. The formal rooms contain rich woodwork, sliding doors, and numerous fireplaces with wood mantels and tilework surrounds. The dining room is enhanced with a parquet floor. There is also a kitchen and butler's pantry on the level. The second floor contains large bedrooms and a bath, as well as a smaller maid's bedroom and bath.
