= Knight-Moran House =

Historic house in Tennessee, United States

- Knight--Moran House
- U.S. National Register of Historic Places
- Location within Tennessee Location within the United States
- Nearest city: Franklin, Tennessee
- Coordinates: 36°0′55″N 86°56′18″W
- Area: 4 acres (1.6 ha)
- Built: 1820
- MPS: Williamson County MRA
- NRHP reference No.: 88000295
- Added to NRHP: April 13, 1988

The Knight-Moran House, near Franklin, Tennessee, was built in 1820. Also known as Woodland, and denoted as WM-44. It was listed on the National Register of Historic Places in 1988.

It is a double pen one-and-a-half-story log and frame house. Its east wing was built c.1820 by Winfield Knight as a single pen log house with stone foundation and stone chimney. A c.1840 log pen is joined by a breezeway. It has a c.1860 addition with a c.1960 extension. There are several interesting outbuildings.
