= R. A. Knight-Eugene Lacount House =

Historic house in Massachusetts, United States

- R. A. Knight–Eugene Lacount House
- U.S. National Register of Historic Places
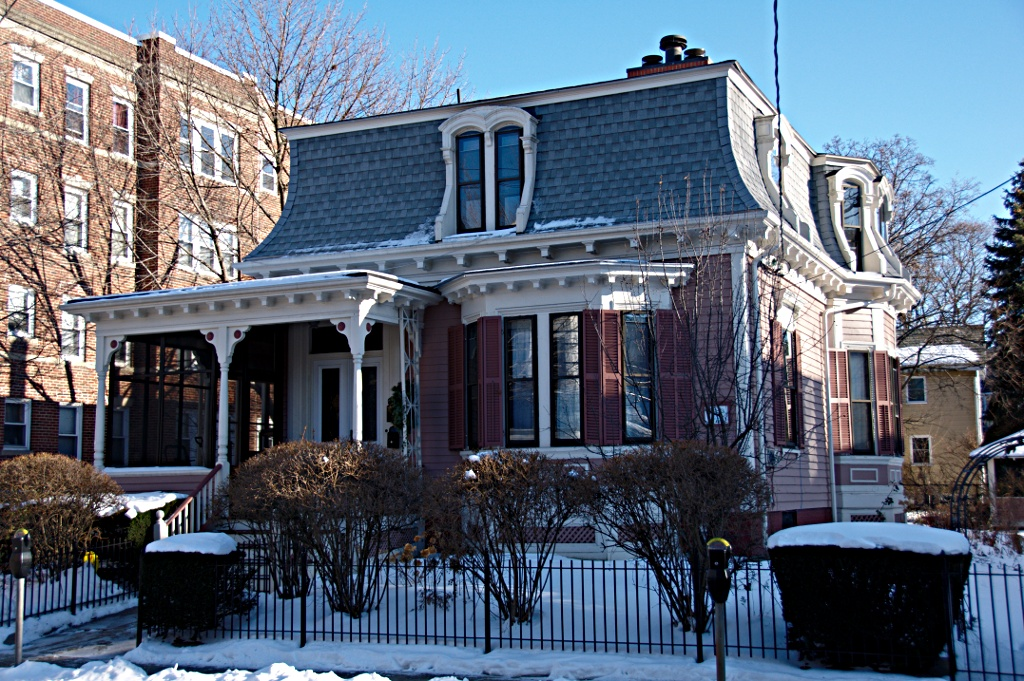

- Location within Massachusetts Location within the United States
- Location: 34 Day Street, Somerville, Massachusetts
- Coordinates: 42°23′42.6608″N 71°7′26.4844″W
- Built: 1870
- Architectural style: Second Empire
- MPS: Somerville MPS
- NRHP reference No.: 89001256
- Added to NRHP: September 18, 1989

The R. A. Knight–Eugene Lacount House is a historic house in Somerville, Massachusetts. The two story Second Empire house was built c. 1870; its second owner was Eugene Lacount, an American Civil War veteran. The house's mansard roof is pierced by recessed dormers with segmented arch dormers. The cornices of the roof, projecting bay tops, and front porch are all studded with modillions, and the front porch features turned posts with decorative brackets.

The house was listed on the National Register of Historic Places in 1989.

== Gallery ==
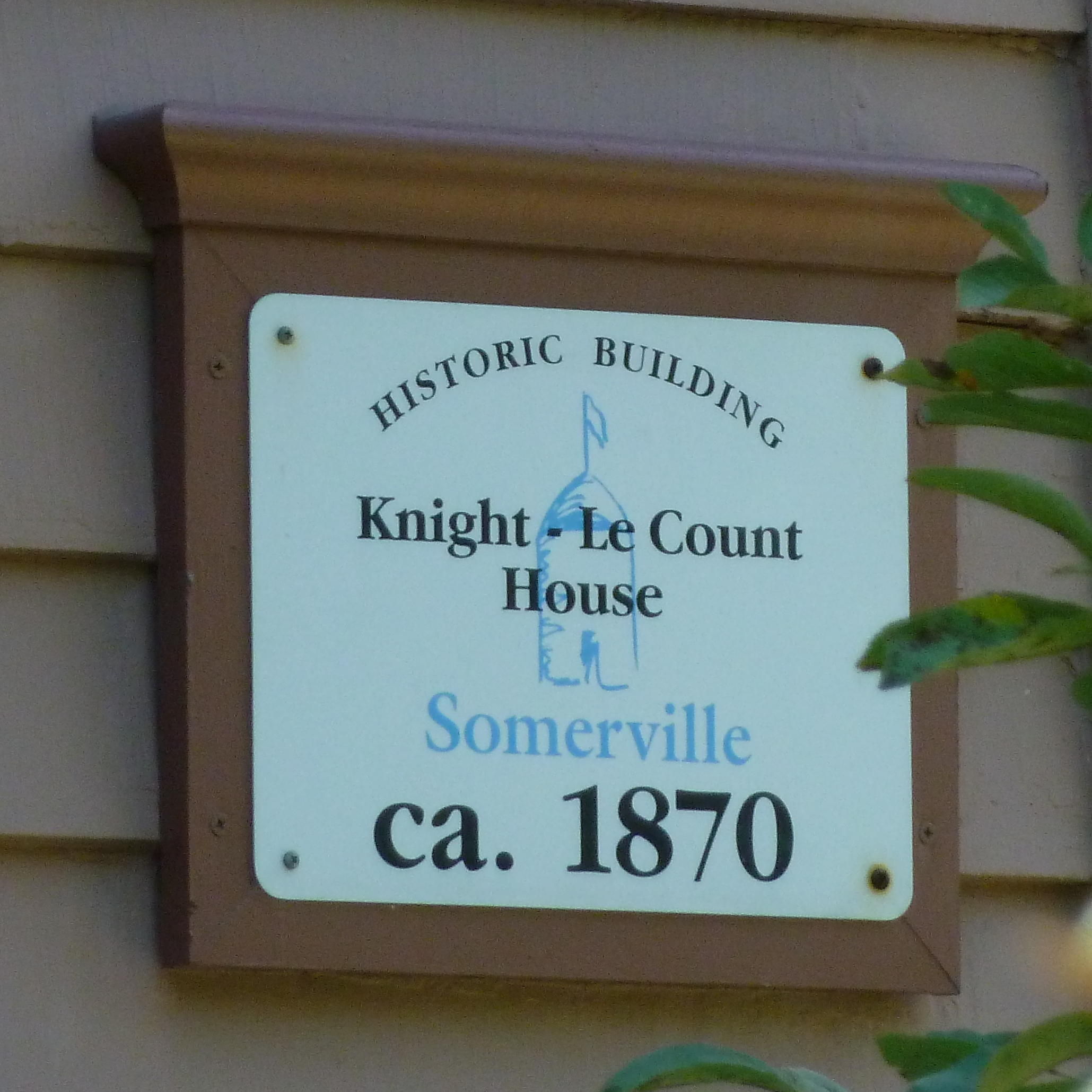
The identifying sign on the face of the R. A. Knight–Eugene Lacount House

== See also ==
- National Register of Historic Places listings in Somerville, Massachusetts
