= J. B. Knight House =

- J.B. Knight House
- U.S. National Register of Historic Places
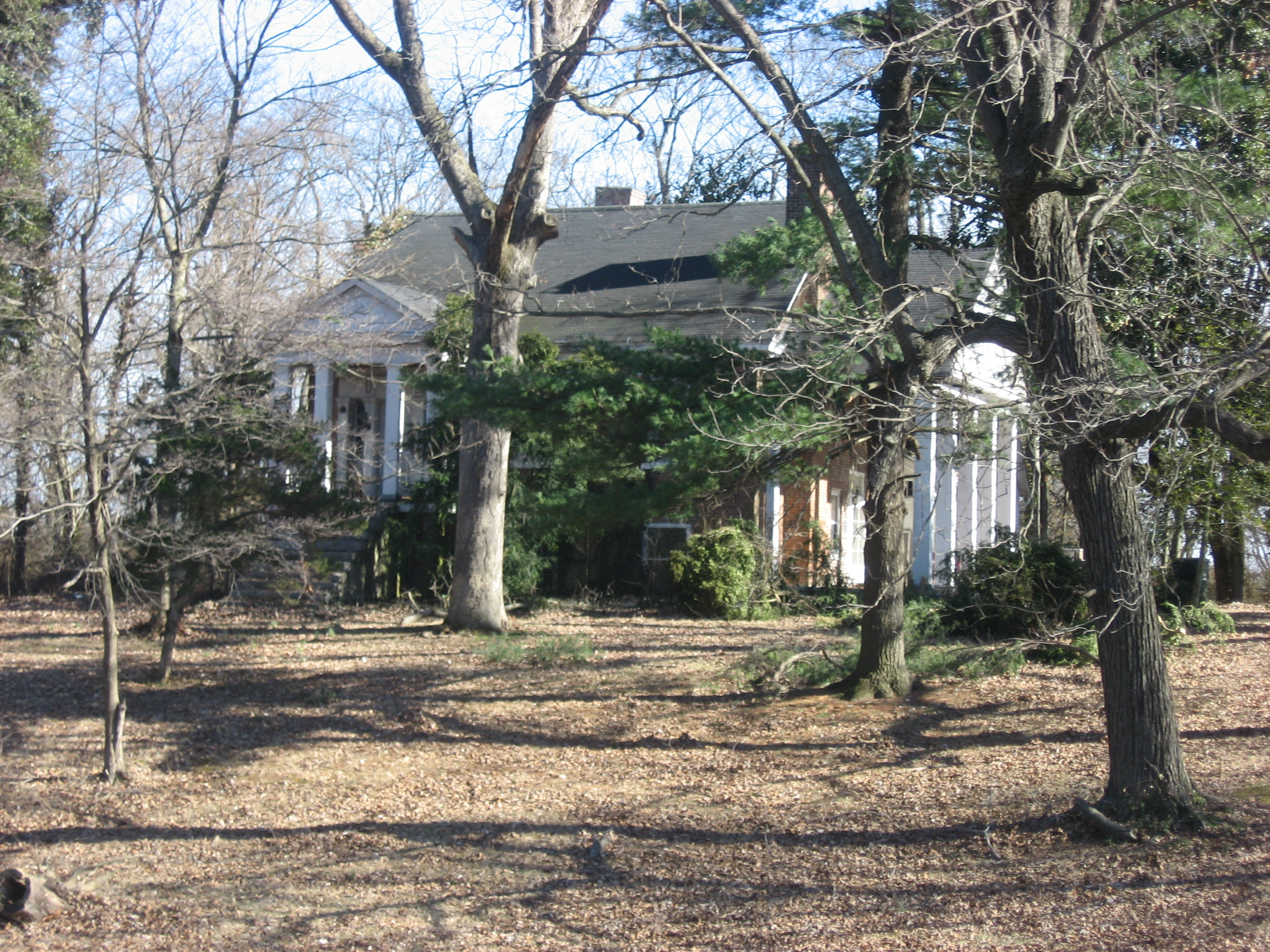

- Location within Kentucky Location within the United States
- Location: 1417, E. 7th St., Hopkinsville, Kentucky
- Coordinates: 36°51′32″N 87°29′11″W
- NRHP reference No.: 79003607
- Added to NRHP: April 30, 1979

J. B. Knight House is listed on the National Register of Historic Places and located in the city of Hopkinsville, Kentucky.
