= Thomas N. Taylor House =

Historic house in Utah, United States

- U.S. National Register of Historic Places
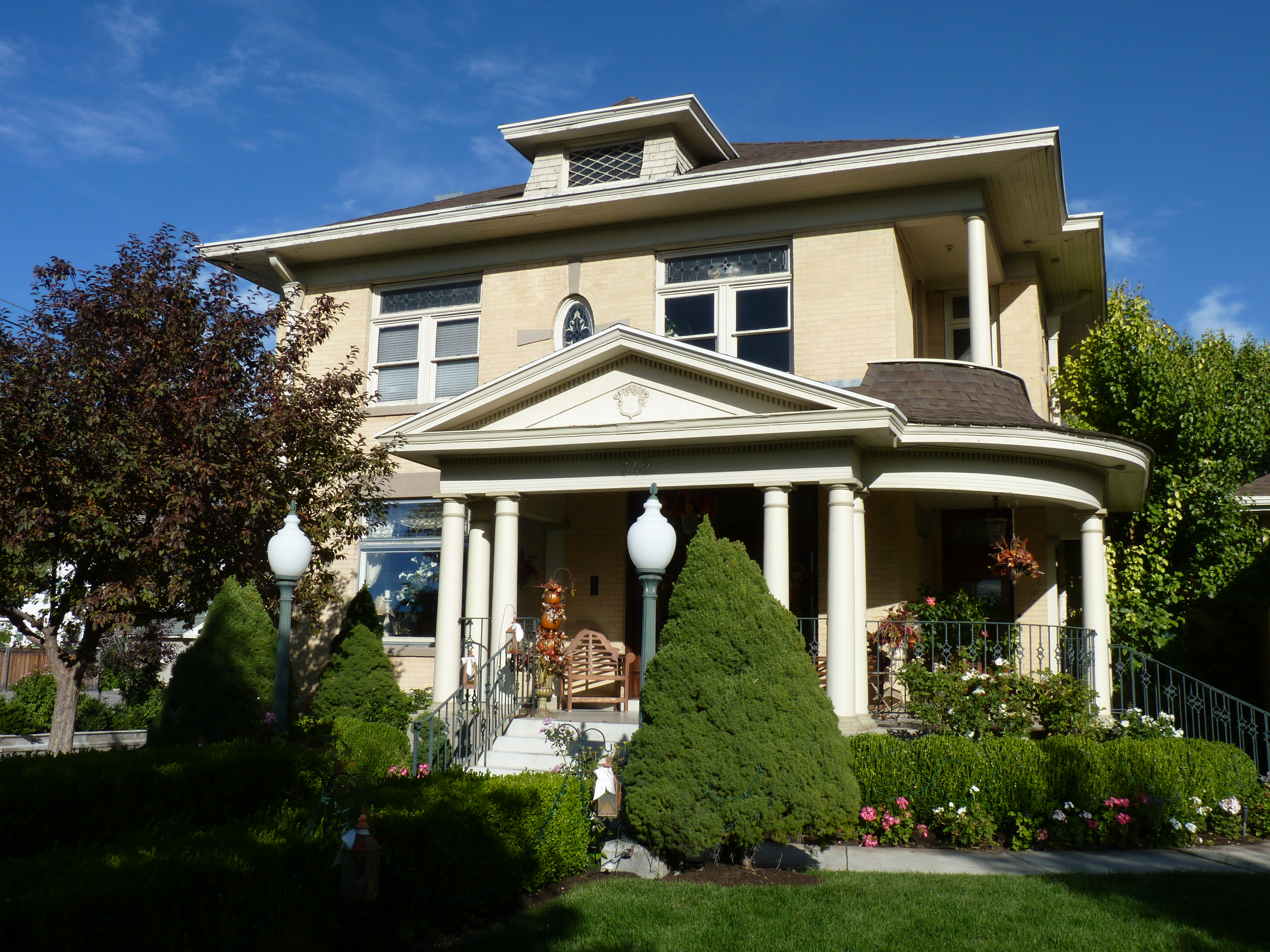
- Thomas Taylor House

- Location within Utah Location within the United States
- Location: 342 North 500 West; Provo, Utah
- Coordinates: 40°14′18.1″N 111°40′1.2″W
- Area: less than one acre
- Built: 1904
- Architect: Richard C. Watkins
- Architectural style: Classical Box
- MPS: Entrepreneurial Residences of Turn-of-the-Century Provo TR
- NRHP reference No.: 82004180
- Added to NRHP: July 23, 1982

The Thomas N. Taylor House is a historic house located at 342 North 500 West in Provo, Utah. It is listed on the National Register of Historic Places.

"Built in 1904, the Thomas N. Taylor house exemplifies the "dream home" of many in Utah's second generation. This house is significant as the most outstanding and well-preserved example of the Classical Box style in Provo. The box style was used extensively in Salt Lake City but was not common in Provo. Its classical detailing, irregular massing and unaltered condition make it particularly distinctive among the limited number of Provo examples of this type. Thomas N. Taylor was a popular man in the area. He served as manager of the Taylor Brothers Store, Provo mayor, and President of the Utah Stake of the LDS Church (Historic Provo p. 9)." The Thomas Taylor House was designated to the Provo City Landmarks register as of July 28, 1995.

== The Victorian Mansions of Provo ==
Built between the years 1893 and 1908 in Provo, Utah, this group of Victorian mansions are historically significant and represent not only fine architecture but some of the most successful men of the city and state at the time. These mansions include the Charles E. Loose House, the William H. Ray House, the Knight-Allen House, the John R. Twelves House, the Jesse Knight House, the Knight-Mangum House, and the Thomas N. Taylor House. All of these homes derive from the high style: Eastlake, Shingle, Craftsman, Italianate, Classical, Moorish, Colonial, and Romanesque Revivals. Made primarily of brick, these homes exhibit the finest architecture and most ornate detailing to be found in the city of Provo.

== Thomas N. Taylor ==
Thomas N. Taylor was born in 1868 in Provo, Utah, the son of George Taylor Sr. and Eliza Nicholls Taylor. His father, George Taylor Sr., had founded the Taylor furniture store in 1866, which was the first furniture store in Provo. "In 1890 the business was incorporated as the Taylor Brothers Company with George, Jr., as vice-president and his mother, Eliza Nicholls Taylor as president. The business expanded, and with new lines of products and new departments, the Taylor Brothers Company became the first big "department store" in Provo (National Park Service p. 2)." Thomas' education consisted of attending Provo schools and eventually Brigham Young Academy (now university). He married Maud Rogers in the L.D.S. Manti temple in the year 1889. Thomas was a political man. He was mayor of Provo from 1900 to 1903, and a candidate for governor of Utah as a democrat in 1920, although he did not win the election.

Thomas was also active in his religion. A prominent member of the L.D.S. faith, Taylor served as bishop of the Provo Third Ward for nineteen years and subsequently served as president of the Utah Stake for twenty years. Taylor also served as a stake patriarch within the LDS Church. Also active within the community, Thomas was a member of the board of trustees of Brigham Young University and served as chairman of that group and of the University of Utah Board of Regents. Taylor also helped to establish the Utah Valley Hospital. Thomas Taylor died in 1950. As for his home, "The house was deeded to Taylor Brothers after Taylor's death. In 1957 David S. Nelson bought the house. He owned it for sixteen years, then sold the house to Verl G. Dixon, a former mayor of Provo."

== Preservation ==
The house was listed on the National Register of Historic Places in 1982 as part of a multiple property submission that nominated seven and listed six Provo houses. The listed houses are the Knight-Mangum House, the John R. Twelves House, the Jesse Knight House, the Knight-Allen House, the William H. Ray House, and this house, the Thomas N. Taylor House. The seventh, the Charles E. Loose House, was determined to be NRHP-eligible but was not NRHP-listed due to owner objection.

== See also ==
- Clark-Taylor House, also known as T.N. Taylor House, also in Provo and NRHP-listed
