= William H. Ray House =

Historic house in Utah, United States

- U.S. National Register of Historic Places
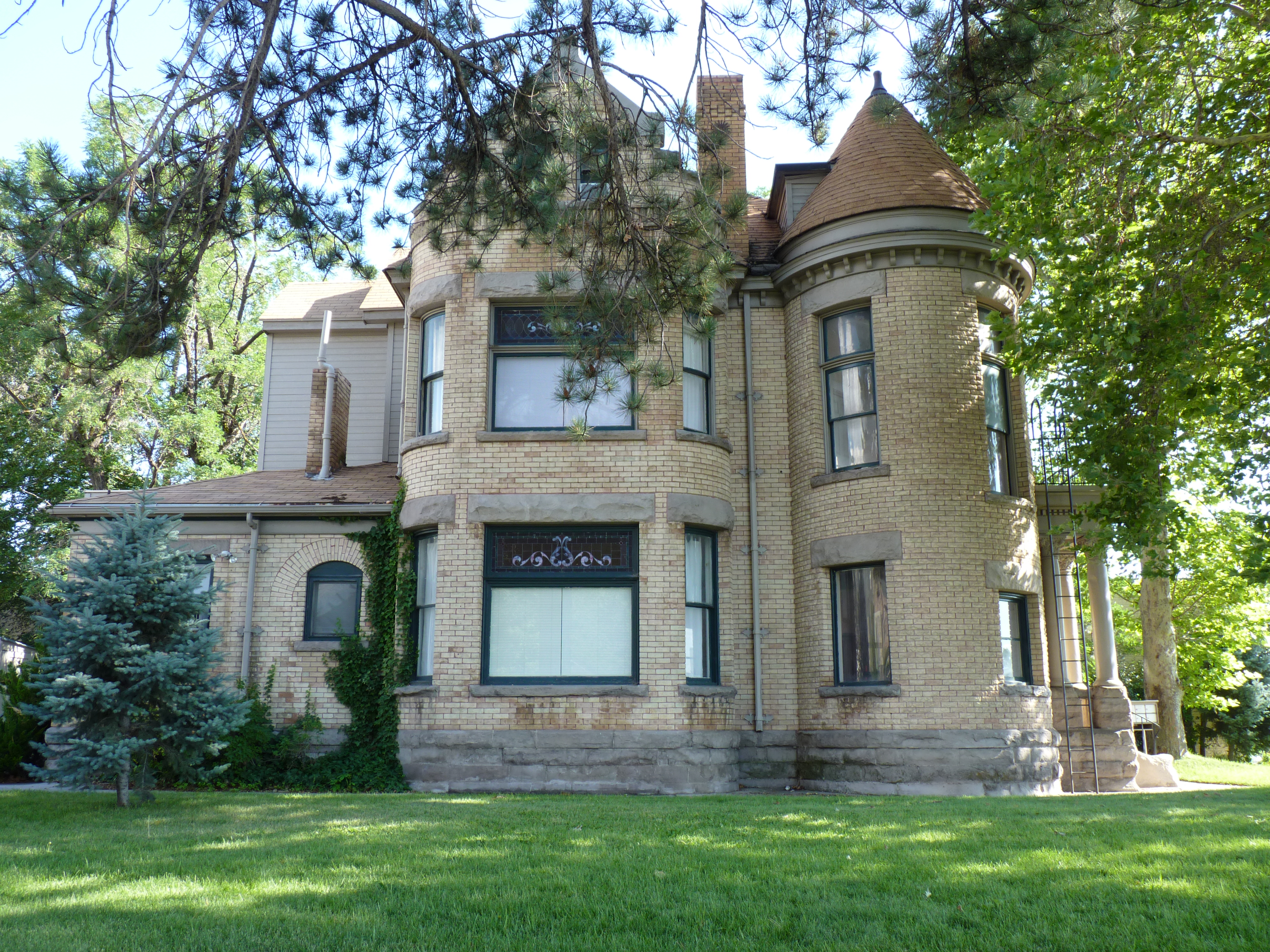
- William H. Ray House

- Location within Utah Location within the United States
- Interactive map showing the location of William H. Ray House
- Location: 415 South University; Provo, Utah
- Coordinates: 40°13′41″N 111°39′27″W
- Area: less than one acre
- Built: 1898
- Architectural style: Romanesque
- MPS: Entrepreneurial Residences of Turn-of-the-Century Provo TR
- NRHP reference No.: 82004178
- Added to NRHP: July 23, 1982

The William H. Ray House is a historic house located at 415 South University Avenue in Provo, Utah. A prominent non-Mormon in Provo, Utah, William H. Ray was one of the founders of the State Bank of Provo. A financier, banker, and broker, Ray organized the Ray Investment Company as an insurance and real estate brokerage firm. The William Ray House, which was built around 1898, "Combines Romanesque Revival elements with classical detailing in a personalized manner (Historic Provo 2002)." The William H. Ray House was added to the National Register of Historic Places in 1982 and was designated to the Provo City Historic Landmark Register on April 28, 1995. It is currently divided into apartments.

== The Victorian Mansions of Provo ==
Built between the years 1893 and 1908 in Provo, Utah, this group of Victorian mansions are historically significant and represent not only fine architecture but some of the most successful men of the city and state at the time. These mansions include the Charles E. Loose House, the William H. Ray House, the Knight-Allen House, the John R. Twelves House, the Jesse Knight House, the Knight-Mangum House, and the Thomas N. Taylor House. All of these homes derive from the high style: Eastlake, Shingle, Craftsman, Italianate, Classical, Moorish, Colonial, and Romanesque Revivals. Made primarily of brick, these homes exhibit the finest architecture and most ornate detailing to be found in the city of Provo.

== William H. Ray ==
Born on December 30, 1864, to William and Martha E. Ray, in Gentry County, Missouri, William H. Ray grew up on a farm. After becoming certified as a teacher, Ray worked in Iowa, Kansas, Nebraska, before settling in Salt Lake in 1890. Once in Salt Lake, Ray worked as a car inspector for the Union Pacific Railroad and then the Oregon Short Line Railway Company, and in addition to this invested in real estate. "In spite of limited salary from the railway company and therefore limited investment funds, in a period of five years he had advanced to become the senior partner in W. H. Ray Company, the largest real estate business in the area (Provo City Library p. 1)." In 1894 William H. Ray married Lottie L. Chappell, and had six children. Ray was a member of the Provo Community Congregational Church. Ray died on October 31, 1936, and was buried in Provo.

== Preservation ==
The house was listed on the National Register of Historic Places in 1982 as part of a multiple property submission that nominated seven and listed six Provo houses. The listed houses are the Knight-Mangum House, the John R. Twelves House, the Jesse Knight House, the Knight-Allen House, this, the William H. Ray House, and the Thomas N. Taylor House. The seventh, the Charles E. Loose House, was determined to be NRHP-eligible but was not NRHP-listed due to owner objection.
