= Webb S. Knight House =

Historic house in South Dakota, United States

- U.S. National Register of Historic Places
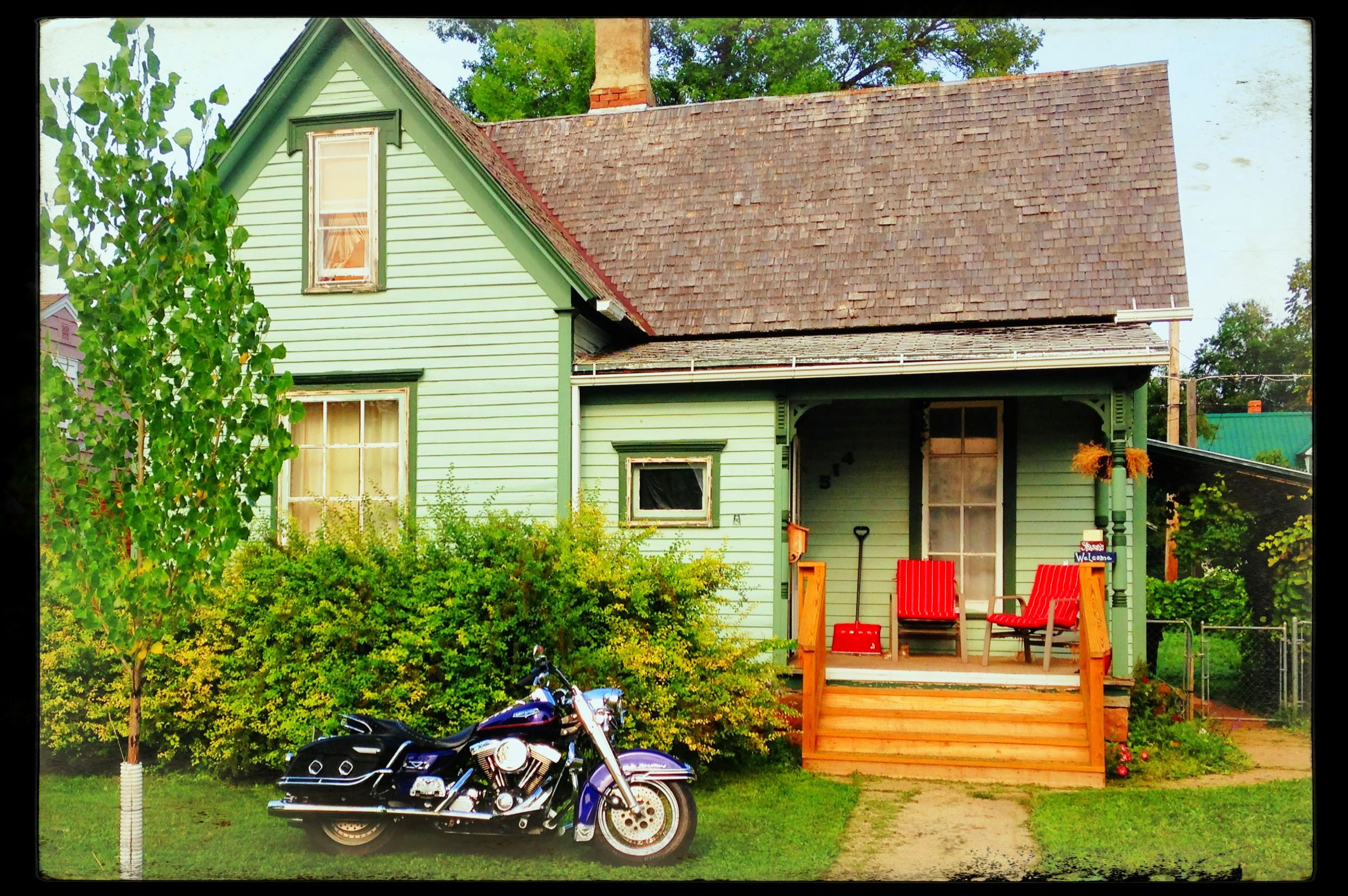
- Location: 514 Seventh St., Spearfish, South Dakota
- Coordinates: 44°29′19″N 103°51′22″W
- Area: less than one acre
- Built: 1892
- Architectural style: Queen Anne
- NRHP reference No.: 89000823
- Added to NRHP: July 13, 1989

The Webb S. Knight House, at 514 7th St. in Spearfish, South Dakota, is "a very simple version of Queen Anne" style house built in 1892. It was listed on the National Register of Historic Places in 1989.

It is a frame house on a stone foundation, with clapboard siding.
