= Samuel S. Jones (Utah politician) =

American mayor (1837–1923)

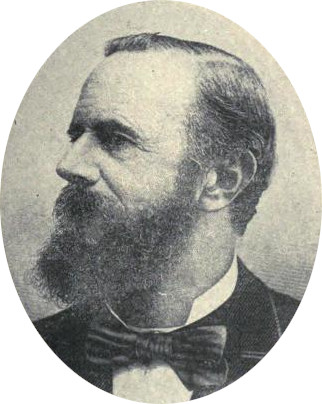
- Born: February 9, 1837; Brentford, England
- Died: December 27, 1923 (aged 86); Provo, Utah
- Known for: Mayor of Provo, Utah

Samuel Stephen Jones (February 9, 1837–December 27, 1923) was mayor of Provo, Utah, from 1898 to 1899.

Jones was born in Brentford, Middlesex, England. He joined the Church of Jesus Christ of Latter-day Saints in 1851 and then immigrated to the United States in 1856 sailing on the S.S. Horizon. He was then part of the Martin Handcart Company, reaching Utah Territory in November 1856.

Jones was involved in many business ventures and was connected with the starting of ZCMI. He also wrote the song "'Tis Utah's Natal Day" and was a part owner in several mining companies. He served several terms in the Provo City Council. He ran unsuccessfully for the Utah State Senate in 1898.
