= Knight–Mangum House =

Historic house in Utah, United States

- U.S. National Register of Historic Places
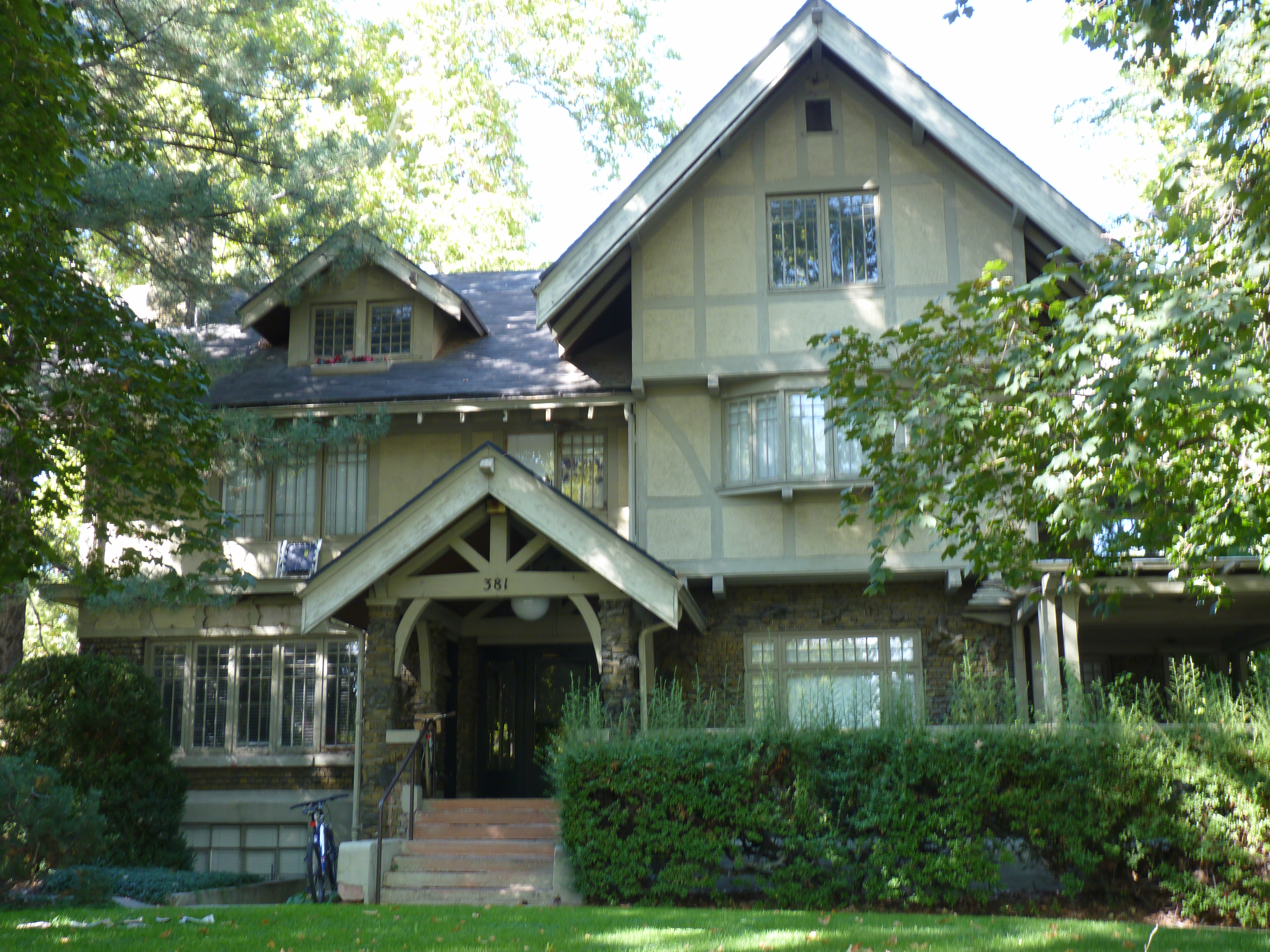
- Knight-Mangum House, September 2011

- Location within Utah Location within the United States
- Location: 381 East Center Street; Provo, Utah; United States
- Coordinates: 40°14′2″N 111°39′4″W
- Area: 0.62 acres (0.25 ha)
- Built: 1908
- Built by: Alexandis Brothers
- Architect: Walter E. Ware
- MPS: Entrepreneurial Residences of Turn-of-the-Century Provo TR
- NRHP reference No.: 82004176
- Added to NRHP: July 23, 1982

The Knight–Mangum House is a historic house located in Provo, Utah, United States. It is listed on the National Register of Historic Places. The mansion was built in the old English Tudor style, completed in 1908. It was built for Mr. W. Lester Mangum and his wife Jennie Knight Mangum. Mrs. Mangum was the daughter of the famous Utah mining man, Jesse Knight. The lot was purchased for $3,500 and the home was built at a cost of about $40,000. The Mangum family was able to afford the home due to the fact that they had sold their shares in Jesse Knight's mine located in Tintic, Utah, for eight dollars a share. They had purchased the shares for only twenty cents a share, so the excess allowed them enough funds to purchase the home. The contractors for the home were the Alexandis Brothers of Provo.

== Description ==
"This two and one half story house in a style which is the product of the Arts and Crafts movement has an asymmetrical composition, steep gable roof with exposed rafters, decorative stick work on the top two stories, cross gables and gable dormers, exposed purlins, decorative brackets along the roofline, and a flat roofed single story porch with exposed rafters that wrap around the southeast corner. The house rests on a raised concrete basement. Clinker brick has been used for the first story, for the posts of the porch, for the chimneys, and for the wall that surrounds the house. The upper stories are of wood frame and stucco with stick work. The windows are grouped in various arrangements, including a three party bay window on the second story gable end of the facade, and are casements with wood stripping around their edges. Changes in the fenestration of the west wall and the addition of a two-story exterior staircase on the northwest corner are alterations which detract from the original integrity of the building, but are not significant enough to destroy its original effect. (Cannon p. 2)"

== The Victorian mansions of Provo ==
Built between the years 1893 and 1908 in Provo, Utah, this group of Victorian mansions are historically significant and represent not only fine architecture but some of the most successful men of the city and state at the time. These mansions include the Charles E. Loose House, the William H. Ray House, the Knight-Allen House, the John R. Twelves House, the Jesse Knight House, the Knight–Mangum House, and the Thomas N. Taylor House. All of these homes derive from the high style: Eastlake, Shingle, Craftsman, Italianate, Classical, Moorish, Colonial, and Romanesque Revivals. Made primarily of brick, these homes exhibit the finest architecture and most ornate detailing to be found in the city of Provo.

== Jesse Knight and the Tintic mining industry ==
The successful commercial mining of precious metals and minerals transformed Utah's economy from basically an agrarian base to a more industrialized state. Within this development the Tintic Mining District, located approximately thirty miles southwest of Provo, was founded in 1869 and by 1899 became the leading mining center in Utah with a value of output placed at $5 million. A central figure in Tintic success was Jesse Knight and the Knight family who resided in Provo. Jesse Knight attained wealth with his Humbug mine in the mid-1890s. The large silver producer allowed Knight to develop other mines in the East Tintic area. Knightsville grew around the workings and became touted as the only saloon-free, prostitute-free, privately owned mining camp in the U.S. His strict adherence to doctrines of The Church of Jesus Christ of Latter-day Saints made the town one inhabited primarily by members of that church.

Jesse Knight was able to expand farther than the tintic mines, reaching to the power plant in Santaquin, the Tintic drain tunnel project, the Knight Dry farm, and the smelters at Silver City. The Bonneville Mining company, the Knight Woolen Mills, Ellison Ranching Company, The American-Columbian Corporation, The Springville–Mapleton Sugar Company, The Spring Canyon Coal Company, Utah Savings Bank, The Layton Sugar Company, and the Tintic Drain Tunnel Company all represent facets of the Knight Investment Company.

== W. Lester and Jennie Knight Mangum ==
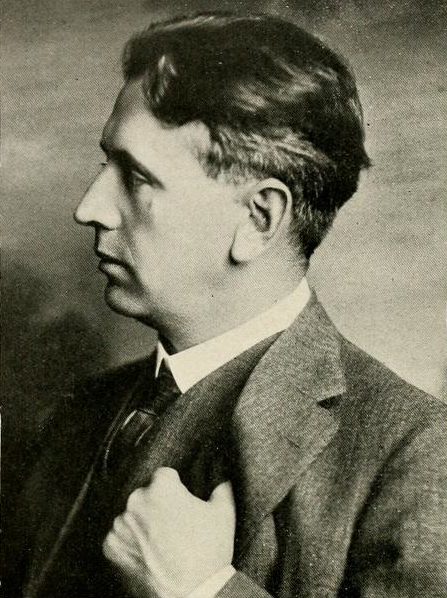
W. Lester Mangum, original owner of the house

W. Lester Mangum was born in 1873 in Nephi, Utah. He attended Brigham Young University and was made an instructor in English there. In 1905 he married Jennie Knight, the daughter of the mining magnate Jesse Knight. Mangum was quickly included in the Knight family businesses and held different executive positions in these businesses. He also served as vice-president and manager of the American Colombian Corporation which owned huge tracts of land in South America. Mangum was active in The Church of Jesus Christ of Latter-day Saints, and served as a member of his stake's high council. Mrs. Mangum was active in civic and church affairs.

== Preservation ==
After the death of Mr. Mangum in 1949, the home was sold to Paul Salisbury of Salt Lake City who divided the home up into eleven individual apartments. In 1969 Mr. Milo Baughman, one of America's leading furniture designers and present chairman of the Environmental Design Department at BYU, acquired the home. It is now used as an apartment building. The carriage house which was built next to the home has also been transformed into apartments as well.

The house was listed on the National Register of Historic Places in 1982 as part of a multiple property submission that nominated seven and listed six Provo houses. The listed houses are this house, the Knight–Mangum House, the John R. Twelves House, the Jesse Knight House, the Knight-Allen House, the William H. Ray House, and the Thomas N. Taylor House. The seventh, the Charles E. Loose House, was determined to be NRHP-eligible but was not NRHP-listed due to owner objection.

The Knight-Mangum mansion was designated as a historic landmark of the city of Provo on April 28, 1995.

== See also ==
- National Register of Historic Places listings in Utah County, Utah
