= Jesse Knight House =

Historic house in Utah, United States

- U.S. National Register of Historic Places
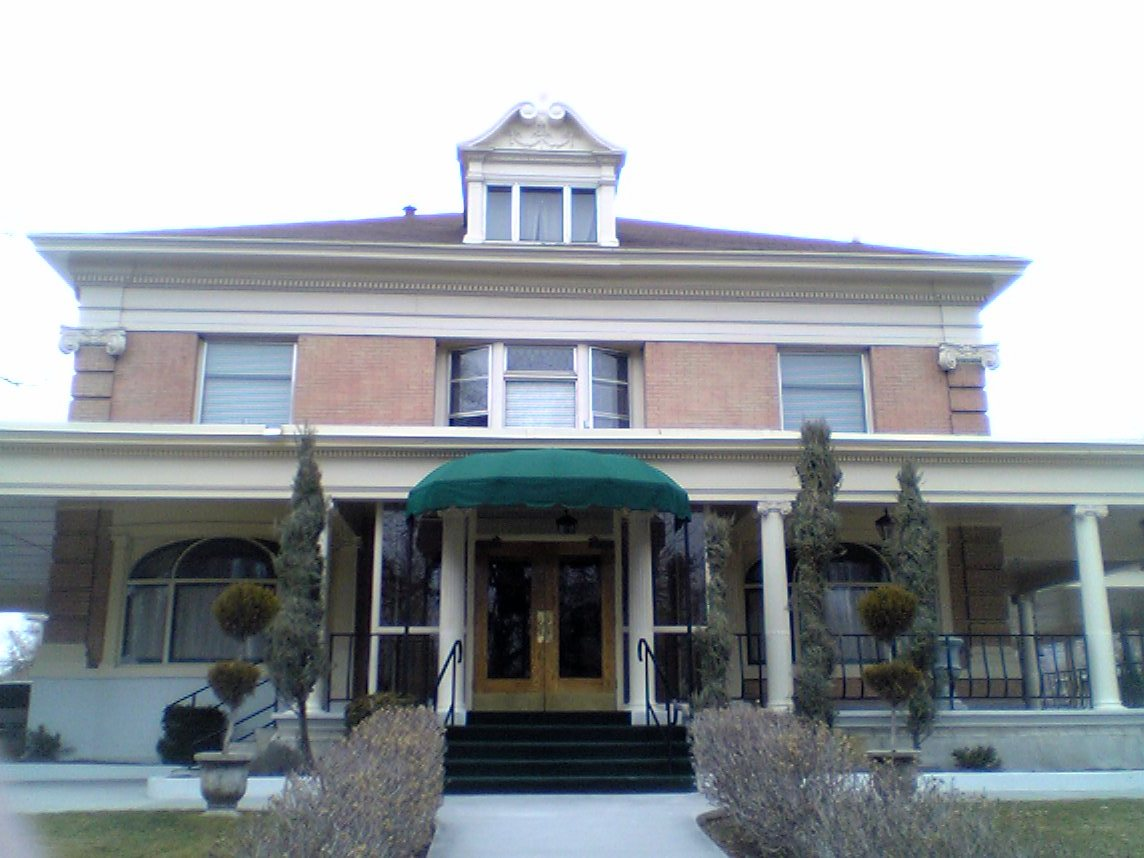

- Location within Utah
- Location: 185 East Center Street; Provo, Utah; United States
- Coordinates: 40°14′02″N 111°39′16″W
- Built: 1905
- Architect: Ware Walter
- Architectural style: Late Victorian, Colonial Revival
- MPS: Entrepreneurial Residences of Turn-of-the-Century Provo TR
- NRHP reference No.: 82004174
- Added to NRHP: July 23, 1982 ] area = less than one acre

The Jesse Knight House, also known as the Knight Mansion, is a historic house in Provo, Utah, United States built for Jesse Knight. It was built in 1905, and added to the National Register of Historic Places in 1982. This home was designated to the Provo City Historic Landmarks Register on June 19, 1996.

== Description ==
=== Jesse Knight ===
Perhaps the wealthiest man in Provo at the time, Jesse Knight was born in 1845 in Nauvoo, Illinois. Knight's family migrated west, and reached Utah in 1850. Eighteen years later Knight married Amanda McEwan and soon began a ranch in Payson, Utah. Following an impression that he had, Knight began a mining operation in the Eureka area and became rich. He subsequently bought other mines, founded a bank, purchased real estate in Provo, bought the Provo Woolen Mills, and started farming and cattle interests in Canada. Throughout all of these efforts Jesse remained an active supporter of the Church of Jesus Christ of Latter-day Saints, and his mines were called the "cleanest mining camps in the west" (Utah State Historical Society p. 2). Knight died in 1921, designating much of his amassed fortune to BYU and various other institutions.

=== Structure ===
Two-and-a-half storeys tall, the Jesse Knight House was built in the Colonial Revival Style. Possessing a symmetrical facade, the detailing of the home exhibits "a broad entablature with a boxed cornice with egg and dart ornament and dentils on the frieze, swan's neck pedimented dormers, Ionic capitals on quoins that are meant to resemble pilasters, pilasters on the corners of the dormers and flanking the first floor windows, and the Ionic columns" (Utah State Historical Society p. 2).

=== The Victorian Mansions of Provo ===
Built between the years 1893 and 1908 in Provo, Utah, this group of Victorian mansions are historically significant and represent not only fine architecture but some of the most successful men of the city and state at the time. These mansions include the Charles E. Loose House, the William H. Ray House, the Knight-Allen House, the John R. Twelves House, the Jesse Knight House, the Knight-Mangum House, and the Thomas N. Taylor House. All of these homes derive from the high style: Eastlake, Shingle, Craftsman, Italianate, Classical, Moorish, Colonial, and Romanesque. Made primarily of brick, these homes exhibit the finest architecture and most ornate detailing to be found in the city of Provo.

=== Jesse Knight and the Tintic Mining Industry ===
The successful commercial mining of precious metals and minerals transformed Utah's economy from basically an agrarian base to a more industrialized state. Within this development the Tintic Mining District, located approximately 30 miles (48 km) southwest of Provo, was founded in 1869 and by 1899 became the leading mining center in Utah with a value of output placed at $5 million. A central figure in Tintic success was Jesse Knight and the Knight family who resided in Provo. Jesse Knight attained wealth with his Humbug mine in the mid-1890s. The large silver producer allowed Knight to develop other mines in the East Tintic area. Knightsville grew around the workings and became touted as the only saloon-free, prostitute-free, privately owned mining camp in the U.S. His strict adherence to doctrines of The Church of Jesus Christ of Latter-day Saints made the town one inhabited primarily by members of that Church.

Jesse Knight was able to expand farther than the tintic mines, reaching to the power plant in Santaquin, the Tintic drain tunnel project, the Knight Dry farm, and the smelters at Silver City. The Bonneville Mining company, the Knight Woolen Mills, Ellison Ranching Company, The American-Columbian Corporation, The Springville-Mapleton Sugar Company, The Spring Canyon Coal Company, Utah Savings Bank, The Layton Sugar Company, and the Tintic Drain Tunnel Company all represent facets of the Knight Investment Company. The architects Walter E. Ware and Alberto O. Treganza either separately or together were engaged in the construction of the Jesse Knight House.

=== Preservation ===
The house was listed on the National Register of Historic Places in 1982 as part of a multiple property submission that nominated seven and listed six Provo houses. The listed houses are the Knight-Mangum House, the John R. Twelves House, this, the Jesse Knight House, the Knight-Allen House, the William H. Ray House, and the Thomas N. Taylor House. The seventh, the Charles E. Loose House, was determined to be NRHP-eligible but was not NRHP-listed due to owner objection.

== See also ==
- National Register of Historic Places listings in Utah County, Utah
