= Jesse Knight =

American businessman

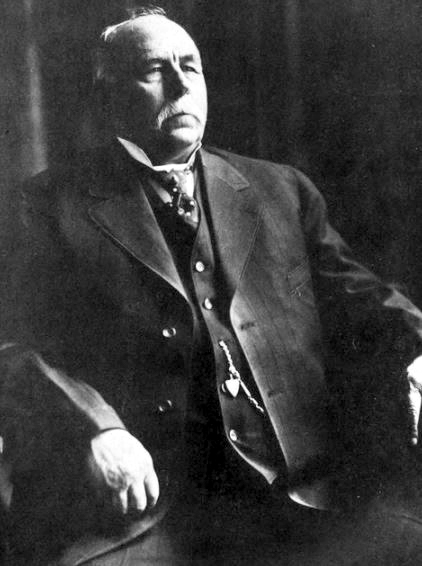
- Jesse Knight ca. 1913

Personal details
- Born: Jesse Knight; September 6, 1845; Nauvoo, Illinois, United States
- Died: March 14, 1921 (aged 75); Provo, Utah, United States
- Resting place: Provo City Cemetery; 40.223°N 111.644°W
- Known For: Founding of Raymond, Alberta, Canada
- Residence: Jesse Knight House
- Spouse(s): Amanda Knight
- Children: including: Raymond Knight; Inez Knight Allen
- Parents: Newel Knight; Lydia Knight

Jesse Knight (6 September 1845 – 14 March 1921) was an American mining magnate, one of relatively few Latter-day Saints in 19th century Western America to find major success in the field.

After the death of his father Newel Knight, Jesse's family was poor throughout his youth. As a young man, he worked as a prospector and discovered the Humbug Mine in the Tintic Mining District near Eureka, Utah in 1896. As the Humbug proved profitable, he acquired other mines in the vicinity, including the Uncle Sam, Beck Tunnel, Iron Blossom, and Colorado mines. After making his fortune, Knight went on to found the Latter Day Saint settlement of Raymond, Alberta, Canada. In 1964, he was inducted into the Hall of Great Westerners of the National Cowboy & Western Heritage Museum.

== Biography ==
Knight was born in Nauvoo, Illinois to Newel and Lydia Knight, two prominent members of the Church of Jesus Christ of Latter-day Saints (LDS Church). When Jesse was one-year-old, his family was forced to flee Nauvoo as Mormon pioneers under the leadership of Brigham Young. Jesse's father died in Nebraska on the Mormon Trail in January 1847; his mother and eight siblings continued on but were not able to reach their Salt Lake Valley destination until early 1850.

Knight is significant in Western American mining and entrepreneurial history because in several important ways he differed from the stereotypical "robber baron" capitalists of the late-nineteenth century Gilded Age. His success, like those of others, depended upon the skillful acquisition and management of such business variables as claims, labor, capital, technology, and government services, and also upon the development of cost-efficient integrated enterprises, such as the Knight Investment Company. However, Knight also owned more patented mining claims in the Intermountain West than did his counterparts, and he was not inclined to engage in stock manipulation like many other mining entrepreneurs and railroad barons. Moreover, his business methods, especially when dealing with working men, were far more paternalistic and benevolent than others in the industry. While many other company town and mine owners often exploited their workers, Knight was known for fair treatment and wages in Knightsville, Utah. He equipped the city with a meetinghouse, amusement hall, and school but insisted the city should not have a saloon as he disapproved of drunkenness.

Although Knight's philanthropy was not unique for the period, his generous gifts to Brigham Young University (an interest he shared with his wife, Amanda) earned him the reputation as a patron saint of BYU. He also donated freely to his church and to many church-related projects. Furthermore, his home in Provo, Utah, did not rival the mansions built by big businessmen from San Francisco's Nob Hill to New York's Fifth Avenue.

Knight was known by the moniker "Uncle Jesse" during his lifetime. In his writing, he expressed a belief that his money was for the purpose of doing good and building up his church; he regarded the matter as a "trusted stewardship." As he once said, "The earth is the Lord's bank, and no man has a right to take money out of that bank and use it extravagantly upon himself." Although he strayed from the LDS Church in his early years and briefly affiliated with the anti-Mormon Liberal Party in Utah, he was a devout member for most of his life and helped to save the LDS Church from financial ruin incurred from legal battles with the federal government over control of the Utah territory and issues such as polygamy.

After making his fortune in mining, Knight went on to develop settlement and industry in what is today southern Alberta. In 1901, Knight purchased 30,000 acres (120 km^{2}) of land in Canada's Northwest Territories for $2.50 per acre. On this property he established a ranch; Knight later went on to acquire another 226,000 acres (915 km^{2}) of land near his ranch and established a town built around irrigation farming of sugar beets, which were then processed in a local sugar factory that Knight built. The settlement was named Raymond in honor of his son, Raymond Knight. Within five years, over 1,500 Latter-day Saints—mostly from Utah—had immigrated to Raymond. The town incorporated in 1903, and today Knight is honored as the founder of Raymond, Alberta.

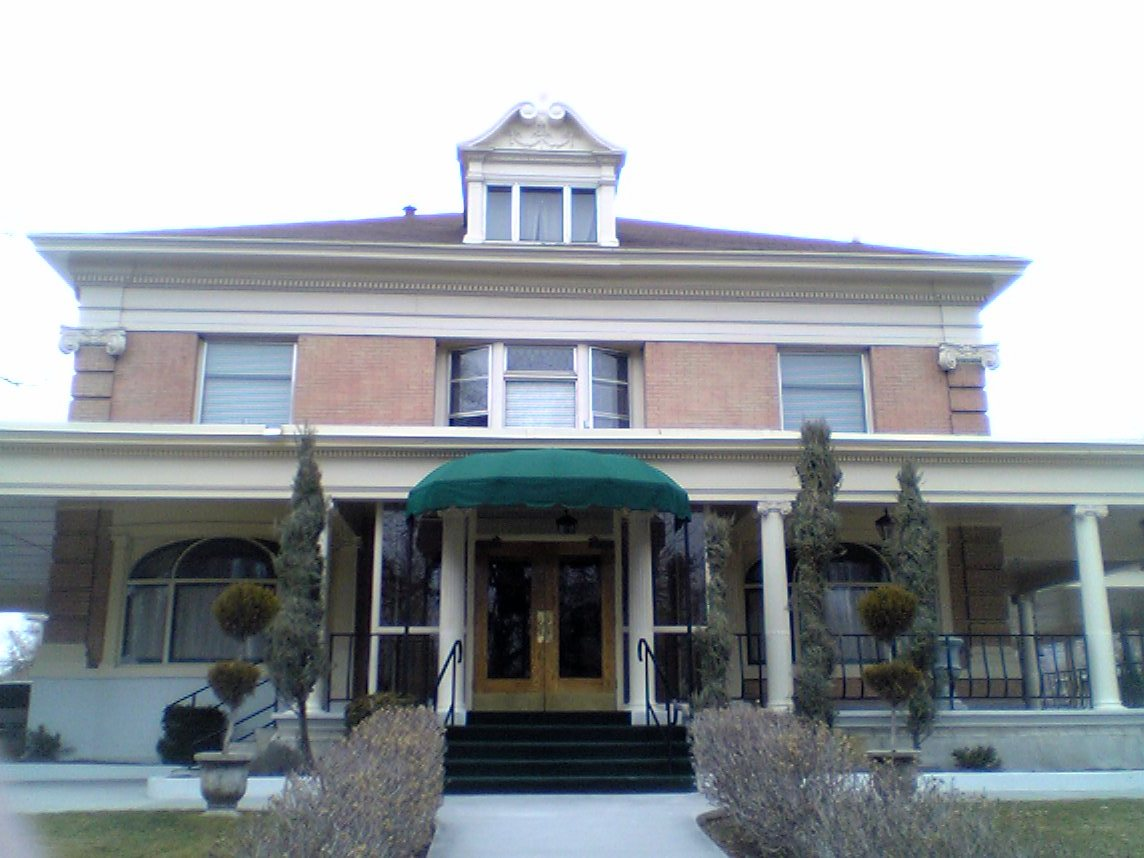
Knight Mansion - built 1905 in Provo, UT

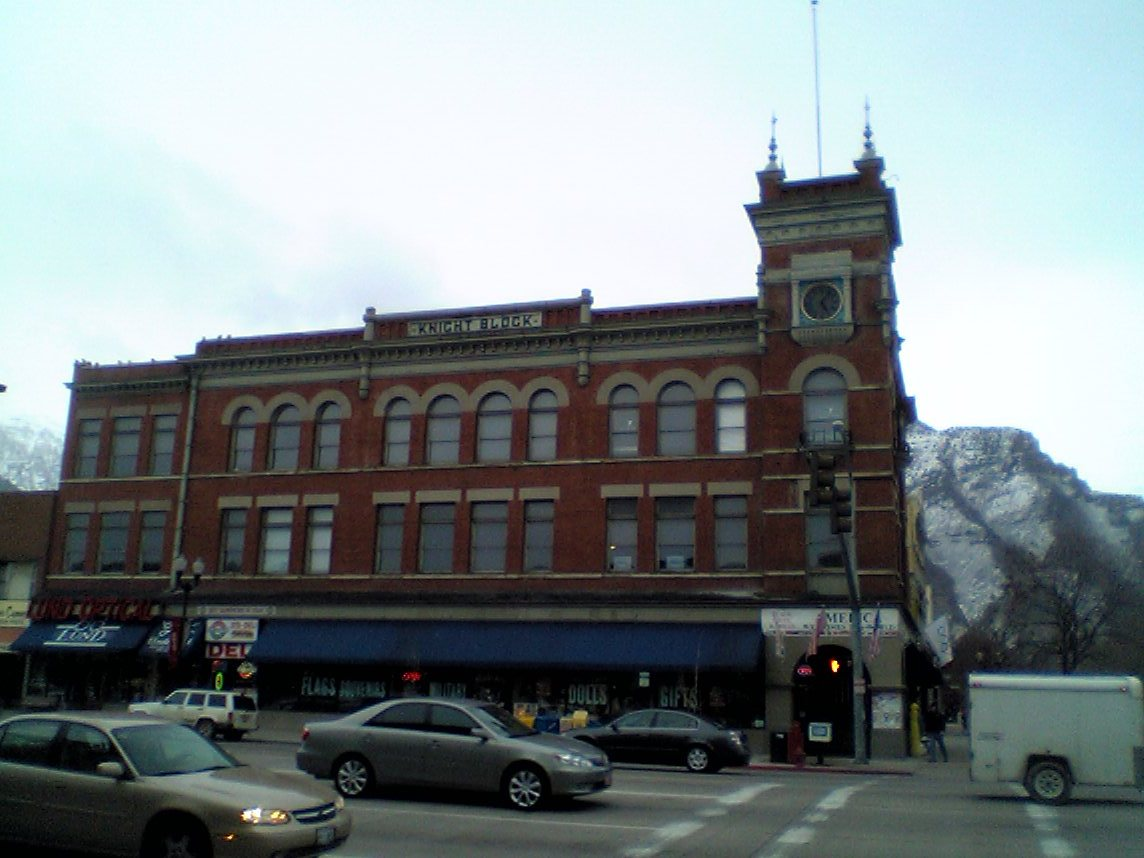
Knight Block built 1900 downtown Provo, UT

== Legacy ==
- Knightville, Utah - mining town
- Knightville Road - Juab County, Utah
- Knight Academy - Raymond, Warner County, Alberta, Canada

== See also ==
- Inez Knight Allen - daughter
- Ray Knight (rodeo organizer) - son
- Tintic Standard Reduction Mill
- Yankee Headframe - mining structure
