= Clear toy candy =

Variety of hard, boiled sweet

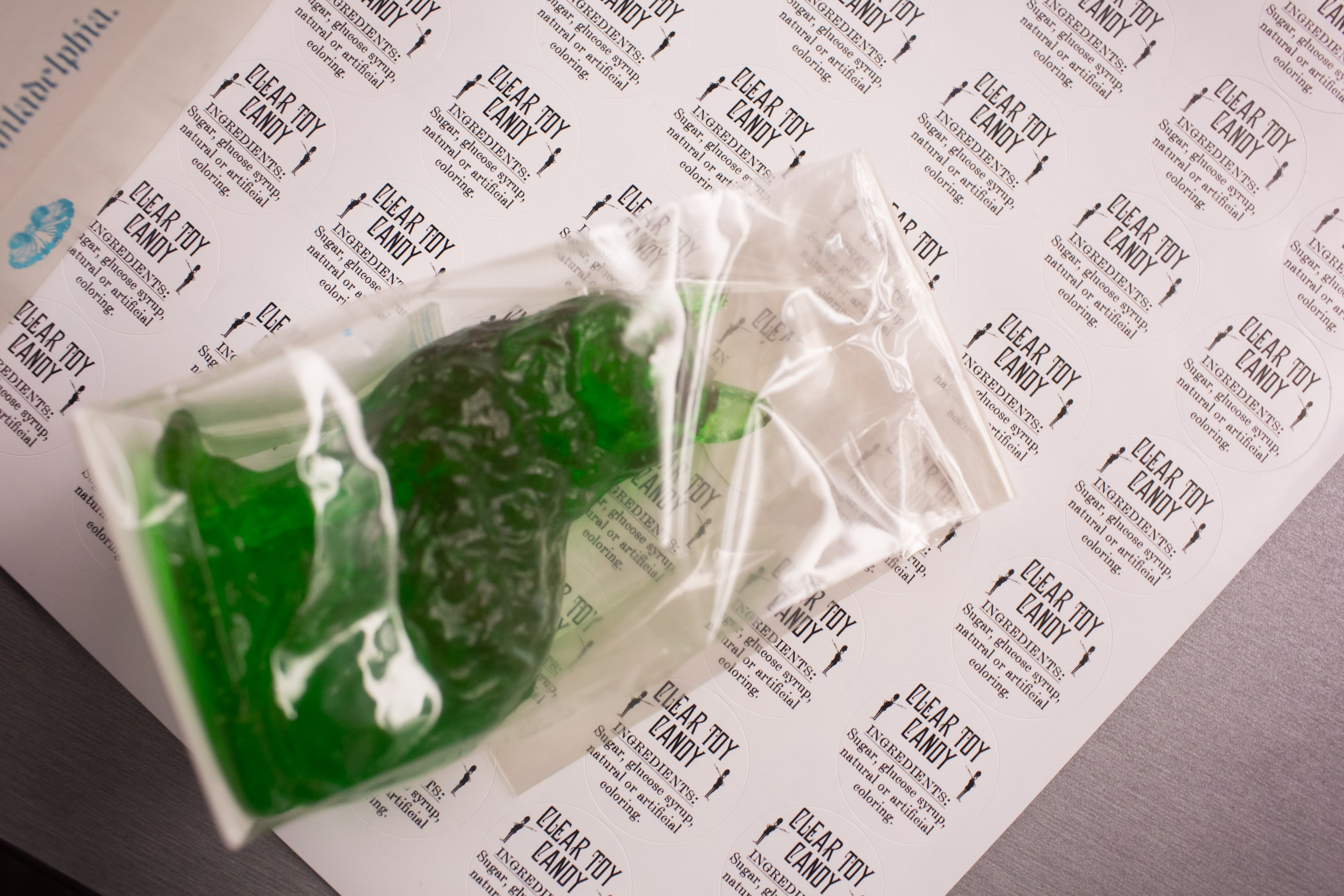
A wrapped piece of clear toy candy

Clear toy candy is a traditional confectionery that originated in Germany. It is especially popular at Easter and Christmas. The hard candy is made in molds, in a multitude of fanciful shapes. The candy is tinted in bright colors, traditionally yellow, red and green. A stick is sometimes added before the candy completely cools to make a lollipop.

The names clear toy candy and barley sugar are sometimes used interchangeably to refer to clear molded sugar candy. However traditional barley sugar is made with barley water, while clear toy candy is made with pure water. Unmolded barley sugar originated in France in the 1700s, while molded sugar candy (with or without barley as an ingredient) dates to the 1800s. Confusion arises because the older term "barley sugar" became genericized and was applied to a wide range of boiled sugar candies during the 1800s.

== Candy making ==
Traditional recipes for clear toy candy tend to include sugar, cream of tartar or corn syrup, and water. The candy's natural color when cooled is yellow. Sometimes natural food coloring is added to make it red or green. The molds are greased with olive oil, also referred to as "sweet oil", to prevent sticking. The mold was removed while the candy was still somewhat soft, and less likely to break. Rough edges were then smoothed off. Clear toy candy was often made in colder weather, to avoid the clouding and stickiness that could result from heat and humidity during cooling.

A cookbook published in Chicago in 1883 includes a recipe specifically for molded clear toy candy: "222. Candy for Christmas Toys, Etc." A modern recipe for clear toy candy has been published by Nancy Fasolt.

The following photographs were taken at a candy-making demonstration by Ryan Berley of Shane Confectionery at the Chemical Heritage Foundation in Philadelphia. They show the candy molds being prepared, filled, and opened to remove the candy after cooling.

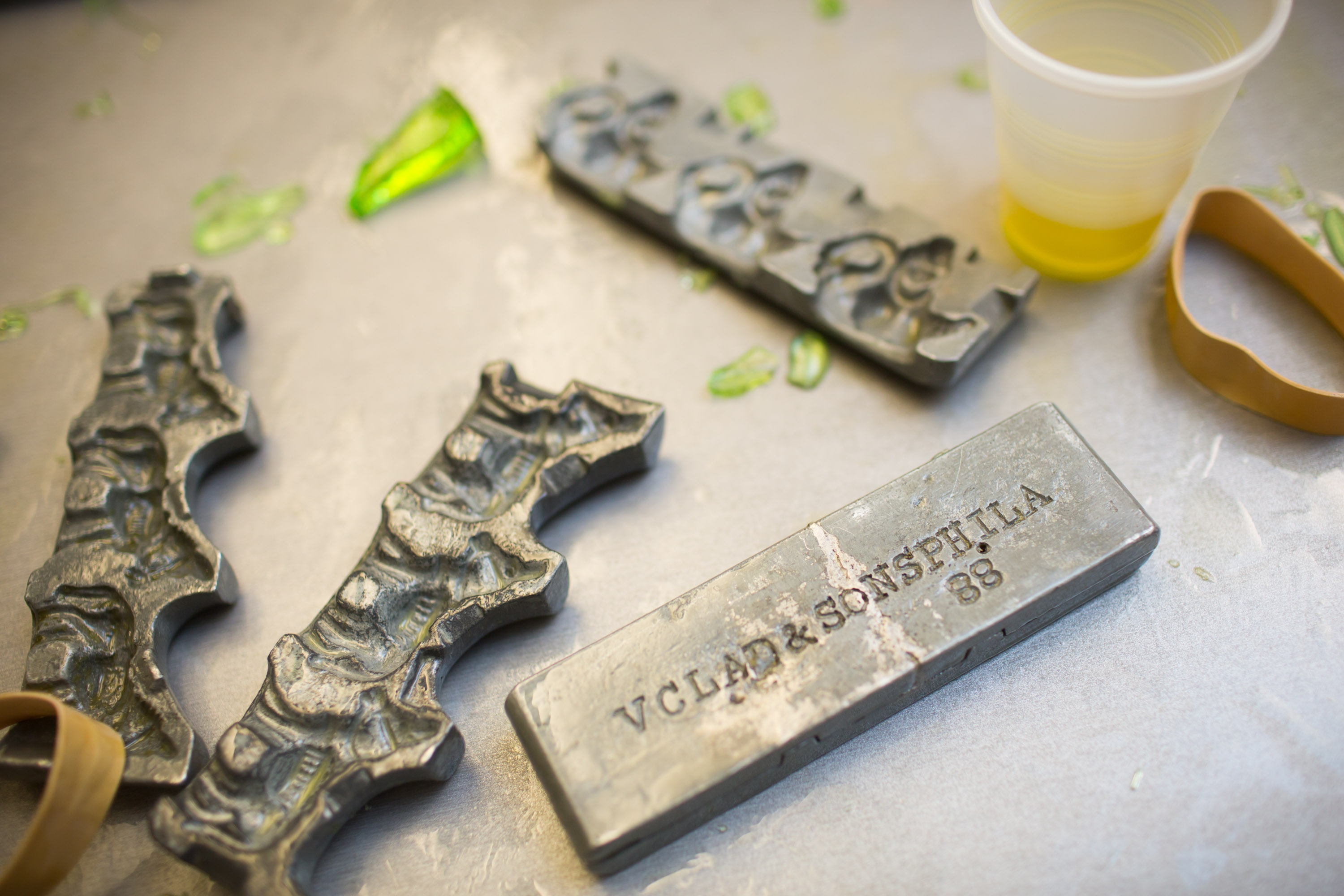
Clear toy candy molds

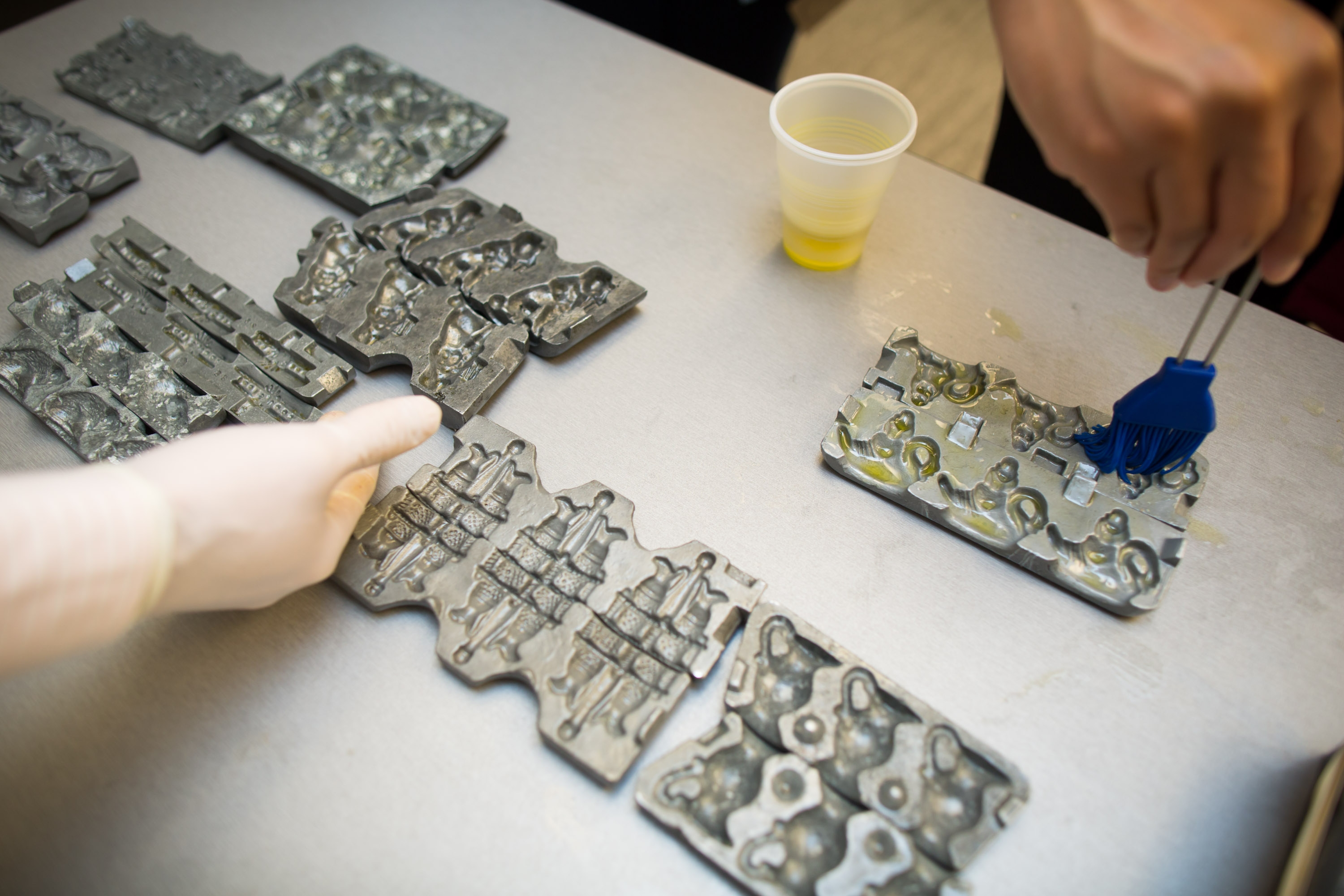
Brush with olive oil to prepare molds

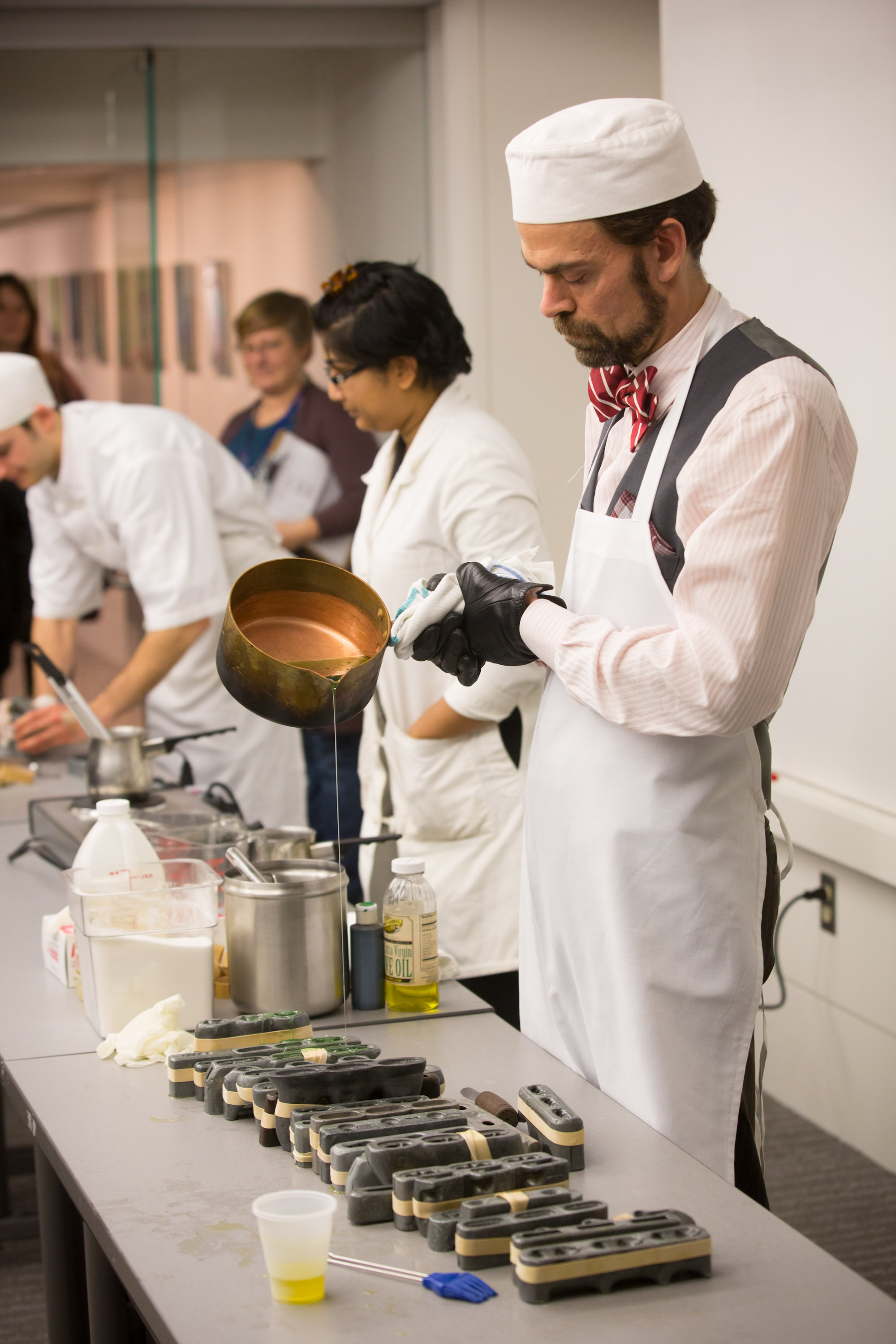
Pouring liquid sugar solution into clear toy candy molds

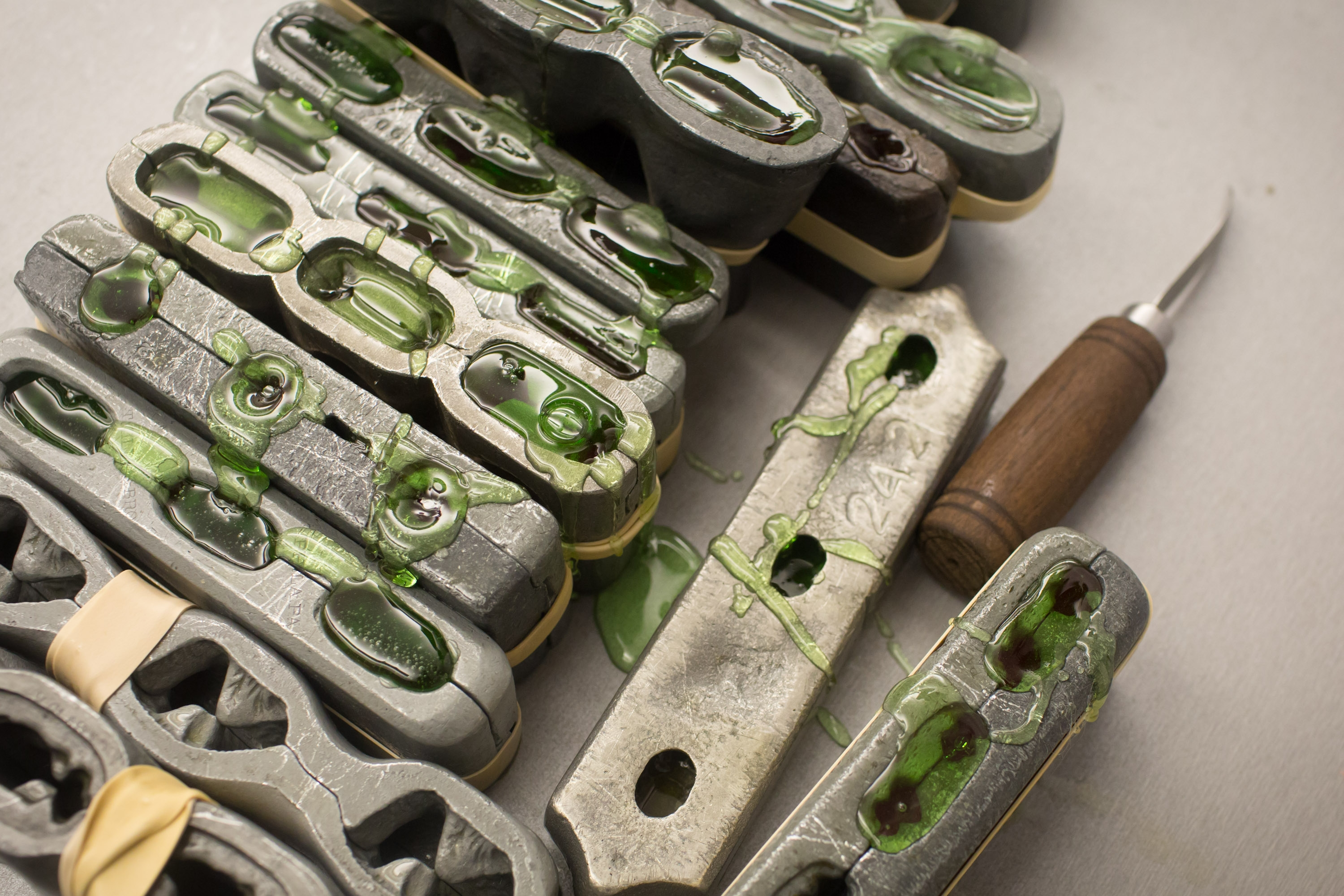
Filled candy molds

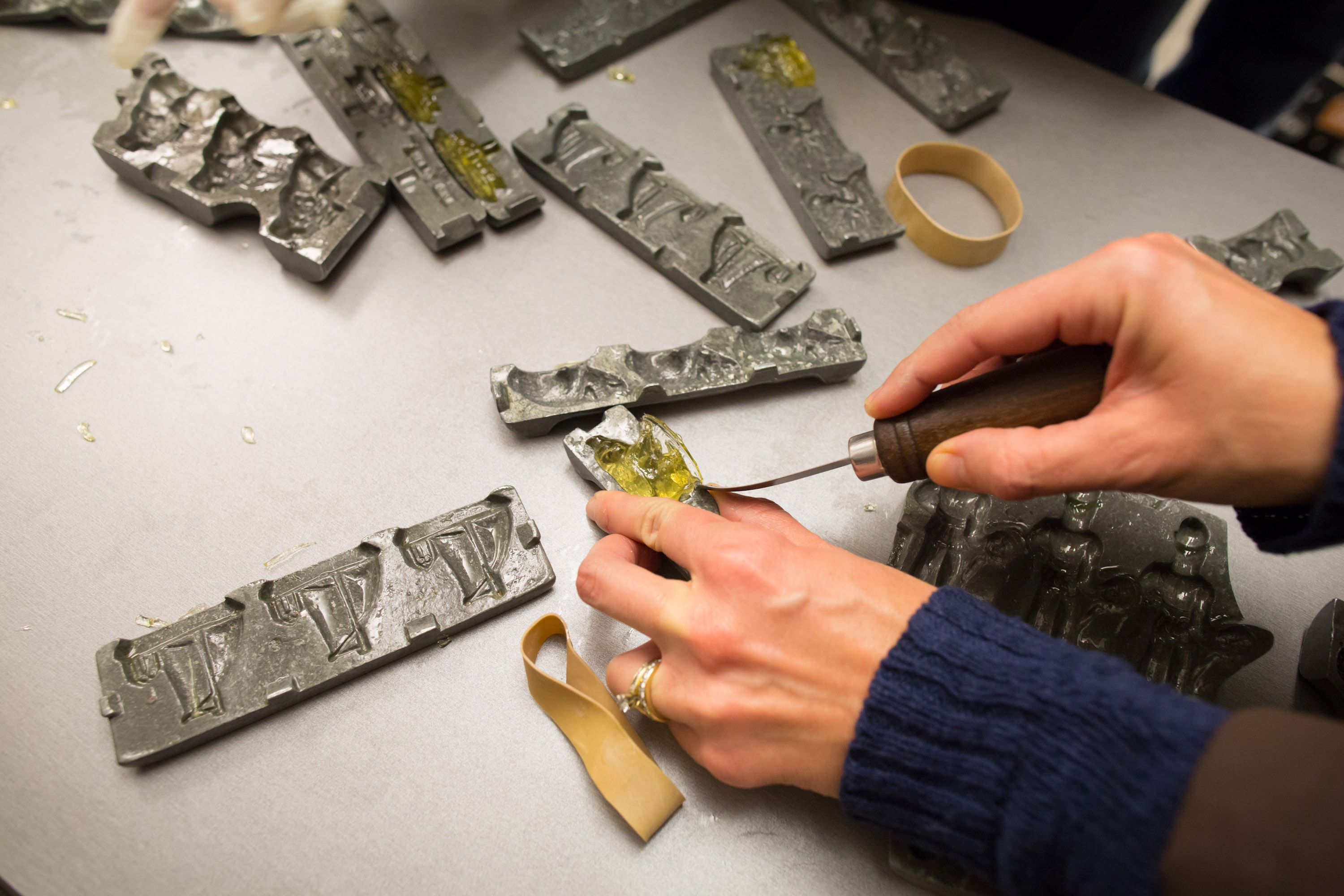
Removing candy from mold

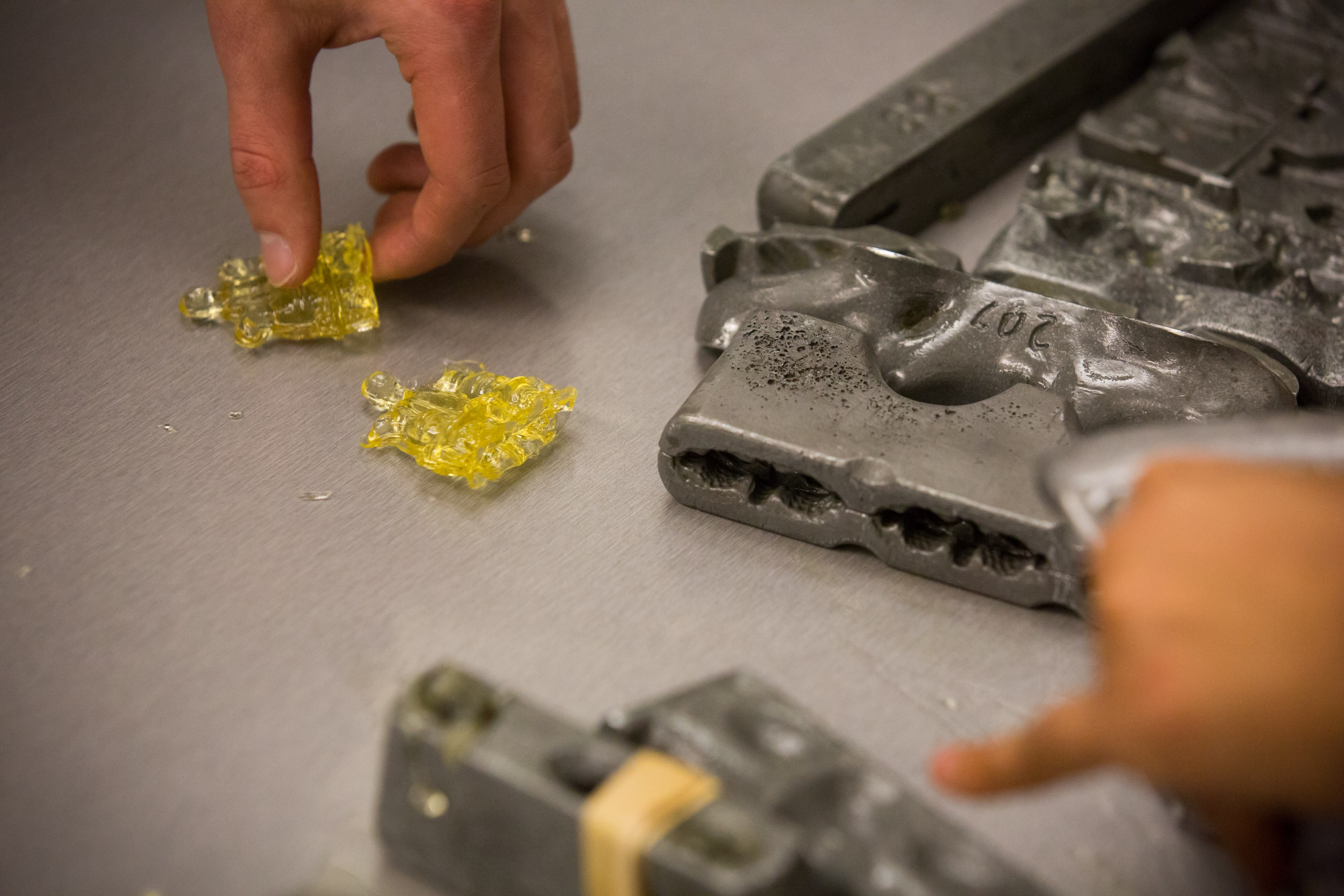
After removal from the mold

== Candy makers ==
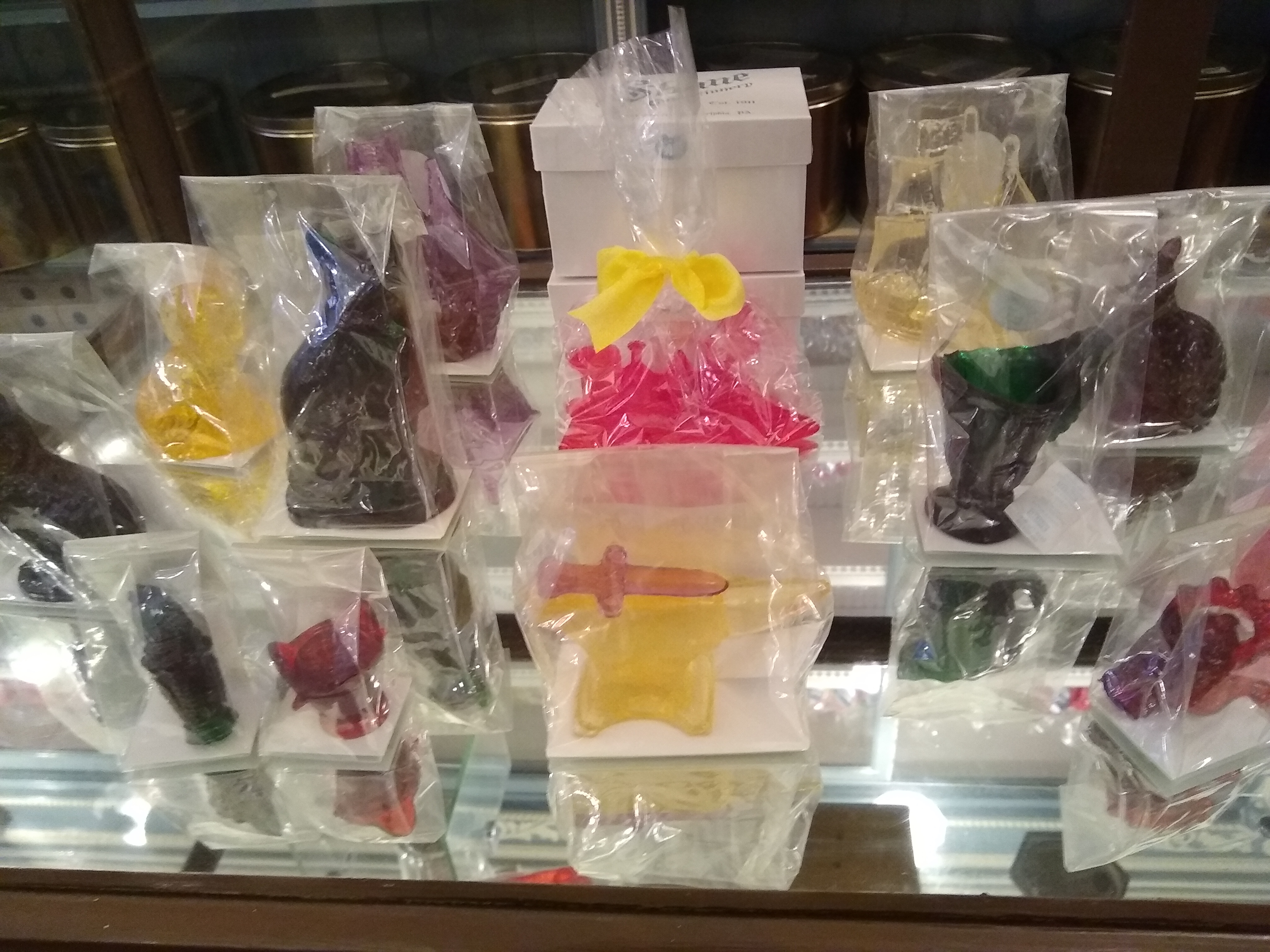
A shop display

Clear toy candy originated in Germany where it was sometimes called roter zuckerhase (the red sugar hare) or Dierich Orde Glass.

Most of the clear toy makers have been family-run businesses. One of the earliest clear toy candy makers in North American was William Daw Startup. William had learned candy making from his father in England. William and his wife Hagar founded the Startup Candy Factory in Provo, Utah in 1875. William died in 1878, but his wife and later his children continued the business.

Clear toy candy came to the Philadelphia, Pennsylvania area of North America with German settlers. An active candy-making industry grew up around Philadelphia because it was a center for the sugar trade.

Regennas Candy was founded in 1894 by C. Fred Regennas, and continued by his children. Regennas sold candy in Philadelphia from a horse-drawn wagon, before moving to Lititz, Pennsylvania.

Young's Candies of Philadelphia was established by Johan Jung (later known as John Young) in 1897. Also a family business, it was run by Harry Young Jr. from the 1940s until his death in 2007. Many of Harry Young's clear toy candy molds were sold to the Berley brothers, who took over Shane Confectionery in 2010. Shane Confectionery continues to make and sell clear toy candy for Easter and Christmas.

Mima Mae Wolfgang started Wolfgang Candy in York, Pennsylvania with her husband in 1918. She designed the patterns for many of her molds. Wolfgang Candy sold candy to consumers until January 2018, when it limited sales to businesses and became Wolfgang Confectionery.

Shelly Brothers of Souderton, Pennsylvania, established in the 1930s, made clear toy candy until it was bought out in 1990 by the Brock Candy Company (later Brach's).

Clear toy candy maker Albert Dudrear of York, Pennsylvania was an avid mold collector and candy historian. He was succeeded in selling Original Clear Toy Candy by his son-in-law Donald Culp.

Clear toy candy is also found in Atlantic Canada, where it appeared as early as the 1880s. Robertson's Candy, founded in Truro, Nova Scotia by William C. Robertson in 1928, continues to make traditional clear toy candy at Christmas time.

== Mold makers ==
Molds for making clear toy candy have traditionally been made from an alloy of tin and zinc called "composition", iron, aluminum, lead, or pewter. Lead and pewter are now known to be harmful if ingested, and should not be used to make clear toy candy. Composition molds are often considered the best for candy-making, because they give better detail.

Valentine Clad came from Alsace, France to Philadelphia and opened a business in 1853. He made cooking and candy-making equipment, including clear toy candy molds of iron. His sons Eugene and Louis became part of the business in 1892, incorporating as V. Clad & Sons in 1896.

Thomas Mills and his brother George came to Philadelphia from Melrose, Scotland in 1864. Like Clad, they produced cooking and candy-making equipment. However, Thos. Mills & Bro. used composition, an alloy of tin and zinc for their clear toy candy molds. They also created pattern molds of brass or bronze, which were used to create the candy molds. Candy molds were made in two tightly-fitting halves, generally bearing the maker's name and sometimes a patent number. At one point, demand was high enough that Mills hired Clad to make candy molds of composition, which may bear both company names, one on each side of the mold. Mills sold its molds in sets of fifty, with each mold making one or more clear toy candies, depending on the size of the candy to be made. Leonhard Schulze and Karl Hohnstock were two of the mold designers who worked for Mills before it closed in 1946.

Other American mold manufacturers include Thos. J. Andress & Co., Philadelphia, who made molds for the Centennial in 1876; Crandall & Godley of New York; and Kiddie Kandie. Around 1990, the John Wright Company made some small molds with non-stick coating. Before the death of its owner, Nancy Fasolt, in 2015, Cake and Kandy Emporium of East Petersburg, Pennsylvania made reproduction molds.

In Canada, J. Therien of Montreal and Fletcher Manufacturing in Toronto made molds. Molds were manufactured by G. Lieb in Stuttgart, Germany between 1868 and 1960.

During World War II, many candy molds were melted down as scrap metal.

== See also ==
- Barley sugar
- Shane Confectionery
- Regennas Candy Shop
