= Barley sugar =

Boiled sweet made from barley

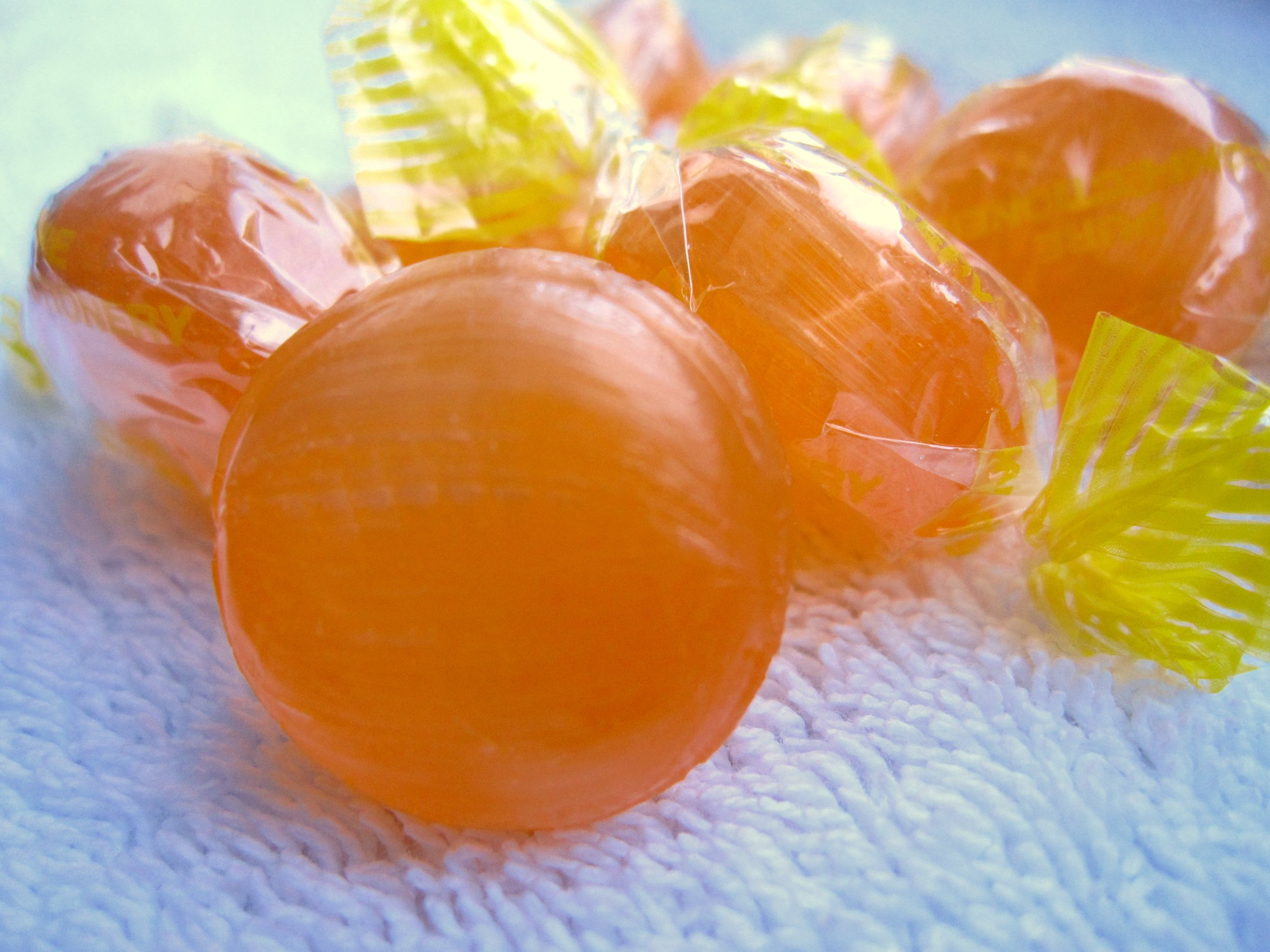
Barley sugar sweets

Barley sugar (or barley sugar candy) is a traditional variety of boiled sweet (hard candy), often yellow or orange in colour, which is usually made with barley water, giving it a characteristic taste and colour. In Britain it is (or was) usually sold in the shape of twisted sticks. Barley sugar is very similar to clear toy candy (which traditionally is made with pure water rather than barley water) and to hard caramel candy in its texture and taste.

== Composition ==
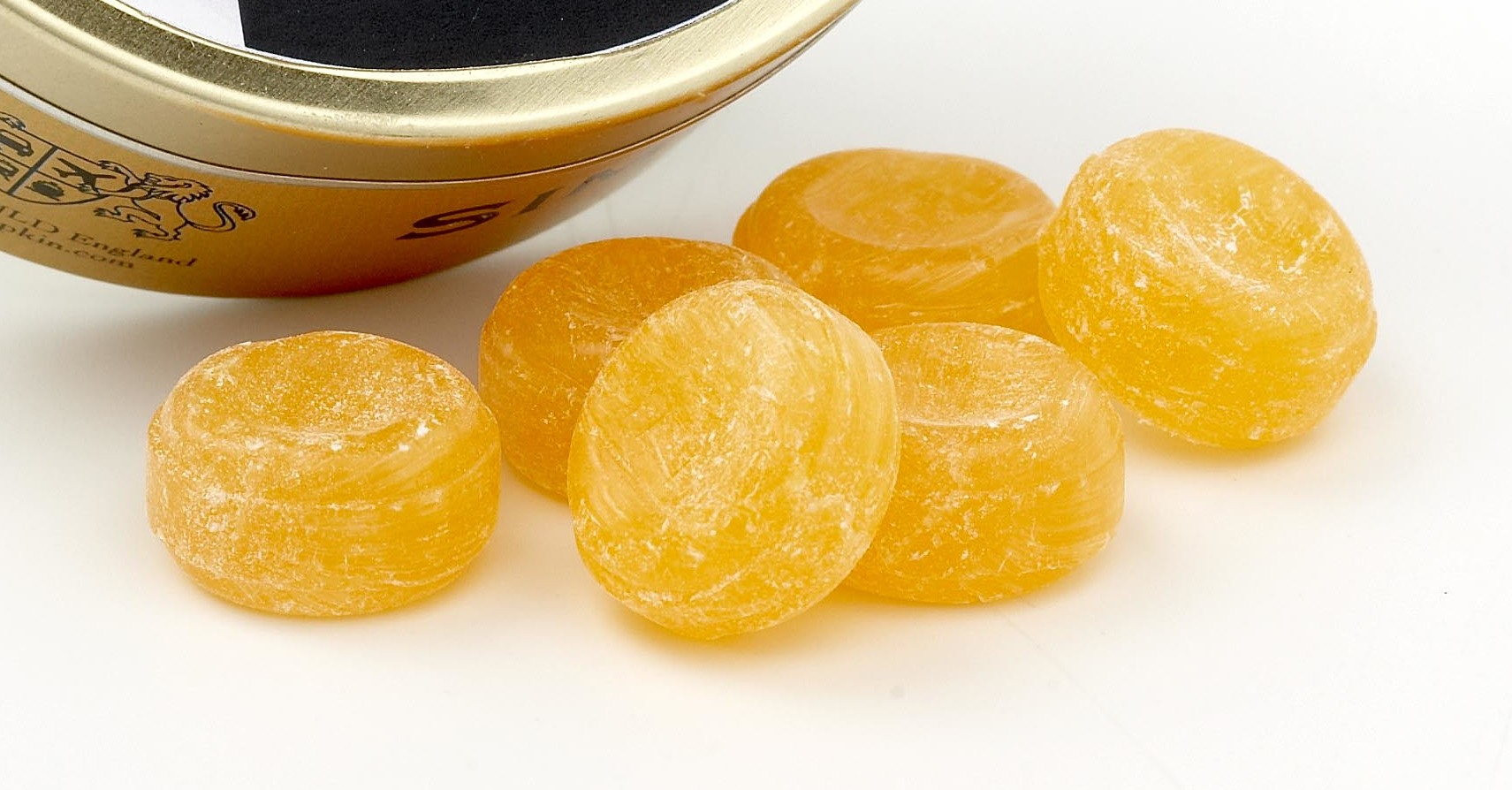
Barley sugar travel sweets

As noted by the U.S. Food and Drug Administration (FDA) there are at least two distinct methods of preparing confections which have been called "barley sugar". Heating sugar to 160 °C (320 °F) causes it to melt and then congeal, becoming opaque on the surface due to the formation of sugar crystals. Heating to a higher temperature (185 °C or 365 °F) produces a viscid liquid, which if suddenly cooled remains transparent. The name "barley sugar" therefore does not imply one specific production method or type of candy.

Candy maker Timberlake Candies further distinguishes between "barley sugar" made with cream of tartar, and "barley candy" made with corn syrup to produce a harder, clearer product.

Some modern confectioners make "barley candy" without using barley as an ingredient, preferring to use synthetic flavorings instead. The U.S. Food and Drug Administration (FDA) discourages calling a product "barley sugar" or "barley candy" unless the product actually includes barley.

== History ==
=== Sucre d'orge des Religieuses de Moret ===
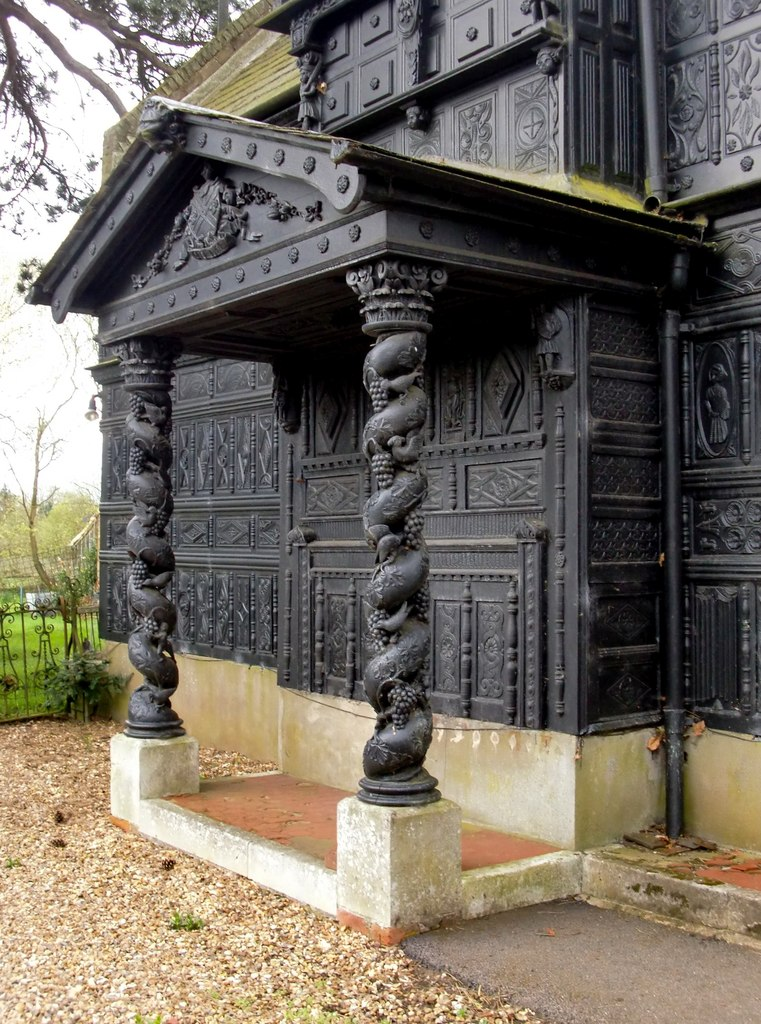
Porch with "barley sugar" columns, on the lodge at the gates of Hall Barn

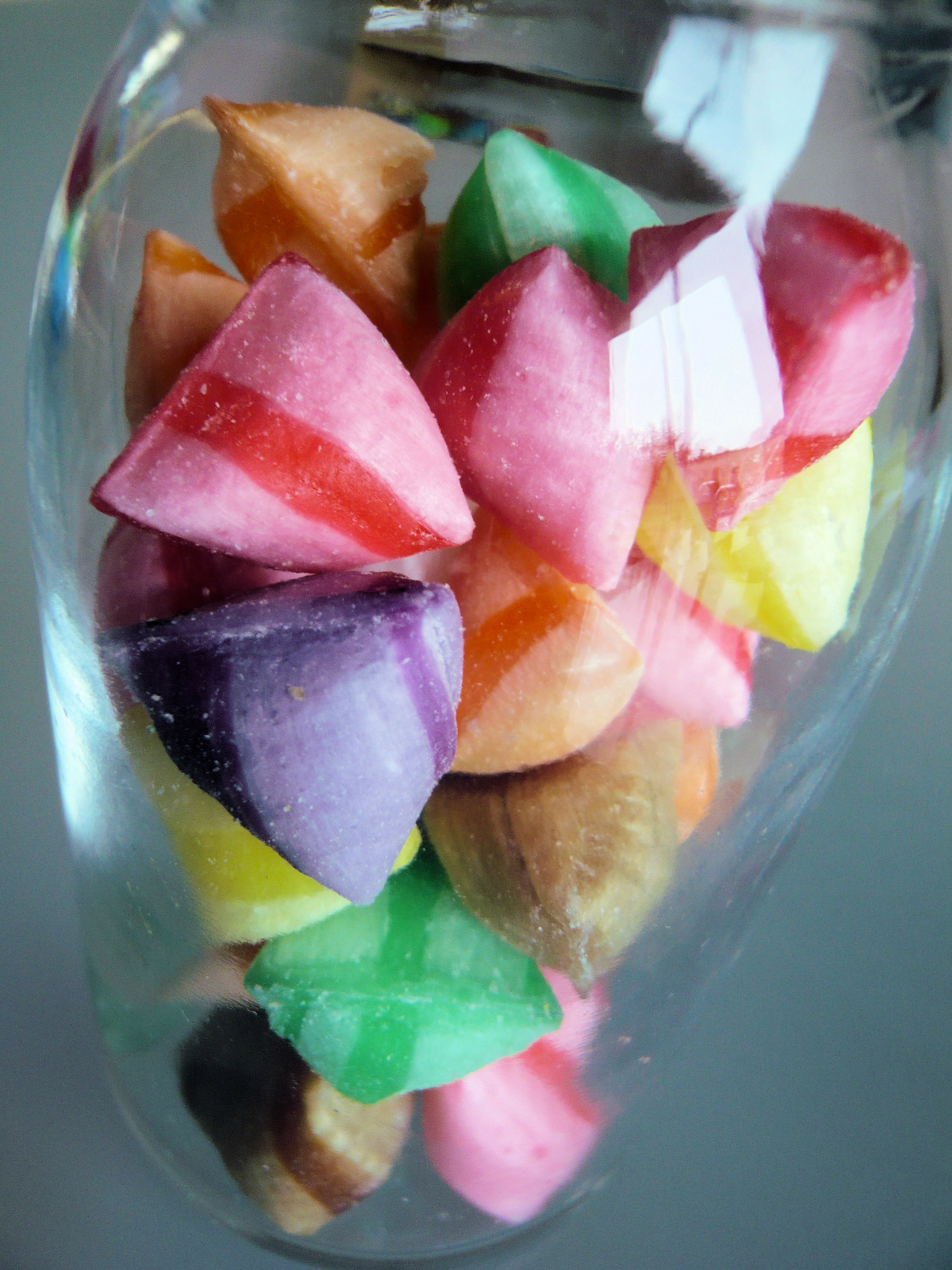
A jar of berlingots, a type of pyramidal (tetrahedral) boiled sweet traditional to the cuisine of Nantes. The barley sugar sweets of the Religieuses de Moret were often made in the same shape.

Sugar was predominantly viewed as a medicine or spice before the 18th century. The most traditional preparation of barley sugar is known as Sucre d'orge. Elizabeth Pidoux, the first Mother Superior of the Benedictine nuns at the Prieuré Perpétuel de Notre-Dame des Anges in Moret-sur-Loing, France is credited with the first recipe for barley sugar. In 1638, she combined sugar and barley water while experimenting with medicinal remedies. This 17th century barley sugar was made by boiling down refined cane sugar with barley water, and water.

Barley sugar became a popular sweetmeat with the French nobility, and was an important source of revenue for the convent and the town until the French Revolution, when the abbey was closed. The recipe was eventually passed on to a later Benedictine community that returned to Moret, the Sœurs de la Charité. Production began again in 1853, and continued until the dispersal of that religious community in the 1970s.

In 1970, the recipe for Sucre d'orge des Religieuses de Moret was entrusted to confectioner Jean Rousseau by Sister Marie-André. Rousseau and his family worked to maintain interest in its traditional production. Le Musée du Sucre d'Orge, the only known barley sugar museum, was established as a family museum in 1995 to memorialize the history of barley sugar in Moret-sur-Loing. Since 2012, it has been managed by the Municipal Council of Moret-on-Loing. In 1997, the Rousseaus organized the Confrérie du Sucre d'Orge des Religieuses de Moret sur Loing, a non-religious society to support the making of the traditional candy. The Rousseau family continued to manufacture the candy until 2012. As of 2012, the right to manufacture Sucre d'Orge des Religieuses de Moret was transferred to Des Lis Chocolat of Nemours.

Sucre d'Orge des Religieuses de Moret was often sold as boxes of small tetrahedral berlingots marked with a heart, cross and the letters "RM", for Religious of Moret. This type of barley sugar was also made into small spiral sticks. The name is therefore sometimes used for the Solomonic column in architecture, and twisted legs and spindles in furniture, stair bannisters and other uses.

=== National tastes ===
The 18th and 19th centuries were marked by the rise of industrialization and the increasing use of sugar beets rather than sugar cane. France and England were in conflict not only militarily but also economically, as Napoleon supported the introduction of sugar beets and challenged Britain's dominance in sugar cane. Scottish sugar-refiners were competing with those in England. Sugar was culturally transformed from a luxury good to a ubiquitous ingredient.

By the 1860s, national tastes in candy were changing. Henry Weatherley, author of A treatise on the art of boiling sugar, remarked that he found far fewer purveyors of boiled sugar sweets in Paris than he had seen thirty years before. In London, barley sugar had been "one of the oldest sweets made; this and acid drops were formerly the only boiled sweets that the old city houses made". Seeing barley sugar being made at Tringhams on Holborn-hill had once been a "great attraction", but the old favorites had lessened in popularity.

In England, traditional barley sugar was replaced by an array of new sugar candies using a wide variety of flavors. The term "barley sugar" become increasingly genericized and included many similar types of sugar candy. Sugar candies were also popular in Germany, and recipes traveled to North America with English, Scottish and German settlers.

=== Molded barley sugar ===
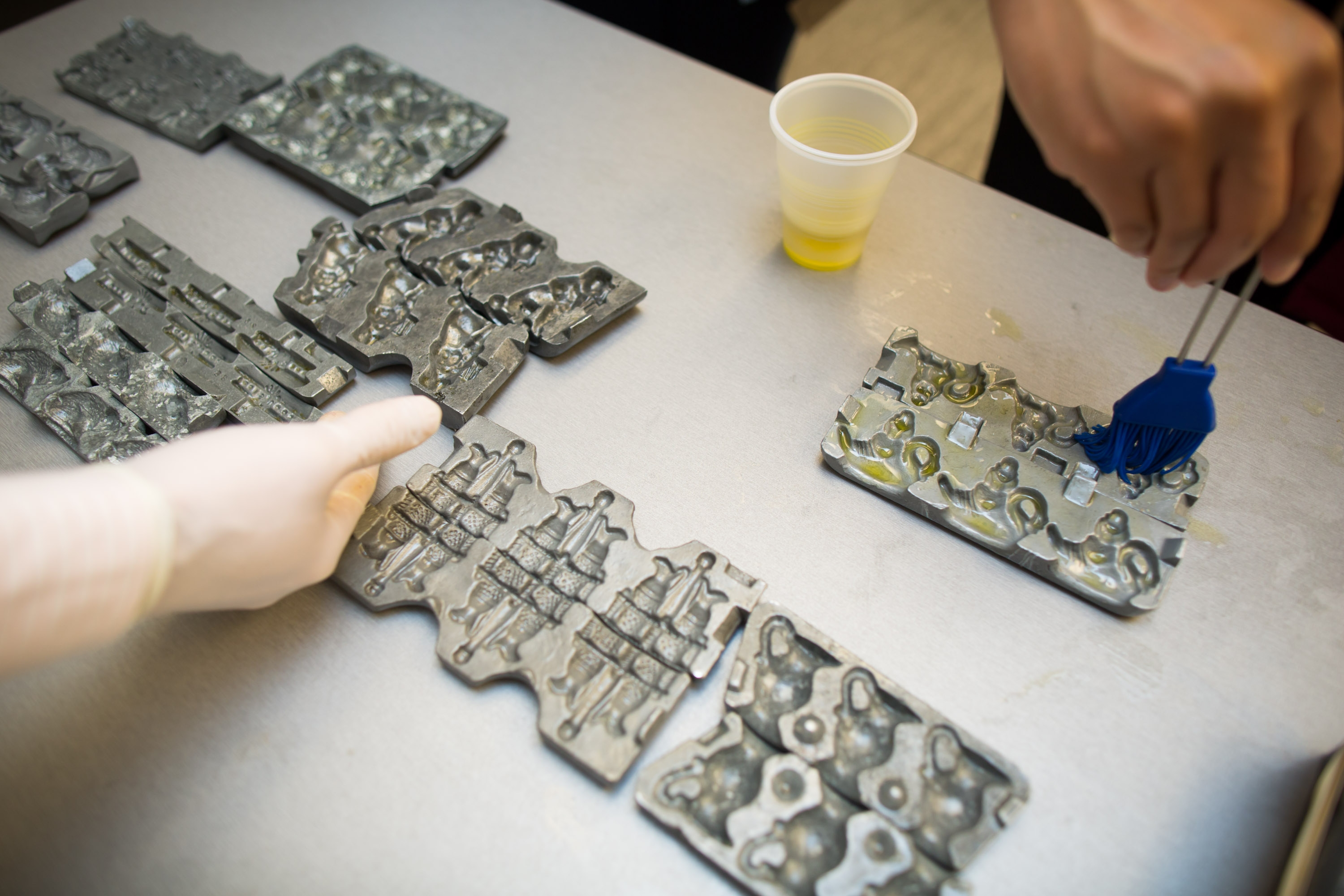
Preparing candy molds

During the 18th century metal molds began to be used to create shaped candies, which became known both as barley sugar and as clear toy candy. By the 19th century these molded candies were a popular Victorian Christmas treat in Germany, England, and some areas of North America. Pennsylvania, with a large population of German immigrants, became a center for the tradition in North America.

Dorothy Timberlake Candies of Madison, New Hampshire, made molded barley candies with a variety of added flavorings from 1971 to 2009. Their collection of antique candy molds included more than 13,000 shapes.

=== Recipes ===
The cooks and confectioners dictionary; or, The accomplish'd housewifes companion (1723) gives a recipe for barley sugar that includes barley as an ingredient.

BOIL Barley in Water, strain it through a Hair Sieve, then put the Decoction into clarified Sugar brought to a Caramel height, or the last Degree of Boiling: Then take it off the Fire, and let the Boiling settle; then pour it upon a Marble-stone rubb'd with the Oil of Olives: When it cools, and begins to grow hard, cut it into Pieces, and roll it into Lengths as you please.

By the 1800s, recipes for "barley-sugar" could be found in many confectionery cookbooks, but most of these recipes do not include barley as an ingredient. In 1829, the Italian Confectioner describes the making of "barley-sugar" twists, tablets and drops using sugar, lemon, vinegar or alum, and "any essence you choose". An 1850 recipe uses sugar, water and lemon. An 1880 recipe uses sugar, water, and egg white. Isabella Beeton's Book of Household Management (1861) uses egg white and suggests the addition of saffron for colouring. A modern recipe uses sugar, water, lemon and cream of tartar.

A cookbook published in Chicago in 1883 includes a recipe specifically for molded candy: "222. Candy for Christmas Toys, Etc." An 1818 recipe for clear toy candy has been republished.

== See also ==
- Candy stick
- Polkagris (another candy often presented as a hooked stick)
