= Shane Confectionery =

American confectioner in Philadelphia

External videos
- “Shane Confectionery”, Martha Stewart Living

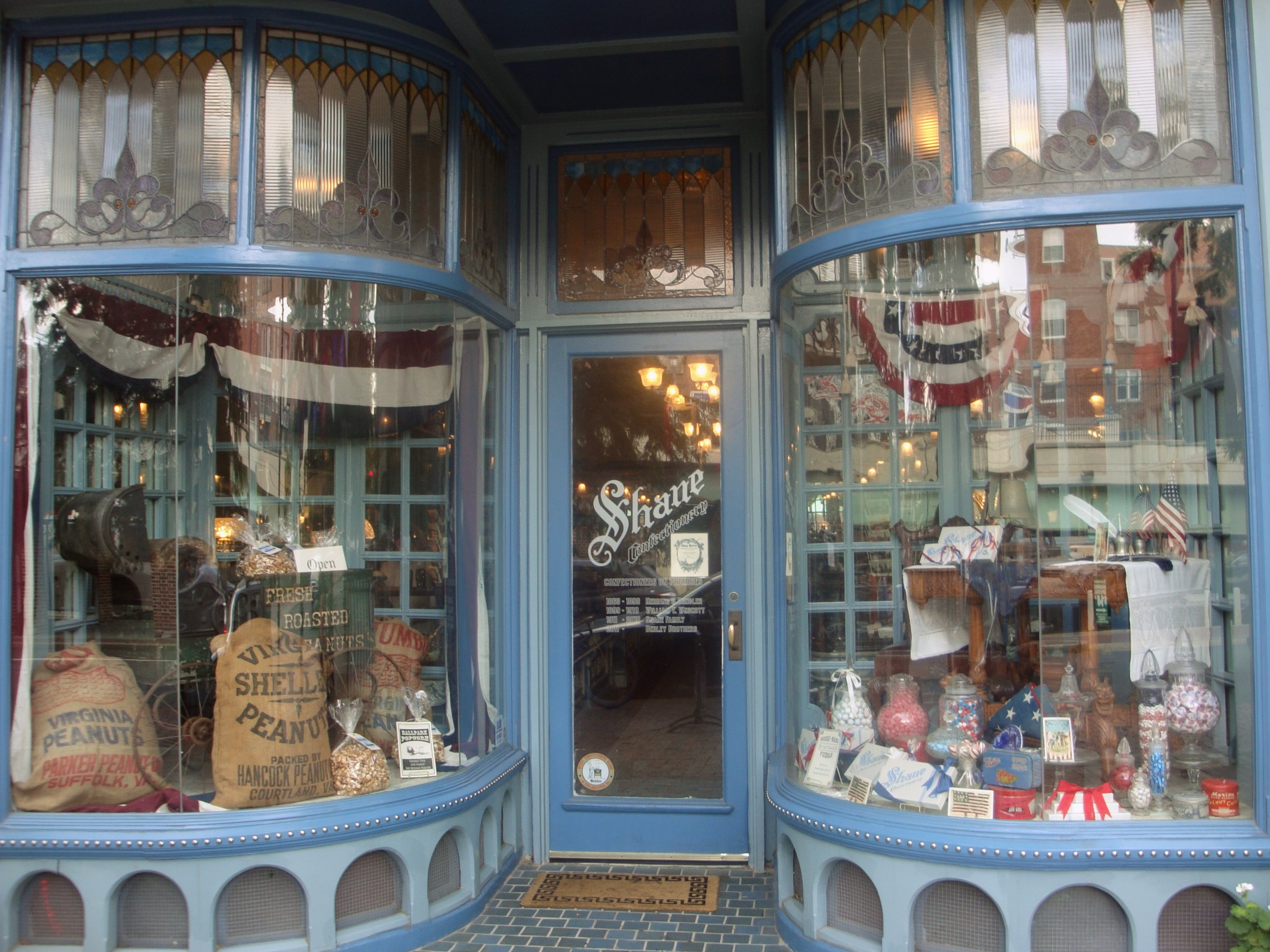
Exterior, Shane Confectionery in Philadelphia

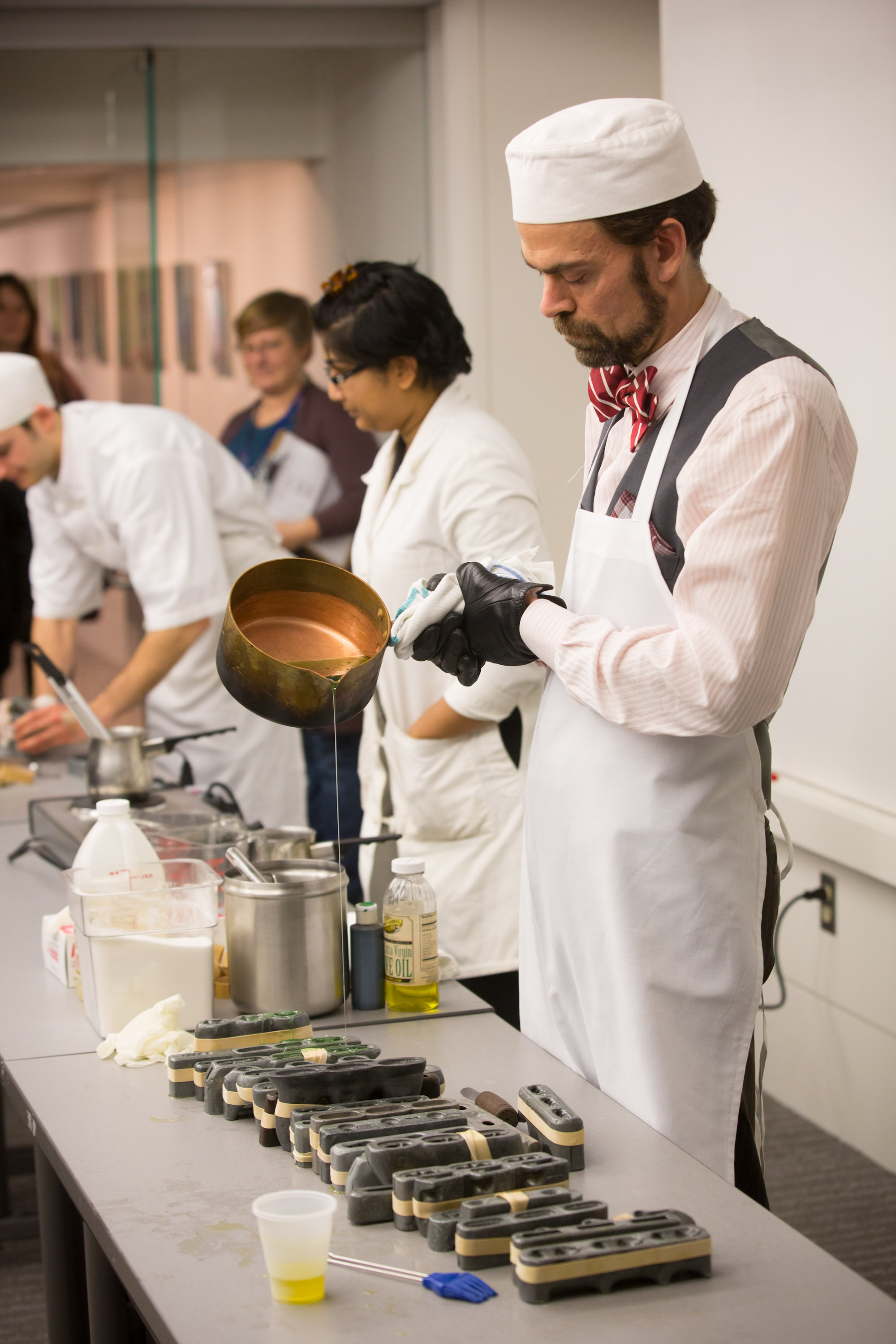
Ryan Berley, co-owner of Shane Confectionery and the Franklin Fountain, pouring solution into molds to make clear toy candy

Shane Confectionery is an American candy shop and candy producer, located at 110 Market Street in Philadelphia, Pennsylvania. Currently owned by Ryan and Eric Berley, it is considered by some to be the longest-running confectionery business in the United States even though that title is better attributed to Ye Olde Pepper Candy Companie in Salem, Massachusetts. The original confectionery business at the location opened in 1863. They are known for making traditional specialties including previous owner Edward Shane's buttercream chocolates and Pennsylvania clear toy candy.

== History ==
Since 1863, candy and candy-making materials have been made or sold in the premises at 110 Market Street (originally known as the High Street), in Philadelphia, Pennsylvania. The location was part of an active candy-making industry that grew up around the sugar trade. In 1910, Philadelphia was home to as many as 1,200 confectioneries.

Members of the Herring candy-making family operated several properties in the area beginning in the 1840s. Samuel L. Herring opened a wholesale confectionery supply business at 112 Market in the 1850s, expanding to 110 Market Street in 1863. After the American Civil War, his son Benjamin W. Herring took over the business. He eventually went into partnership with one of his father's employees, confectioner Daniel S. Dengler. The partners sold wholesale confectionery goods at 110 Market until Benjamin Herring died.

Daniel S. Dengler and his son, Frank Dengler, continued to operate the business until 1899, when they sold the building to William T. Wescott. In 1910, Wescott moved to New Jersey, selling the business to Edward R. Shane. The family business was taken over by Edward's son Barry Shane in 1983. The Shane family operated the location as a retail business for the next 99 years.

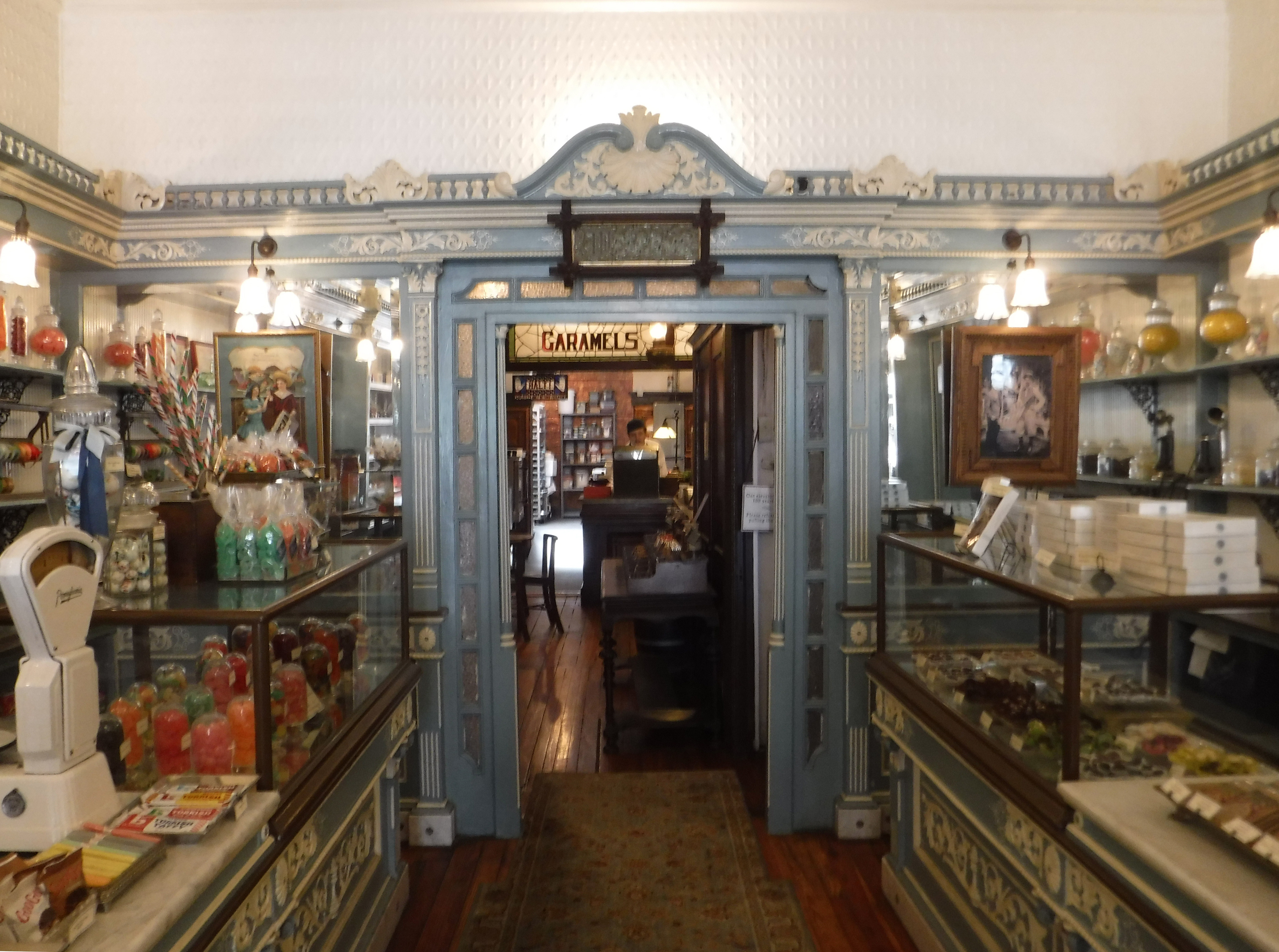
Shane Confectionery interior, 2018

In 2010, the business was bought by brothers Ryan and Eric Berley. They chose to retain the "Shane Confectionery" name. They have restored the building and its contents, including vintage features such as the scales and the cash register. They use restored original machinery and traditional artisanal confectionery recipes to make many of the sweets they sell. For example, their cast-iron buttercream churn was used in the 1920s by Edward Shane. The confectionery store is only a few doors away from their other restored business, a vintage ice-cream shop called the Franklin Fountain.

== Specialties ==
Shane Confectionery makes traditional specialties including wrapped buttercream chocolates and clear toy candy for Christmas and Easter.

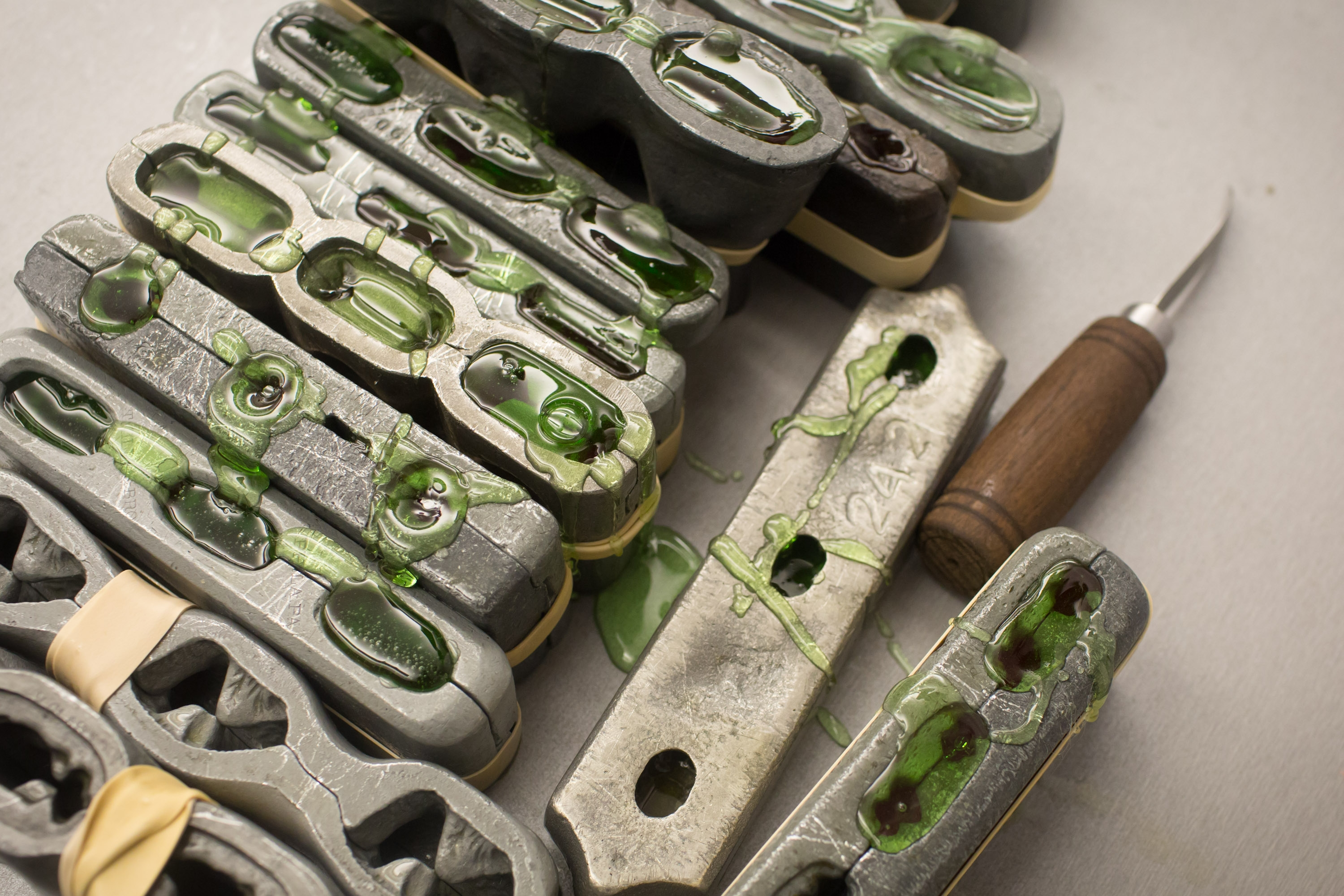

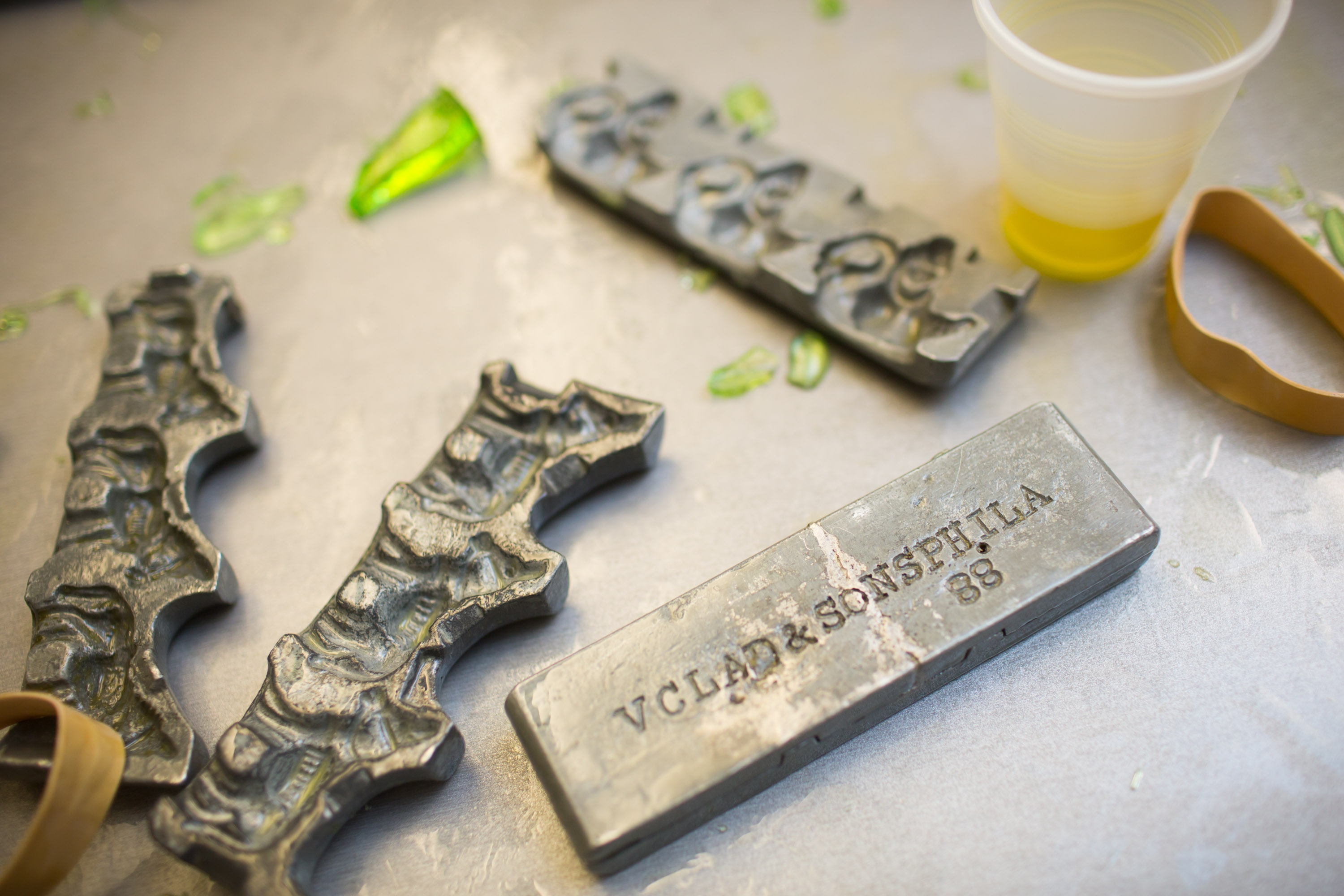

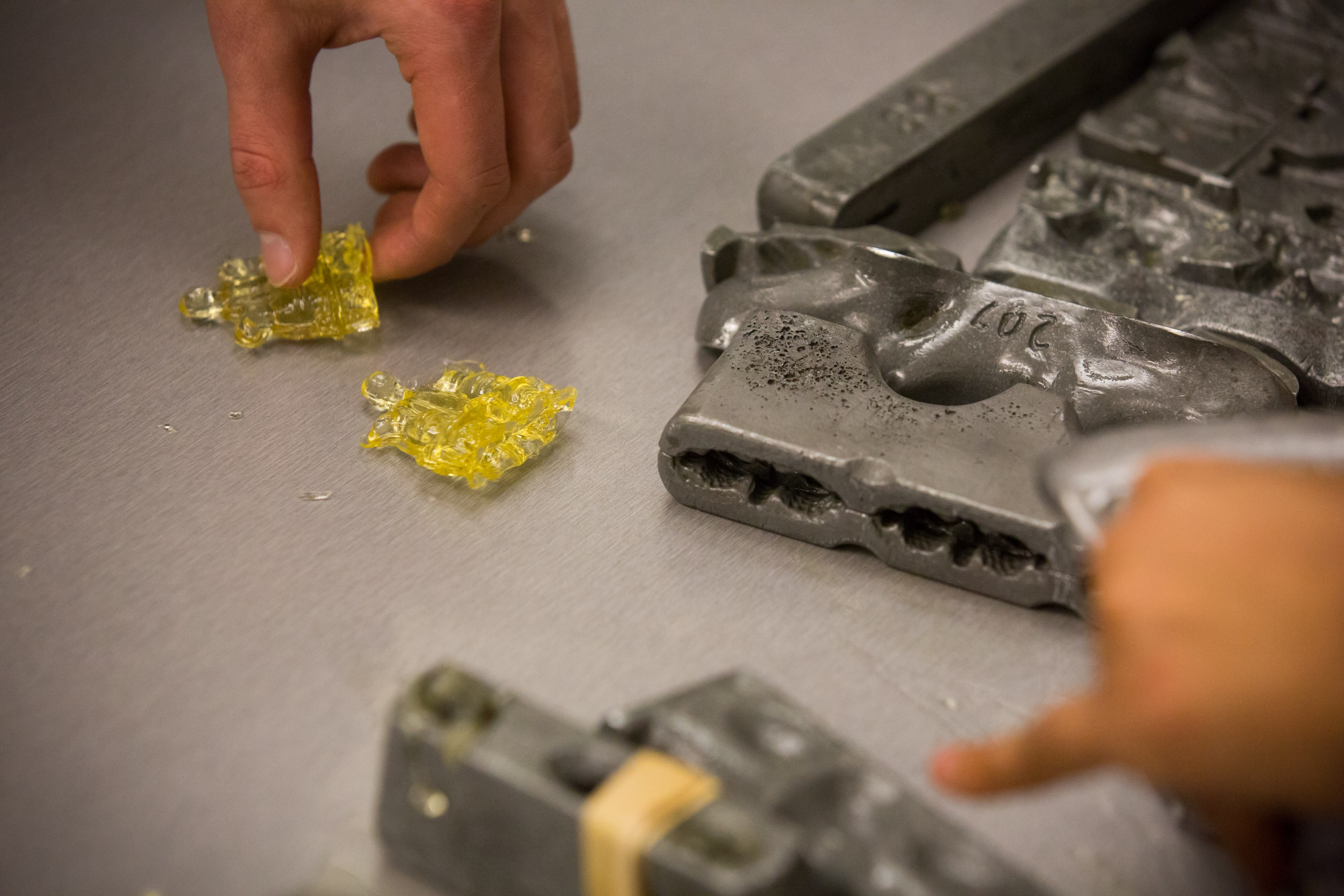

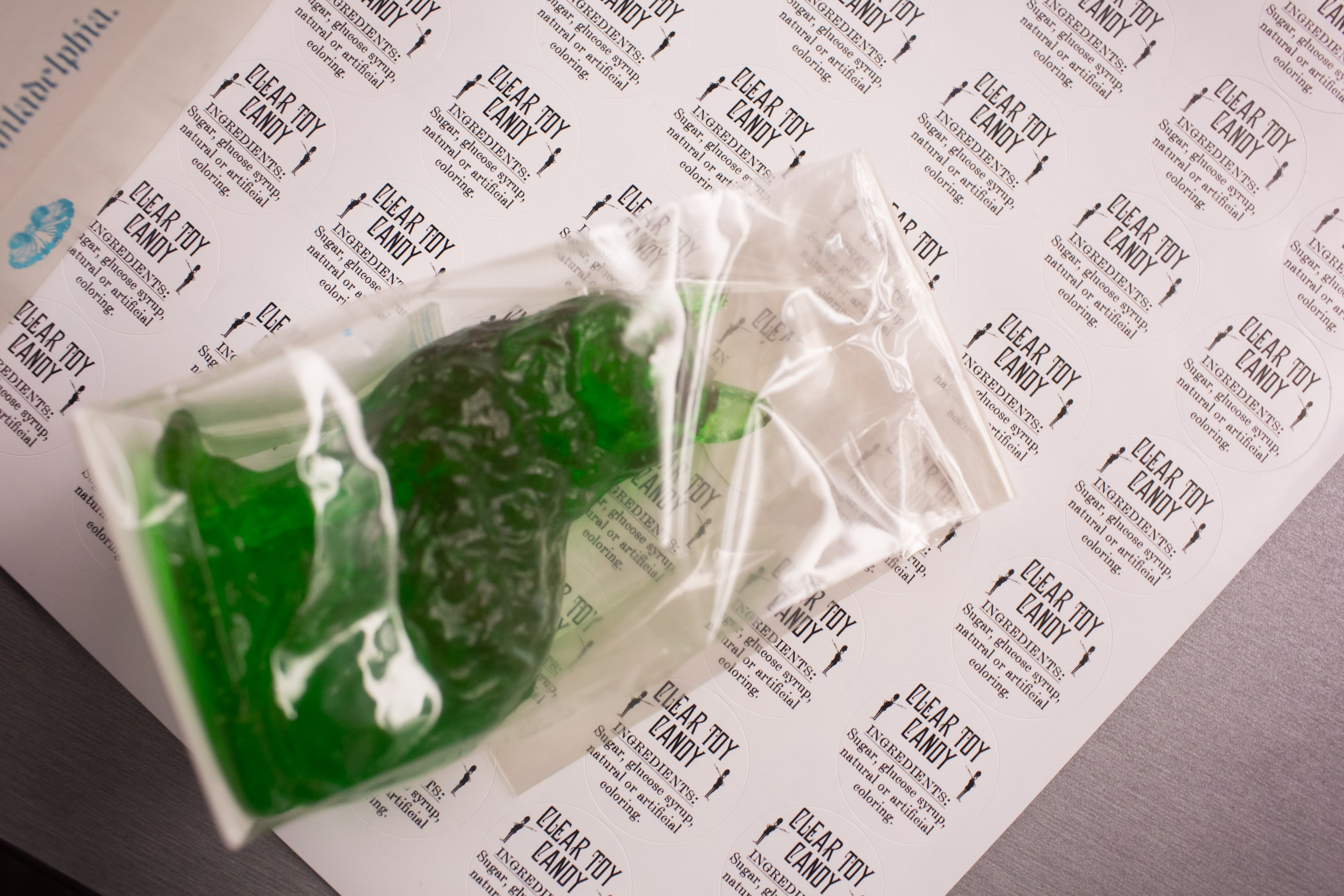
