= Regennas Candy Shop =

Candy shop in Myerstown, Pennsylvania

Regennas Candy Shop is a historic candy-making shop at 10 Maple lane in Myerstown, Pennsylvania. It was first established in Philadelphia in 1894 as C. Fred Regennas & Sons at 1330 North 19th Street, and then, opened in Lititz in Lancaster County, Pennsylvania in 1910 before being moved to its current location. Regennas makes clear toy and other old-fashioned candy varieties.

Regennas Candy Shop uses 150 original clear toy molds. The clear toys are sold as individual pieces or on a stick, and are made in amber, red, and green colors. Special Christmas and Easter molds are used for seasonal clear toys.
