= Startup Candy Factory =

Historic building in Provo

- The Startup Candy Factory
- U.S. National Register of Historic Places
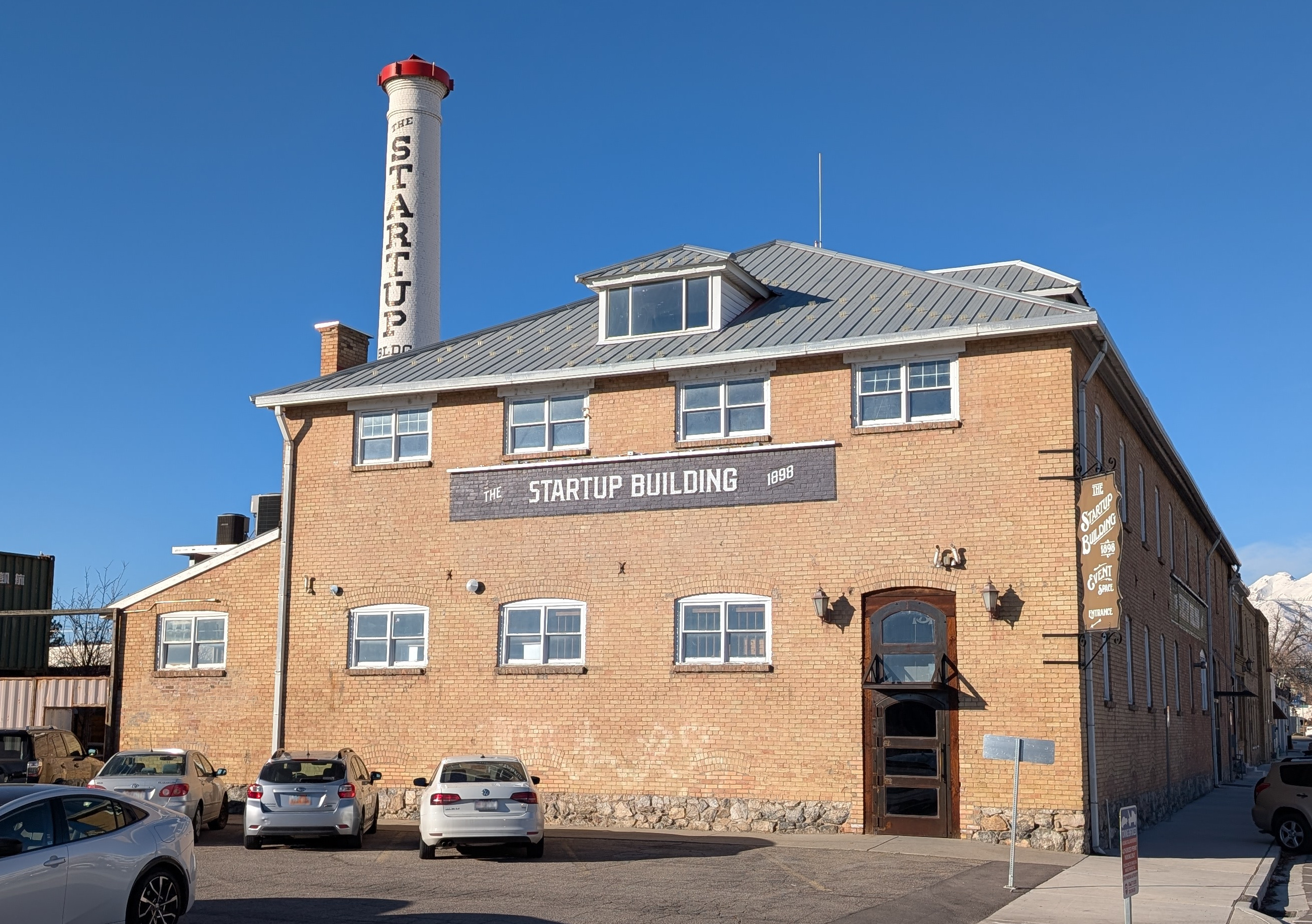
- Startup Building (January 2025)

- Location within Utah
- Interactive map showing the location of the Startup Building
- Location: 534 South 100 West; Provo, Utah; United States
- Coordinates: 40°13′34″N 111°39′35″W
- Area: less than one acre
- Built: 1900
- Built by: William Startup
- Architectural style: Late Victorian
- NRHP reference No.: 83003973
- Added to NRHP: October 28, 1983

The Startup Candy Factory is a historic building in Provo, Utah. The building retains its name from its original business, the Startup Candy Company, named after the family that ran the business and built the factory and warehouse. The family sold the old factory in the 21st century and today, it is used as a reception venue while the offices are let out to various businesses.

The two-story building is a late Victorian style mix between a warehouse and a light commercial style. Since it was built, a number of additions and changes have been which significantly altered the building's appearance. It has been a nationally recognized historic place since 1983.

== History ==
=== The Startup Family ===
William Daw Startup grew up making candy with his father in the basement of their home in Widcombe, England. The family had wanted to come to America and even made a product they called "American Cough Candy". However, William was the only one to emigrate, doing so at the behest of Hagar Hick. The two left for America in 1869 and wed in November of that year in the Endowment House.

Startup brought a number of candy-making tools with him overseas. In 1874, William and Hagar moved down to Provo and built a factory beside their home at and began producing candy in earnest, which included some of the first candy bars in America.

In 1878, William was struck by a limestone cooling slab, breaking a blood vessel and causing his death 10 days later on January 28th. His widow continued to operate the business while raising their four small children over the next ten years. By 1892, the Startup Candy Company had become the third best wholesale manufacturing company in all of Utah.

In 1895, the three Startup sons took ownership of the company. George Startup was made president, Harry Walter the vice president, and William J. the treasurer. The business's success began in earnest in the early 20th century, and they were able to expand throughout the western states and construct the Startup Candy Factory in 1900. At its peak, their business employed 175 workers. Thanks to their success, they were the first factory in Utah to give profit-sharing bonuses to employees.

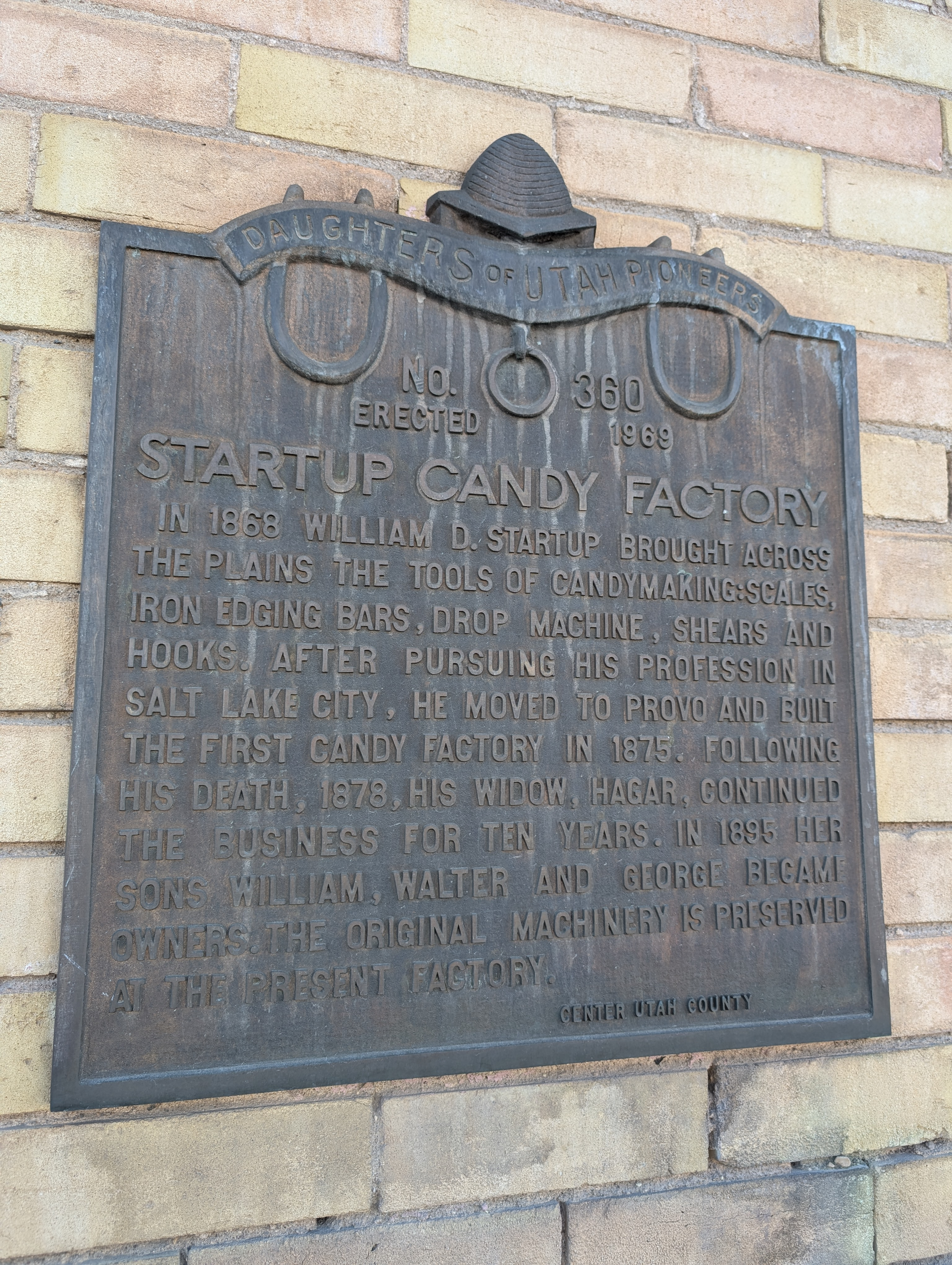
A plaque donated in 1969 by the Daughters of Utah Pioneers briefly explaining the history of the Startup Building.

=== Changing Ownership ===
George Startup sold his share of the family business to Harry Walter in early 1929. Confection sales continued to grow until the Great Depression started later that same year. Around this time, Harry Walter also bought out William's share. Not long after, he would lose the factory to foreclosure. The building would remain largely unsold until he was able to buy the factory's north half in 1938, where the printers were. Though the company's workspace was greatly reduced compared to their prime, Startup Candy was able to resume operations. The southern portion of the factory, however, continued to remain unused over the next several decades.

Around this time, Hide & Fur, a neighboring business, started using the southern portion of the building to store wool. Then, in 1978, Anderson and York Building Supplies bought the unoccupied portion of the factory and began using it as a lumber and hardware store. During the transition, the new owners considered tearing down the old building only to be discouraged by the locals. In the 1990s, the business was sold and converted to a cabinet manufacturing factory.

In 2012, the current owner, Tom Taylor, bought the building and repurposed the space to be used as office space and as an event venue. In 2018, Startup Candy Company sold its last portion of the factory to Justin Williams. Their business relocated to American Fork, where it continues to operate to this day.

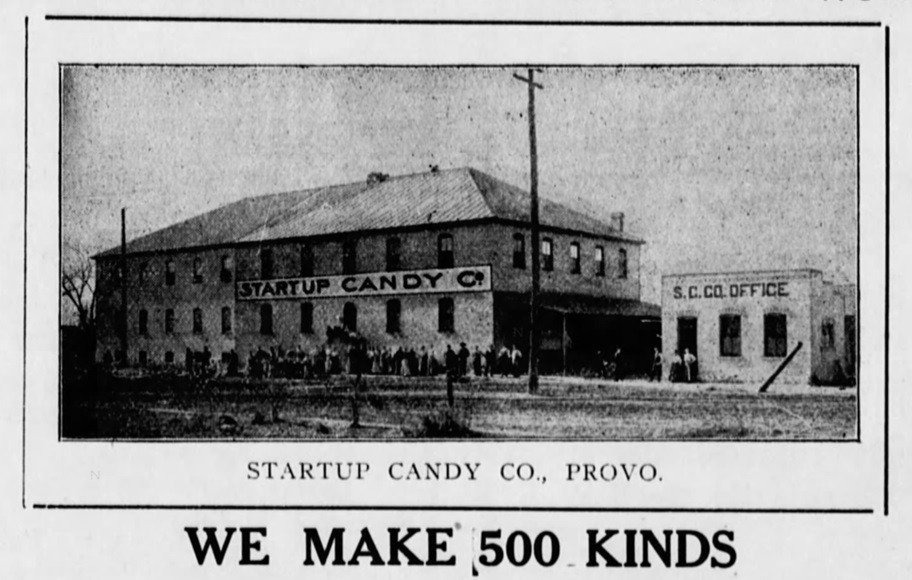
Photo of the Startup Factory used in a 1907 advertisement

== Structure ==
The building has two and a half stories and a basement. Its style is a mix between a warehouse and light commercial. The facade is asymmetrical. The southern portion has no decorative elements outside. Its middle section has a Roman arched door bay and a stone belt course, as well as recessed brick panels encasing the windows and door bays. The northern section has a corbled brick course along the second level and stringcourses.

The offices and printing plant were built north of the factory in 1905. They were built detached from the factory proper and were originally only one story. At some point before 1925, a second story was built over the offices, connecting it to the factory and unifying all the additions.

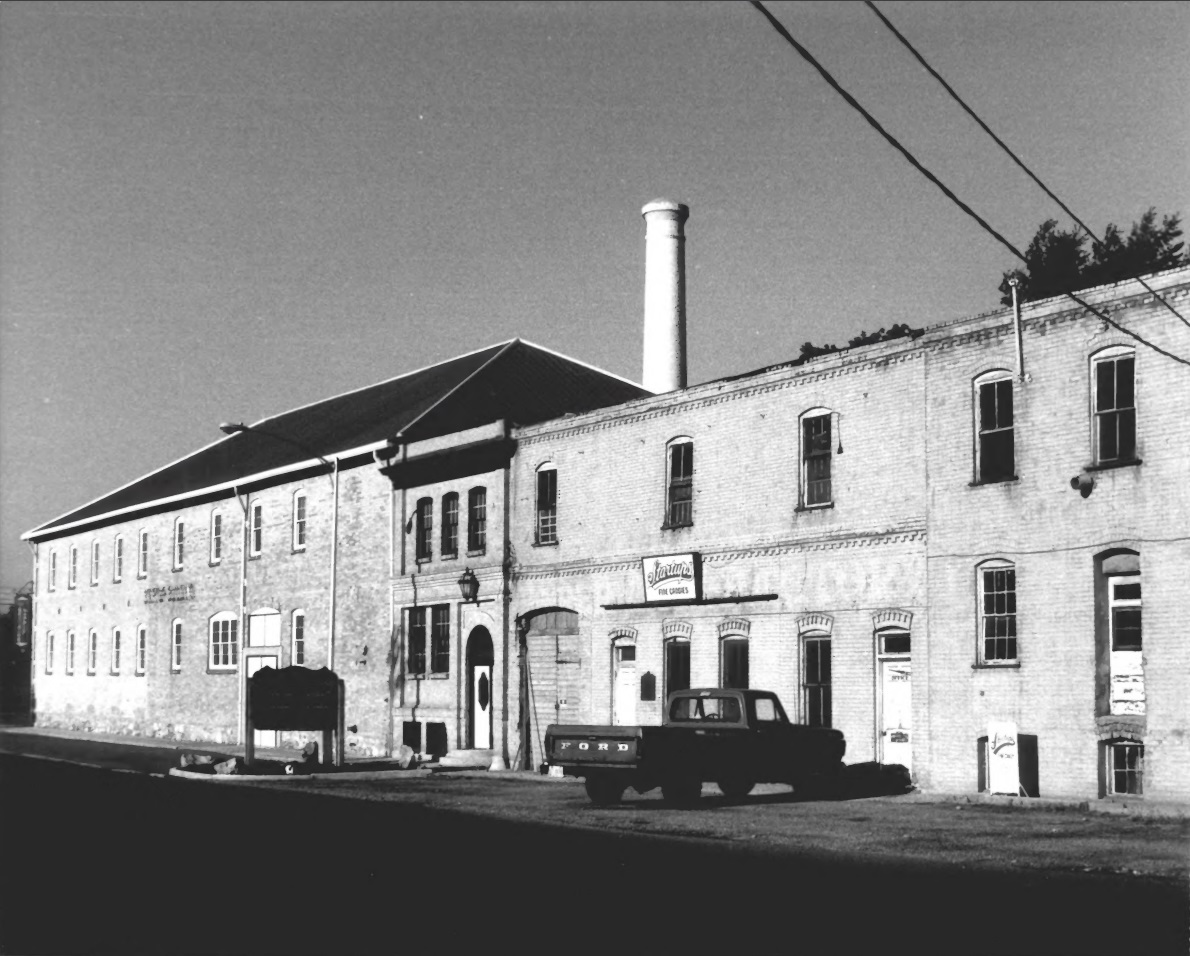
East facade (1983)

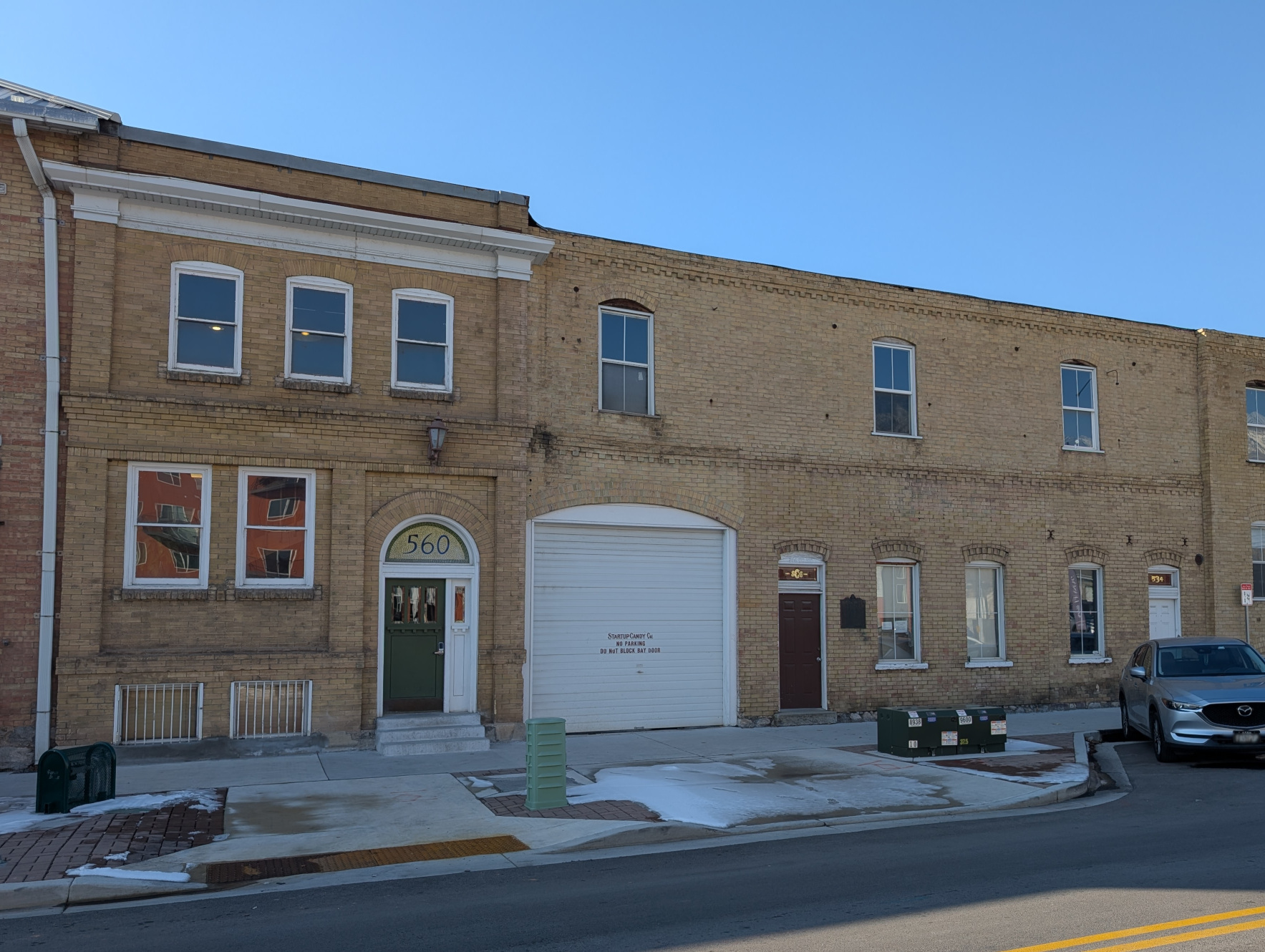
North half of the eastern facade (2025)

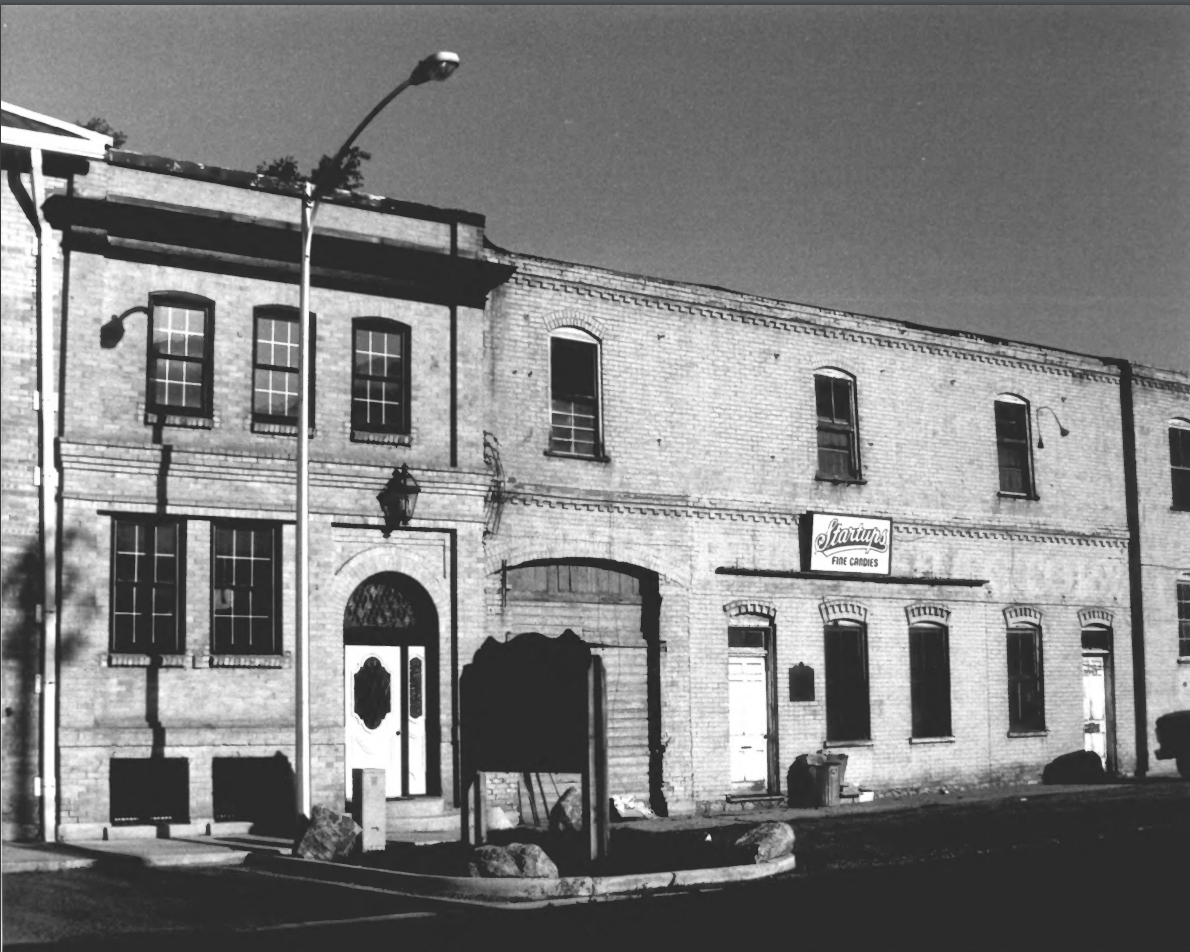
North half of the eastern facade (1983)

== See also ==
- National Register of Historic Places listings in Utah County, Utah

== Additional reading ==
- 2002. "Historic Provo" Provo City Landmarks Commission.
- Hinckley, Ann. “Utah Historic Sites Inventory Form.” Utah Historical Society. July 1975.
- Hartman, Cheryl. National Park Service. "National Register of Historic Places Inventory -- Nomination Form." May 1983.
