= William James and Edna Cordner House =

Historic house in Utah, United States

- U.S. National Register of Historic Places
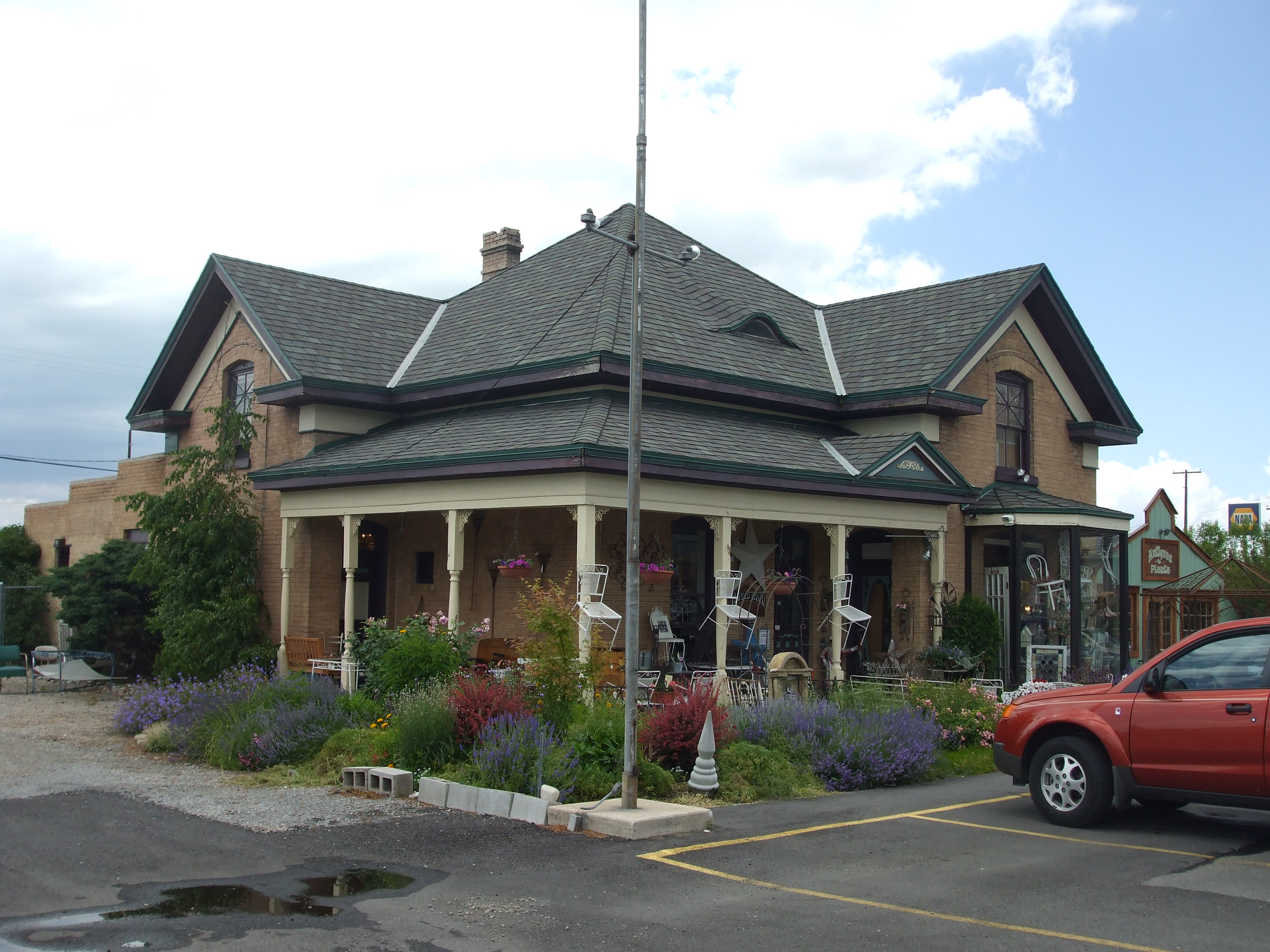

- Location within Utah Location within the United States
- Location: 440 S. State St., Orem, Utah
- Coordinates: 40°17′21″N 111°41′28″W
- Area: 1.1 acres (0.45 ha)
- Built: c.1898
- Built by: William Cordner
- Architectural style: Late Victorian
- MPS: Orem, Utah MPS
- NRHP reference No.: 98000647
- Added to NRHP: June 11, 1998

The William James and Edna Cordner House at 440 S. State St. in Orem, Utah was built c.1898. It has also been known as Planted Earth. It was listed on the National Register of Historic Places (NRHP) in 1998.

William Cordner, who built the house, was a fruit grower.

== See also ==
- Cordner–Calder House, also built by William Cordner, also in Orem and NRHP-listed
- Alexander and Nellie P. Cordner House, also in Orem and NRHP-listed
