= Alexander and Nellie P. Cordner House =

Historic house in Utah, United States

- U.S. National Register of Historic Places
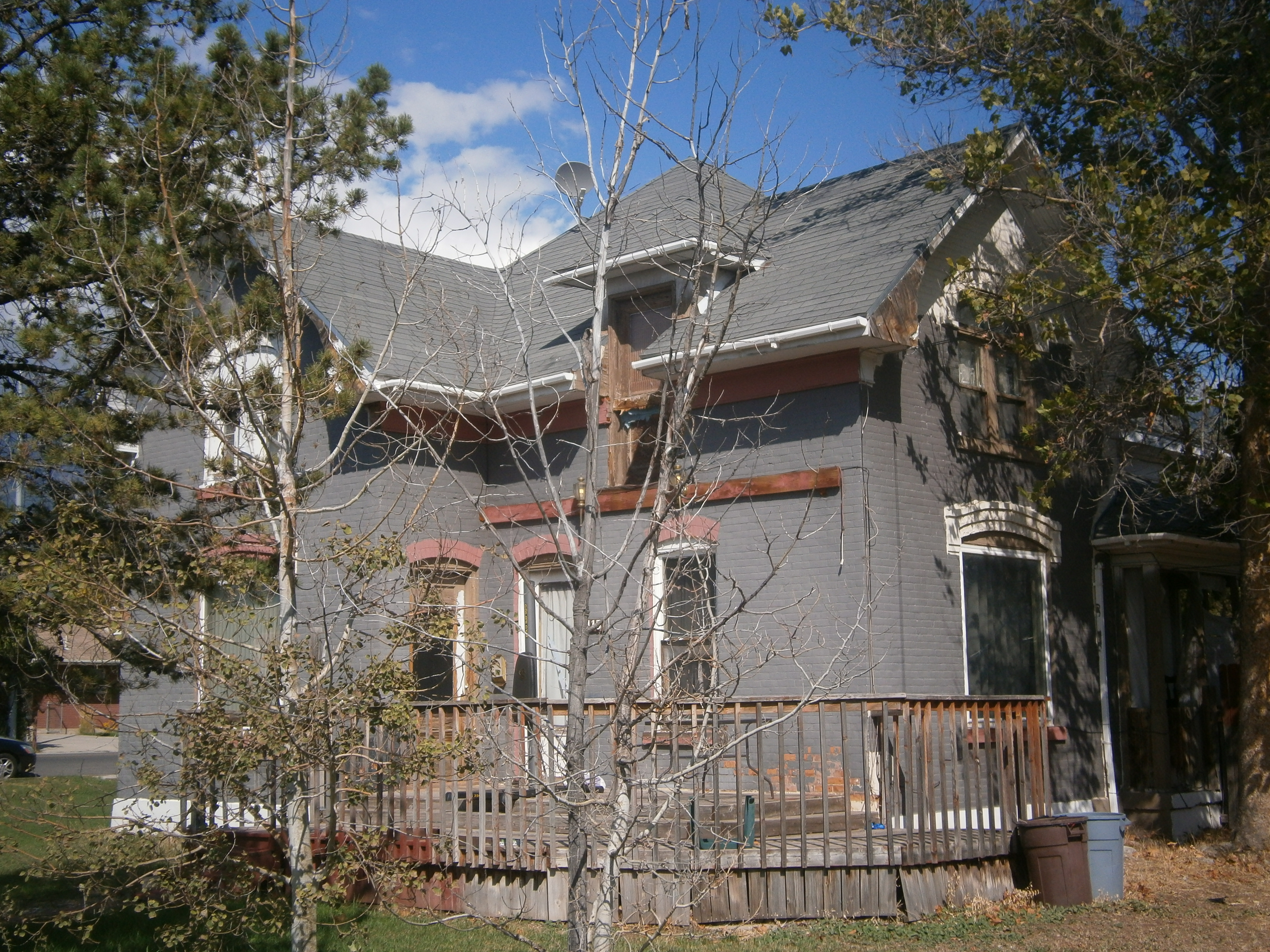

- Location within Utah Location within the United States
- Location: 415 S. 400 E., Orem, Utah
- Coordinates: 40°17′22″N 111°41′6″W
- Area: 0.3 acres (0.12 ha)
- Built: 1909
- Built by: Cordner, Alexander
- Architectural style: Late Victorian
- MPS: Orem, Utah MPS
- NRHP reference No.: 98000649
- Added to NRHP: June 11, 1998

The Alexander and Nellie P. Cordner House is a historic Victorian Eclectic house located at 415 S. 400 E. in Orem, Utah. Built in 1909, the 1 1/2-story brick house has projecting bays and an asymmetrical facade. It was listed on the National Register of Historic Places in 1998.

== See also ==
- Cordner–Calder House, also in Orem and NRHP-listed
- William James and Edna Cordner House, also in Orem and NRHP-listed
- National Register of Historic Places listings in Utah County, Utah
