= Cordner–Calder House =

Historic house in Utah, United States

- U.S. National Register of Historic Places
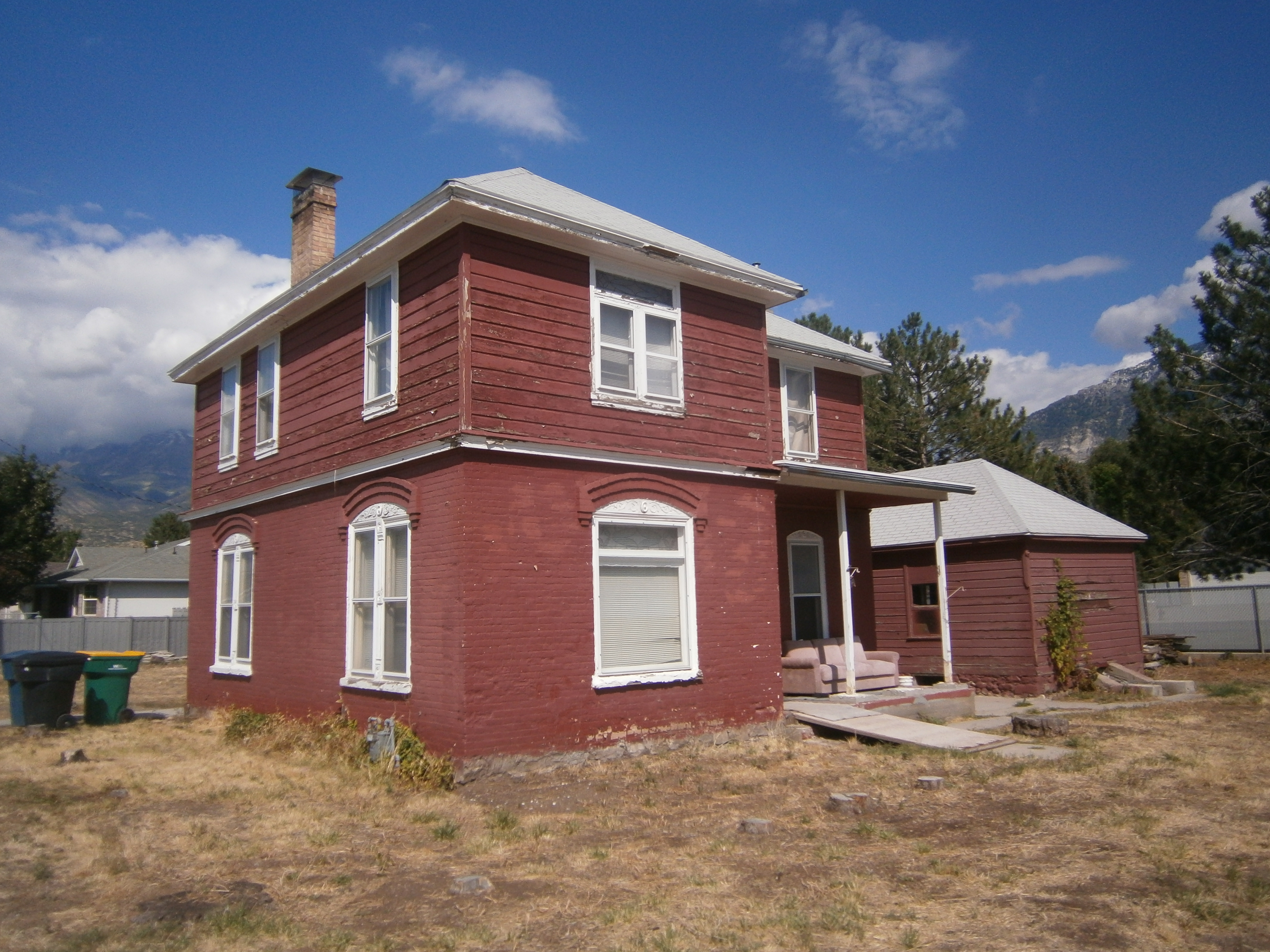

- Location within Utah Location within the United States
- Location: 305 S. 900 E., Orem, Utah
- Coordinates: 40°17′29″N 111°40′22″W
- Area: 0.4 acres (0.16 ha)
- Built: 1894
- Built by: Cordner, William
- Architectural style: Late Victorian
- MPS: Orem, Utah MPS
- NRHP reference No.: 98000648
- Added to NRHP: June 11, 1998

The Cordner–Calder House at 305 S. 900 E. in Orem, Utah is a Victorian-style house which was built in 1894 by William Cordner and was expanded around 1910. The home is associated with two families, the Cordners and the Calders, both of which were "prominent fruit growers on the Provo Bench" whose "participation and influence in the growth of Orem is reflected in this house".

It was built on what was once part of a 160 acres (65 ha) tract patented by Irish immigrant Thomas Cordner in 1886. After Thomas' death, his fourth son, William, was deeded the 10 acre section portion of the land having the house in 1896 or 1902. It was later home of the Calders for many years.

It was listed on the National Register of Historic Places in 1998. The listing included two contributing buildings: the house and a wash-house/cellar building behind.

== See also ==
- William James and Edna Cordner House, also in Orem and NRHP-listed
- Alexander and Nellie P. Cordner House, also in Orem and NRHP-listed
- National Register of Historic Places listings in Utah County, Utah
