= Utah State Route 77 =

Highway in Utah, US

State Route 77

Route information
- Maintained by UDOT
- Length: 9.069 mi (14.595 km)
- Existed: 1962–present

Major junctions
- West end: SR-147 near Benjamin
- I-15 in Springville
- East end: US 89 in Springville

Location
- Country: United States
- State: Utah

Highway system
- Utah State Highway System; Interstate; US; State; Minor; Scenic
← SR-76	→ SR-78

State Route 77 (SR-77) is a state highway in the U.S. state of Utah, running west and south from Springville across I-15 to SR-147 in rural Utah County.

== Route description ==
SR-77 begins at an intersection with SR-147 north of Benjamin. It heads north on 3200 West through Lake Shore, and after a few turns near the shore of Utah Lake, and a bridge over the Spanish Fork, ends up eastbound on 4000 South. The route enters Springville as it curves into 3900 South, crossing I-15 and becoming 400 South in that city's grid. After crossing over the Union Pacific Railroad's Provo Subdivision (ex-D&RGW), SR-77 ends at US-89 (Main Street) near downtown Springville. The entire route is within the flat Utah Valley, rich farmland that was once the bed of Lake Bonneville. In addition, the portion between I-15 and US-89 is part of the National Highway System.

== History ==
The state legislature designated State Route 228 in 1941, beginning at SR-147 west of Spanish Fork and heading northwest on Palmyra Drive via Palmyra and south on 3200 West to SR-115 at Benjamin. A new State Route 77 was created by the State Road Commission in 1962, connecting the planned I-15 to SR-1 (US-89) in Springville. The legislature deleted SR-228 in 1969, but the north–south piece became part of an extension of SR-77, along with a portion of 4000 South connecting the I-15/SR-77 interchange to former SR-228.

== Major intersections ==
The entire route is in Utah County.

Location	mi	km	Destinations	Notes
	0.000	0.000	SR-147 (W 6400 S)	
	2.917	4.694	Palmyra Drive	Former SR-228
Springville	7.154	11.513	I-15 – Salt Lake City, Las Vegas	Exit 260 on I-15
Springville	9.069	14.595	US 89 (Main Street)	
1.000 mi = 1.609 km; 1.000 km = 0.621 mi
