= Utah State Route 141 =

State highway in Utah County, Utah, United States

State Route 141

Route information
- Maintained by UDOT
- Length: 6.623 mi (10.659 km)
- Existed: 1969–present

Major junctions
- South end: US 6 in Genola
- North end: SR-147 at McBeth Corner

Location
- Country: United States
- State: Utah

Highway system
- Utah State Highway System; Interstate; US; State; Minor; Scenic
← SR-140	→ SR-142

State route 141 (SR-141) is a state highway in the U.S. state of Utah. Spanning 6.623 miles (10.659 km), it connects U.S. Route 6 in Genola with Utah State Route 147 west of Payson in Utah County.

== Route description ==
State Route 141 begins as State Street at US-6 on the south side of Genola, a small town in Utah County. From there, it travels northeast through eastern Genola, turning into Mountain Road as it leaves town and passes the Keigley quarry. Continuing northeast, the route makes its way to 5600 West, onto which it turns north and continues for about 1 mile (1.6 km) to 10400 South where the route ends and Utah State Route 147 continues north in its place.

== Major intersections ==
The entire route is in Utah County.

Location	mi	km	Destinations	Notes
Genola	0.000	0.000	US 6	Southern terminus
McBeth Corner	6.623	10.659	SR-147	Northern terminus
1.000 mi = 1.609 km; 1.000 km = 0.621 mi
