= Utah State Route 164 =

State highway in Utah, United States

State Route 164

Route information
- Maintained by UDOT
- Length: 2.744 mi (4.416 km)
- Existed: 1962–present

Major junctions
- West end: I-15 / US 6 in Utah County
- East end: SR-198 in Spanish Fork

Location
- Country: United States
- State: Utah

Highway system
- Utah State Highway System; Interstate; US; State; Minor; Scenic
← US 163	→ SR-165

State Route 164 (SR-164) is a state highway in the U.S. state of Utah. Spanning 2.7 miles (4.3 km), it connects State Route 198 (Main Street) with Interstate 15 south of Spanish Fork in Utah County.

== Route description ==
State Route 164 begins at exit 253 of Interstate 15 just south of Spanish Fork. The route travels east along 8000 South for about 1.6 miles (2.6 km) before becoming Arrowhead Trail road and turning to the northeast for another 1.1 miles (1.8 km) and ending at SR-198.

== History ==
In 1962, the Utah State Legislature designated State Route 164 (along with State Route 75 and State Route 156 as a state highway in order to "provide adequate connections to Interstate Route 15 between Provo and Springville, and also in the vicinity of Spanish Fork". The route has remained unchanged since then, save for minor rewording in the description to accommodate the renumbering of SR-198 at its eastern terminus.

== Major intersections ==
The entire route is in Utah County.

Location	mi	km	Destinations	Notes
	0.000	0.000	Cattle guard	Southern terminus
	0.016	0.026	I-15 north / US 6 east – Salt Lake City, Price	
	0.112	0.180	I-15 south / US 6 west – Las Vegas, Delta	
Spanish Fork	2.744	4.416	SR-198 (Main Street)	Northern terminus
1.000 mi = 1.609 km; 1.000 km = 0.621 mi
