= Utah State Route 115 =

State highway in Utah, United States

State Route 115
- SR-115 highlighted in red

Route information
- Maintained by UDOT
- Length: 8.247 mi (13.272 km)
- Existed: 1931–present

Major junctions
- South end: SR-198 in Payson
- I-15 / US 6 in Payson; SR-147 in Benjamin
- North end: SR-156 in Spanish Fork

Location
- Country: United States
- State: Utah

Highway system
- Utah State Highway System; Interstate; US; State; Minor; Scenic
← SR-114	→ SR-116

State Route 115 (SR-115) is a state highway in the U.S. state of Utah, connecting Payson and Spanish Fork by way of Benjamin in southwestern Utah County. Running for 8.2 miles (13.20 km) as a two-lane highway, the road runs from SR-198 in Payson north to Benjamin, before heading west toward Spanish Fork and terminating at SR-156. The road was placed under state jurisdiction in the 1930s.

== Route description ==
State Route 115 begins on Main Street at the intersection of 100 North (SR-198) in Payson. Heading north, the route exits the town and intersects Interstate 15/U.S. Route 6 (I-15/US-6) within 0.7 miles (1.13 km). Past I-15/US-6, the road exits the street grid of Payson and enters that of Utah County's, becoming 3200 West. The highway enters the rural community of Benjamin and, upon reaching SR-147, turns west on 7300 South. The road exits the community, passes under I-15/US-6, and turns north on 1550 West. The road turns northwest to parallel I-15/US-6 and then turns west onto 6800 West. Entering Spanish Fork as 100 South, the road terminates at Main Street (SR-156).

== History ==
State Route 115 was established by the legislature in 1931 as running "from Spanish Fork westerly via Benjamin to Payson". The route has not been changed since then.

== Major intersections ==
The entire route is in Utah County.

Location	mi	km	Destinations	Notes
Payson	0.000	0.000	SR-198 (100 North)	Southern terminus
Payson	0.736	1.184	I-15 / US 6 – Las Vegas, Provo	Exit 250 on I-15
Benjamin	3.694	5.945	SR-147 (3200 West, 7300 South) – Lake Shore	
Spanish Fork	8.247	13.272	SR-156 (Main Street)	Northern terminus
1.000 mi = 1.609 km; 1.000 km = 0.621 mi
