= Spring Lake, Utah =

Town in Utah County, Utah, United States

- Town
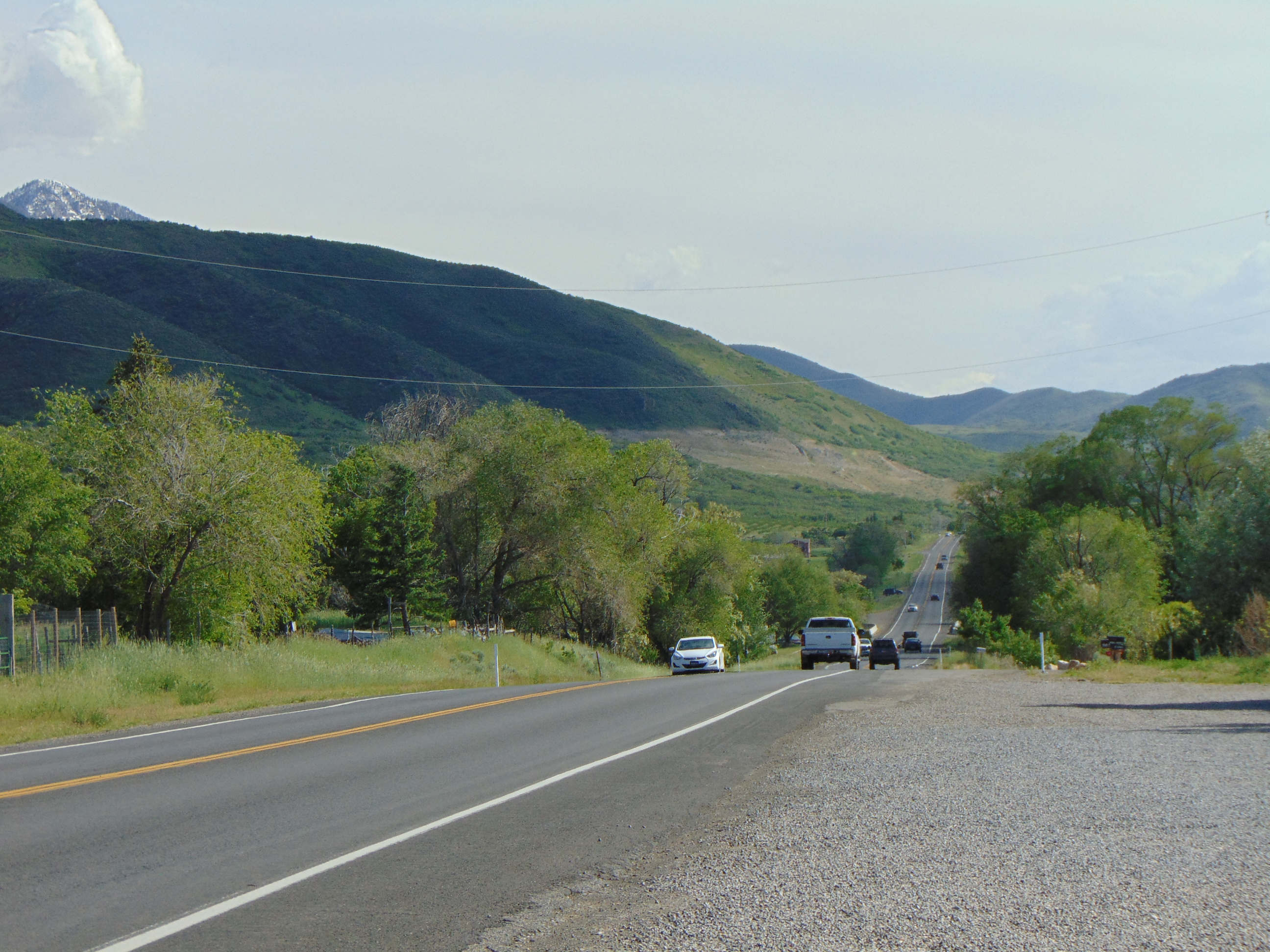
- Looking south along South State Street (SR-198) in northern Spring Lake, May 2016

- Location in Utah County and the state of Utah
- Coordinates: 40°0′1″N 111°44′55″W
- Country: United States
- State: Utah
- County: Utah
- Settled: 1850

Area
  - Total: 1.2 sq mi (3.1 km^{2})
  - Land: 1.2 sq mi (3.1 km^{2})
  - Water: 0 sq mi (0.0 km^{2})
- Elevation: 4,731 ft (1,442 m)

Population (2020)
  - Total: 528
  - Density: 440/sq mi (170/km^{2})
- Time zone: UTC-7 (Mountain (MST))
  - Summer (DST): UTC-6 (MDT)
- ZIP code: 84651
- Area code: 801
- FIPS code: 49-72170
- GNIS feature ID: 1446051

Spring Lake is a town in southern Utah County, Utah, United States. It is part of the Provo–Orem Metropolitan Statistical Area. The population was 528 at the 2020 census. It is located just south of Payson and northeast of Santaquin.

== Description ==
Much of Spring Lake consists of farms and ranches, with many people owning horses, cattle, and raising alfalfa and hay for their animals. Being located between Payson and Santaquin, the rural area may give way to more homes in the coming years, but as there is no city water for many, wells are needed which place a limit of one house per 5.25 acres (21,200 m^{2}) of land. Only when city water is provided will greater housing density be possible.

The main transportation route through the city is Utah State Route 198 (South State Street), which follows the former routing of U.S. Route 6 and the pre-1974 routing of U.S. Route 91. Although Interstate 15 (I-15) forms the western border of Spring Lake, there is no direct access to the freeway within the community. There are no businesses or stoplights in Spring Lake as of 2018.

== History ==
Spring Lake was the birthplace of Antonga Black Hawk, the famous Ute leader. Antonga led many raids on settlements during Utah's Black Hawk War. After his death in 1870 he was buried in Spring Lake. In 1911 his body was discovered by miners, and moved to an LDS Church museum in Salt Lake City, but was later returned to Spring Lake.

As of July 2023, the Spring Lake community had begun the process of becoming an incorporated town. While the Spring Lake CDP is entirely east of I-15, the proposed town's limits would extend west to South 5200 West, resulting in about one-third of the town being west of the freeway, with common borders with Payson on the north and Santaquin on the south. (As of February 2024, the only paved road that would connect the community on both sides of I-15 would be West 12400 South.)

Residents of the community voted in favor of incorporation in the 2024 General Election, with 66% in favor and 34% against. Community residents will decide on initial terms for municipal officers who will then be elected in 2025. Proponents of incorporation indicated intent for all utilities and services to continue through the county or private contracts, with the new municipal council focusing on regulating new residential development in the town

== Geography ==
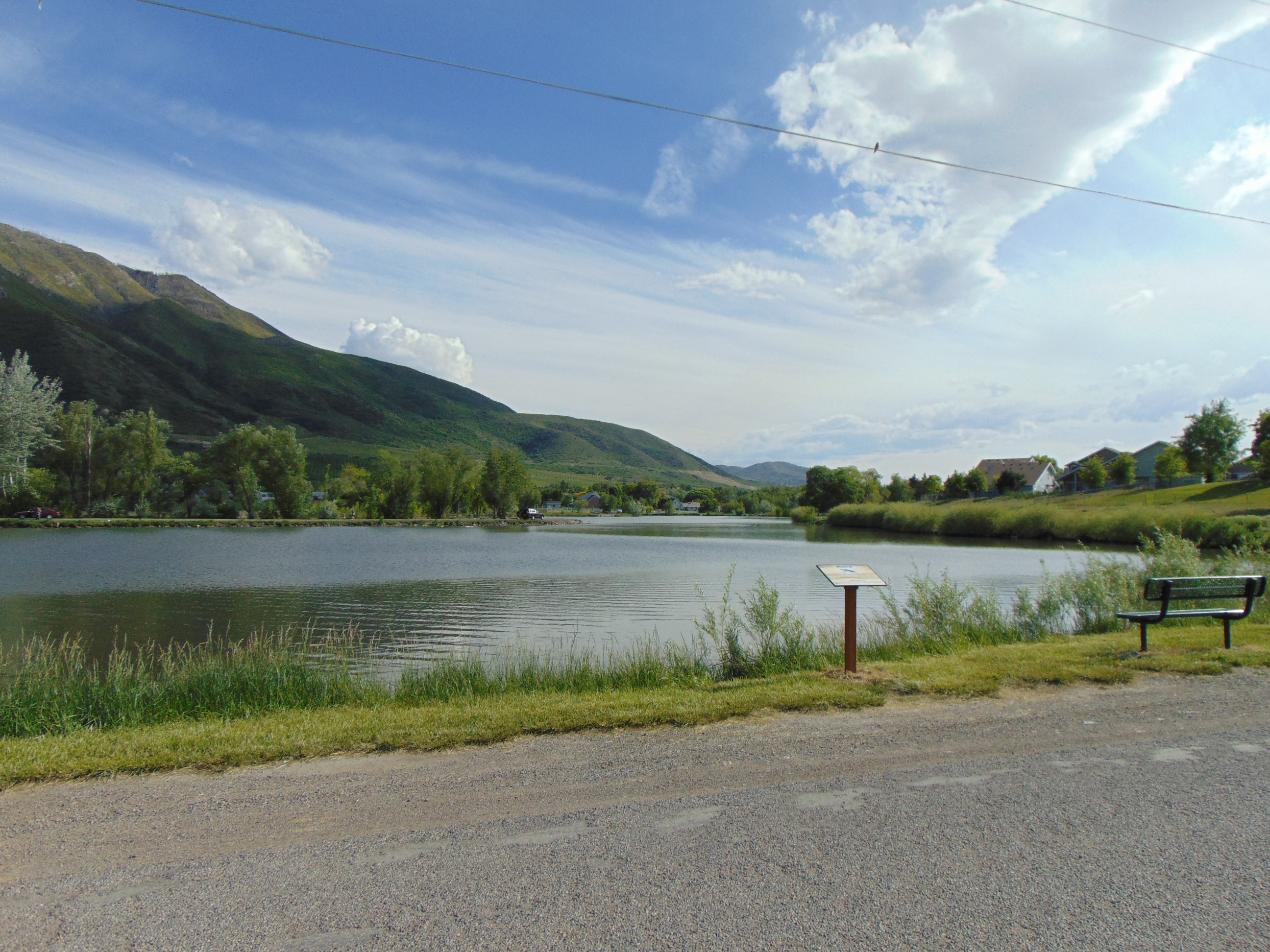
South across Spring Lake in Spring Lake, May 2016

According to the United States Census Bureau, the CDP has a total area of 1.2 square miles (3.1 km^{2}), of which 1.2 square miles (3.1 km^{2}) is land and 0.012 square miles (0.03 km^{2}), or 0.91%, is water.

Spring Lake is at approximately 4,700 feet (1,400 m) above sea level. The small lake of the same name is only a few feet deep under normal conditions, but in the spring of 2006 the lake was drained in order to dredge it and make it deeper. It was then refilled in the fall of 2006 and now contains trout.

== Demographics ==
Historical population
Census	Pop.	Note	%±
1880	157		—
1890	93		−40.8%
1900	232		149.5%
1910	188		−19.0%
1920	252		34.0%
1930	300		19.0%
1940	453		51.0%
1950	495		9.3%
2000	469		—
2010	458		−2.3%
2020	528		15.3%
Source: U.S. Census Bureau

As of the census of 2000, there were 469 people, 129 households, and 110 families residing in the CDP. The population density was 236.8 people per square mile (91.5/km^{2}). There were 134 housing units at an average density of 67.7/sq mi (26.1/km^{2}). The racial makeup of the CDP was 85.50% White, 0.21% Native American, 0.43% Asian, 0.21% Pacific Islander, 11.73% from other races, and 1.92% from two or more races. Hispanic or Latino of any race were 13.86% of the population.

There were 129 households, out of which 45.7% had children under the age of 18 living with them, 78.3% were married couples living together, 5.4% had a female householder with no husband present, and 14.7% were non-families. 13.2% of all households were made up of individuals, and 7.0% had someone living alone who was 65 years of age or older. The average household size was 3.64 and the average family size was 4.01.

In the CDP, the population was spread out, with 33.9% under the age of 18, 11.3% from 18 to 24, 24.7% from 25 to 44, 22.0% from 45 to 64, and 8.1% who were 65 years of age or older. The median age was 29 years. For every 100 females, there were 100.4 males. For every 100 females age 18 and over, there were 103.9 males.

The median income for a household in the CDP was $38,646, and the median income for a family was $38,958. Males had a median income of $28,929 versus $37,692 for females. The per capita income for the CDP was $15,314. About 6.0% of families and 10.8% of the population were below the poverty line, including 20.8% of those under age 18 and none of those age 65 or over.

== See also ==
- List of census-designated places in Utah
