= Utah State Route 147 =

State highway in Utah, United States

State Route 147
- SR-147 highlighted in red

Route information
- Maintained by UDOT
- Length: 18.175 mi (29.250 km)
- Existed: June 26, 1933–present

Major junctions
- South end: SR-141 at McBeth Corner
- North end: US 89 in Mapleton

Location
- Country: United States
- State: Utah

Highway system
- Utah State Highway System; Interstate; US; State; Minor; Scenic
← SR-145	→ SR-148

State route 147 (SR-147) is a state highway in the U.S. state of Utah. Spanning 18.175 miles (29.250 km), it connects West Mountain and Benjamin in western Utah Valley with Interstate 15 (I-15), Spanish Fork, and Mapleton on the east side of the valley.

== Route description ==
State Route 147 begins west of Payson at McBeth Corner, which is the northern terminus of SR-141 and the intersection of 5600 West and 10400 South. From this point, the route travels north approximately 4 miles (6.4 km) (continuing along the same road taken by SR-141 to the south) passing through West Mountain, before turning east at 7300 South. The route continues approximately 3 miles (4.8 km) to Benjamin, then intersecting SR-115 (which turns into Payson's Main Street) and turning north on 3200 West. State Route 147 travels north about 1 mile (1.6 km) before again turning east on 6400 South, just south of Lake Shore. From here, the route continues east, under I-15, through central Spanish Fork as 400 North, across US-89 before finally turning north on Main Street in Mapleton. State Route 147 travels north on Main Street about 1 mile (1.6 km), then turns west on Maple Street, ending as it intersects US-89 again, this time from the east.

== History ==
State Route 147 was established on June 26, 1933 along an alignment similar to the current one, with two key differences. It originally started in Payson, travelling west along Utah Ave/10400 South until turning north at its current starting point at McBeth Corner, and it originally ended on Main Street in Mapleton. In 1935, the state legislature ended SR-147 at US-89 (then known as SR-8) and split off the last stretch of the route between US-89 (then known as SR-8) and Mapleton as State Route 167. In 1939, the state legislature designated State Route 203 as an extension of SR-147 from its Mapleton end, travelling 1 mile (1.6 km) east and 1 mile (1.6 km) north to SR-167. This extension was absorbed into SR-147 two years later, in 1941.

SR-147 remained unchanged until 1969, when the section of SR-167 along Maple Street was redesignated as part of SR-147. The section of SR-167 from SR-147 via Main Street to Mapleton was cancelled. The route again remained unchanged until 2000, when the portion of the route from Payson west to McBeth Corner was transferred to Payson City and Utah County in exchange for UDOT designating 800 South in Payson from I-15 east to SR-198 (State Street) as State Route 178.

== Major intersections ==
The entire route is in Utah County.

Location	mi	km	Destinations	Notes
McBeth Corner	0.000	0.000	SR-141 (5600 West)	Southern terminus
Benjamin	6.947	11.180	SR-115 (3200 West/7300 South)	Route turns north along 3200 West
	8.088	13.016	SR-77 (3200 West)	SR-77 continues straight, route turns east
Spanish Fork	11.327– 11.415	18.229– 18.371	I-15	
Spanish Fork	12.119	19.504	SR-156 (Main Street)	
Spanish Fork	13.135	21.139	US 6	Overpass
Spanish Fork	13.166	21.189	SR-51	
Mapleton	15.151	24.383	US 89 (1600 West)	
Mapleton	18.175	29.250	US 89 (1600 West)	Northern terminus
1.000 mi = 1.609 km; 1.000 km = 0.621 mi
