= Leland, Utah =

Ghost town in Utah, United States

Coordinates: 40°05′56″N 111°41′25″W

Leland is an unincorporated community in southern Utah County, Utah, United States. Its elevation is 4,564 feet (1,391 m). Formerly a separate settlement, it has been largely absorbed into the city of Spanish Fork, with most of the rest being included in the boundaries of Benjamin (a census-designated place).
