= Utah State Route 178 =

State highway in Utah, United States

State Route 178

Route information
- Maintained by UDOT
- Length: 1.198 mi (1.928 km)
- Existed: 2000–present

Major junctions
- West end: I-15 / US 6 in Payson
- East end: SR-198 in Payson

Location
- Country: United States
- State: Utah

Highway system
- Utah State Highway System; Interstate; US; State; Minor; Scenic
← SR-177	→ SR-180

State Route 178 (SR-178) is a state highway in the U.S. state of Utah. Spanning just 1.2 miles (1.9 km) in Payson, it connects Interstate 15 to SR-198.

== Route description ==
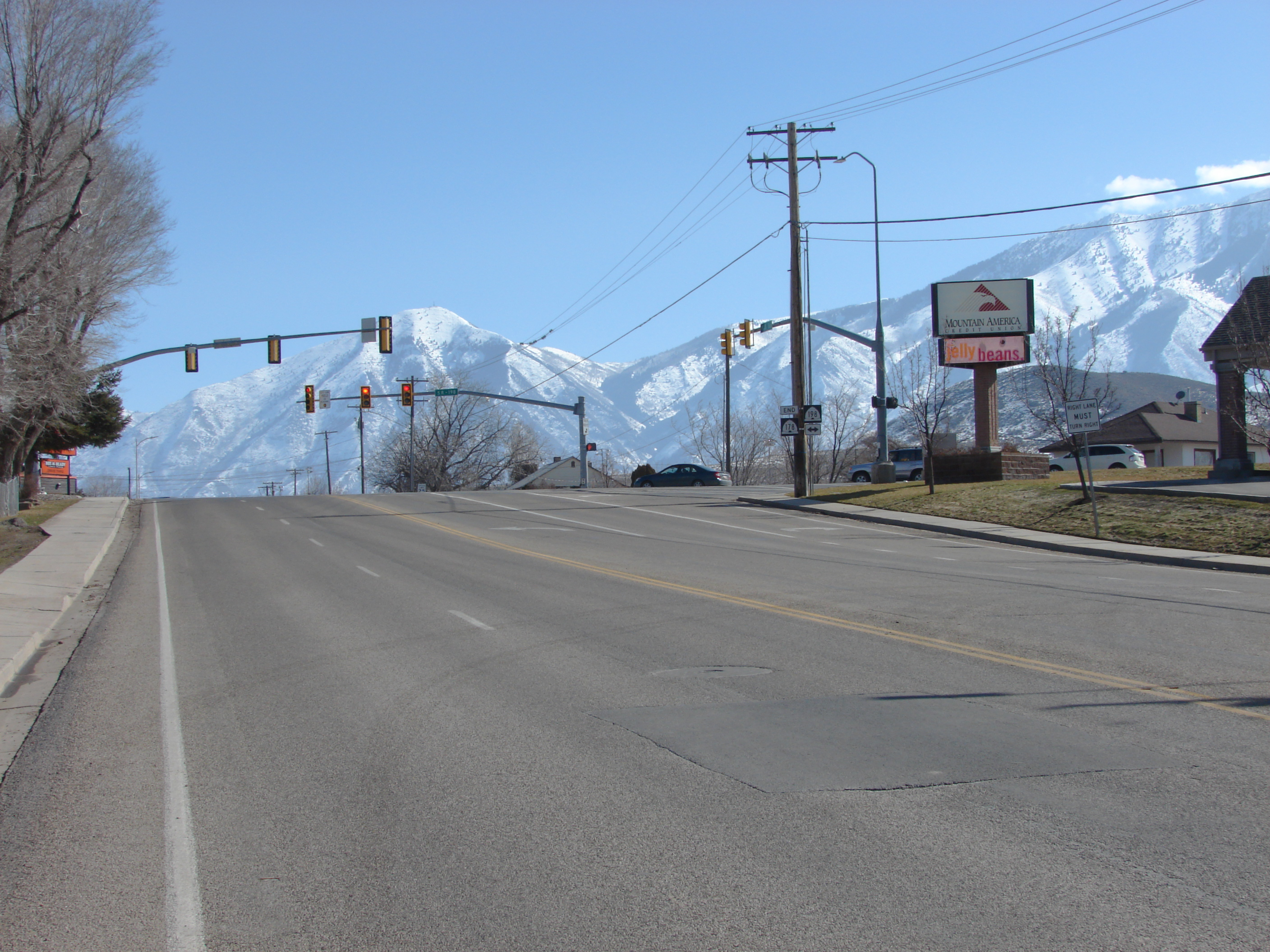
Eastern terminus

State Route 178, a minor arterial connector, starts at Interstate 15's southbound ramp for exit 248, a diamond interchange. The route proceeds east on 800 South, over the interchange, continuing through Payson until terminatining 1.2 miles (1.9 km) at SR-198.

== History ==
State Route 178 was added to the state highway system in 2000 in exchange for transferring ownership of the western portion of SR-147 from the Utah Department of Transportation to the city of Payson, as SR-178 connected to Interstate 15 and would be a more appropriate road for the state highway system. No changes have been made to the highway since.

== Major intersections ==
The entire route is in Payson, Utah County.

mi	km	Destinations	Notes
0.000	0.000	I-15 south / US 6 west – Las Vegas	Western terminus
0.168	0.270	I-15 north / US 6 east – Salt Lake City	
1.198	1.928	SR-198 (State Street)	Eastern terminus
1.000 mi = 1.609 km; 1.000 km = 0.621 mi
