= Roswell Darius Bird Sr. House =

Historic house in Utah, United States

- U.S. National Register of Historic Places
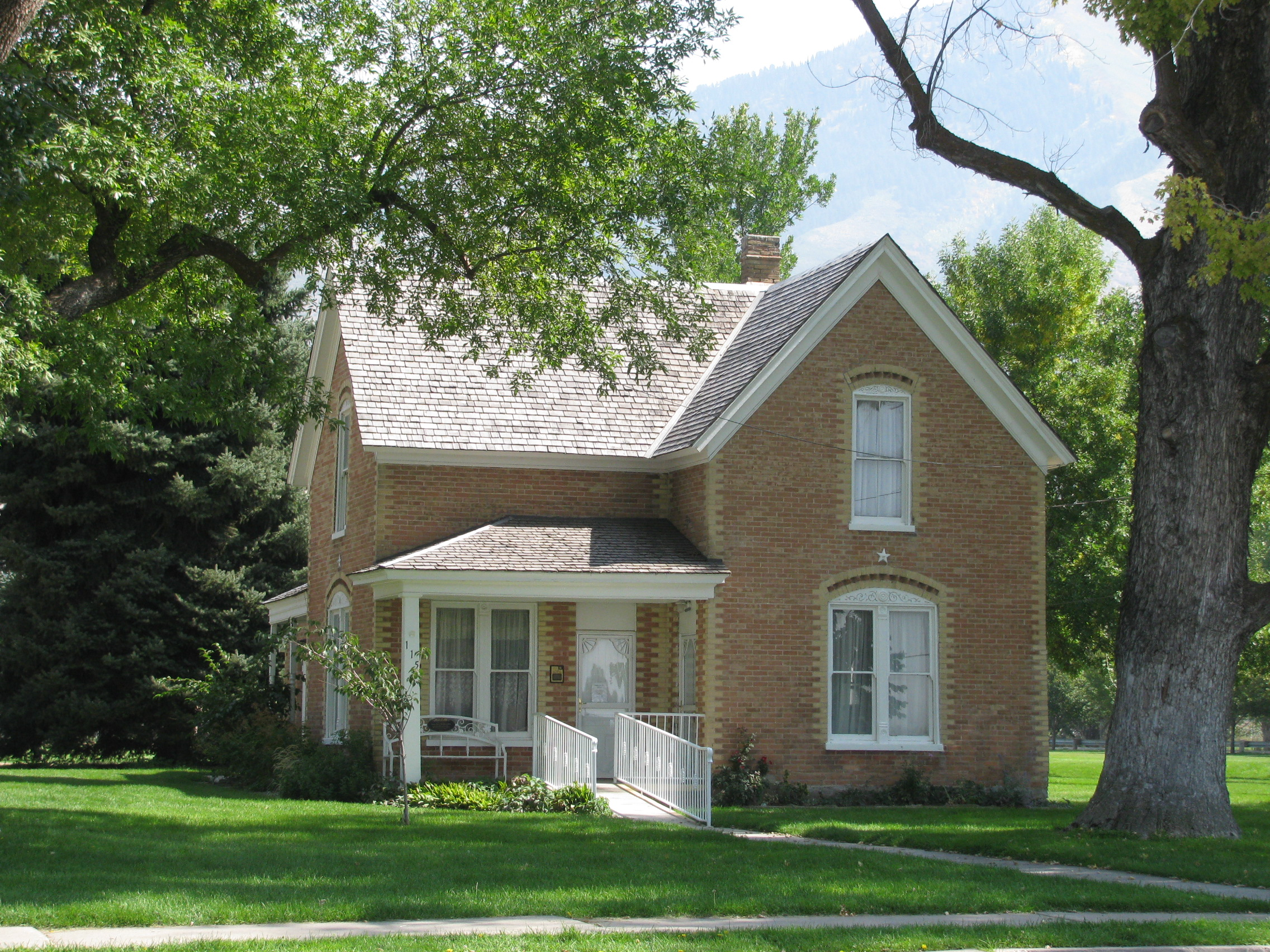
- The Bird House in September 2012

- Location within Utah Location within the United States
- Location: 115 South Main Street; Mapleton, Utah; United States
- Coordinates: 40°7′46″N 111°34′40″W
- Area: less than one acre
- Built: 1892
- Built by: Roswell Darius Bird, Sr.
- Architectural style: Victorian Eclectic
- NRHP reference No.: 80003977
- Added to NRHP: November 28, 1980

The Roswell Darius Bird Sr. House on South Main Street (Utah State Route 147) in Mapleton, Utah, United States was built in 1892. It was listed on the National Register of Historic Places in 1980.

The house has seven rooms.

In the 1980s the home was purchased by Mapleton City. In the 1990s early Mapleton Pioneer artifacts were collected by members of the Mapleton Historical Society. The artifacts were put on display in the home and the Mapleton Heritage Museum was created. The home is currently being used as the Mapleton Heritage Museum and home of the Mapleton Historical Society.

== See also ==
- National Register of Historic Places listings in Utah County, Utah
