= Utah State Route 51 =

State highway in Utah, United States

State Route 51
- SR-51 highlighted in red

Route information
- Maintained by UDOT
- Length: 3.339 mi (5.374 km)
- Existed: 1992–present

Major junctions
- South end: SR-147 in Spanish Fork
- North end: US 89 in Springville

Location
- Country: United States
- State: Utah

Highway system
- Utah State Highway System; Interstate; US; State; Minor; Scenic
← US 50	→ SR-52

State Route 51 (SR-51) is a short 3.339-mile-long (5.374 km) state highway completely within Utah County in northern Utah. SR-51 connects SR-147 to U.S. Route 89 (US-89). The highway is an old routing of US-91.

== Route description ==
The route begins at the intersection of 400 North (SR-147) and Childs Road in Spanish Fork, SR-51 heading northeast as a two-lane undivided highway on the latter. As the road exits Spanish Fork, it heads into a rural portion of Utah County. The continues northeast until 1600 North south of Springville, where the road turns north. The road continues north until terminating at a grade-separated intersection with US-89, one of the oldest grade-separated intersections in Utah.

== History ==
The road from Spanish Fork to Springville (leaving the latter on 800 North) was added to the state highway system in 1910, and in the 1920s it became part of SR-1 (US-91). In 1964, when SR-1 was moved to the newly completed I-15 in the area, the old route between Spanish Fork and Springville became an extension of SR-156 (which had been created in 1962 as a short connection between old and new SR-1 at exit 257). In 1992, because of safety problems at "Maggie's Bend", where SR-156 turned from 800 North onto Childs Road in eastern Spanish Fork, caused in part by superelevation of the curve, 800 North was given to the city and the state took over Childs Road. This split SR-156 in two (with the original section, serving as a spur since 1964, becoming part of the mainline), and the portion on Childs Road and to Springville became a new State Route 51.

The junction with US-89 at the north end of SR-51 is a grade separated interchange constructed in 1959 (as the split of US-89 and US-91), making this one of the oldest grade separated interchanges in Utah still in use. Although portions of Interstate 15 were constructed in 1955, the Beck Street interchange (I-15/US-89) is the only original structure from 1955 still in use.

== Major intersections ==
The entire route is in Utah County.

Location	mi	km	Destinations	Notes
Spanish Fork	0.000	0.000	SR-147 (400 North)	Southern terminus
Springville	3.339	5.374	US 89 (Main Street)	Northern terminus; Grade-separated intersection
1.000 mi = 1.609 km; 1.000 km = 0.621 mi
