= Utah State Route 156 =

State highway in Spanish Fork, Utah, U.S.

State Route 156
- SR-156 highlighted in red

Route information
- Maintained by UDOT
- Length: 1.382 mi (2.224 km)
- Existed: 1962–present

Major junctions
- South end: SR-198 in Spanish Fork
- North end: I-15 / US 6 in Spanish Fork

Location
- Country: United States
- State: Utah

Highway system
- Utah State Highway System; Interstate; US; State; Minor; Scenic
← SR-155	→ SR-157

Utah State Route 156 (SR-156) is a state highway in the U.S. state of Utah. Spanning just 1.38 miles (2.22 km), it connects the city of Spanish Fork, via Main Street, with Interstate 15 on the north side of town.

== Route description ==
State Route 156 starts on the south side of Spanish Fork at the intersection of Main Street and SR-198 (300 South, also the former alignment of US-6). From there, the route travels north along Main Street through the center of town for 1.3 miles (2.1 km) until ending at an interchange with I-15 / US-6.

The entire route is listed as part of the National Highway System.

== History ==
Utah State Route 1, ran through Spanish Fork, being designated as early as 1910, and was later known as U.S. Route 91. Its original alignment entered Spanish Fork from the south along Main Street, travelling north through the city until turning east on 800 North, then leaving the city northeasterly along Childs Road. In 1962, as Interstate 15 was being constructed east and north of the city, the Utah state legislature wanted to have an adequate connection from the interstate to the city, and so they designated State Route 156 as running from SR-1/US-91 north along Main Street to the north Spanish Fork interchange, a distance of 0.4 miles (0.64 km).

When this area of I-15 was completed in 1964, the state legislature realigned SR-1 to coincide with the interstate, so to "maintain continuity" in the state highway system, they redesignated portions of the old SR-1 as extensions of SR-26 (from Santaquin to Spanish Fork), SR-56 (from Spanish Fork to south Springville) and SR-8 (now known as US-89 from south Springville via Provo, Orem, Lindon, Pleasant Grove, and American Fork to the north Lehi interchange). In doing so, the southern terminus of SR-56 was moved south 1 mile (1.6 km) to its current location, which at the time was an intersection with US-6. What was the original portion of the route was now a spur to connect the interstate, while the main alignment now turned east on 800 North to follow the former SR-1 along US-91. In 1992, because of safety problems at "Maggie's Bend", where SR-156 turned from 800 North onto Childs Road in eastern Spanish Fork, caused in part by superelevation of the curve, 800 North was given to the city and the state took over Childs Road, with the original northern end of the route that had served as a spur returned to the mainline, and the portion along Childs Road to Springville became a new state route, SR-51. The route has remained unchanged since.

== Major intersections ==
The entire route is in Spanish Fork, Utah County.

mi	km	Destinations	Notes
0.000	0.000	SR-198 (300 South)	Southern terminus
0.172	0.277	SR-115 (100 South)	
0.624	1.004	SR-147 (400 North)	
0.978	1.574	800 North	Former mainline of SR-156 (See History)
1.261	2.029	I-15 north / US 6 east – Salt Lake City, Price	
1.382	2.224	I-15 south / US 6 west – Las Vegas, Delta	Northern terminus
1.000 mi = 1.609 km; 1.000 km = 0.621 mi
