= Utah State Route 19 =

State highway in Emery and Grand Counties in Utah, United States

State Route 19
- Interstate 70 Business
- SR-19 highlighted in red

Route information
- Maintained by UDOT
- Length: 4.552 mi (7.326 km)
- Existed: 1969–present

Major junctions
- West end: I-70 / US 6 / US 50 / US 191 near Green River
- East end: I-70 / US 6 / US 50 / US 191 near Green River

Location
- Country: United States
- State: Utah

Highway system
- Interstate Highway System; Main; Auxiliary; Suffixed; Business; Future; Utah State Highway System; Interstate; US; State; Minor; Scenic
← SR-18	→ SR-20

State Route 19 (SR-19) is a state highway in southeastern Utah, running 4.552 miles (7.326 km) in Emery and Grand Counties through Green River. It carries Business Loop I-70 along Main Street in Green River.

== Route description ==
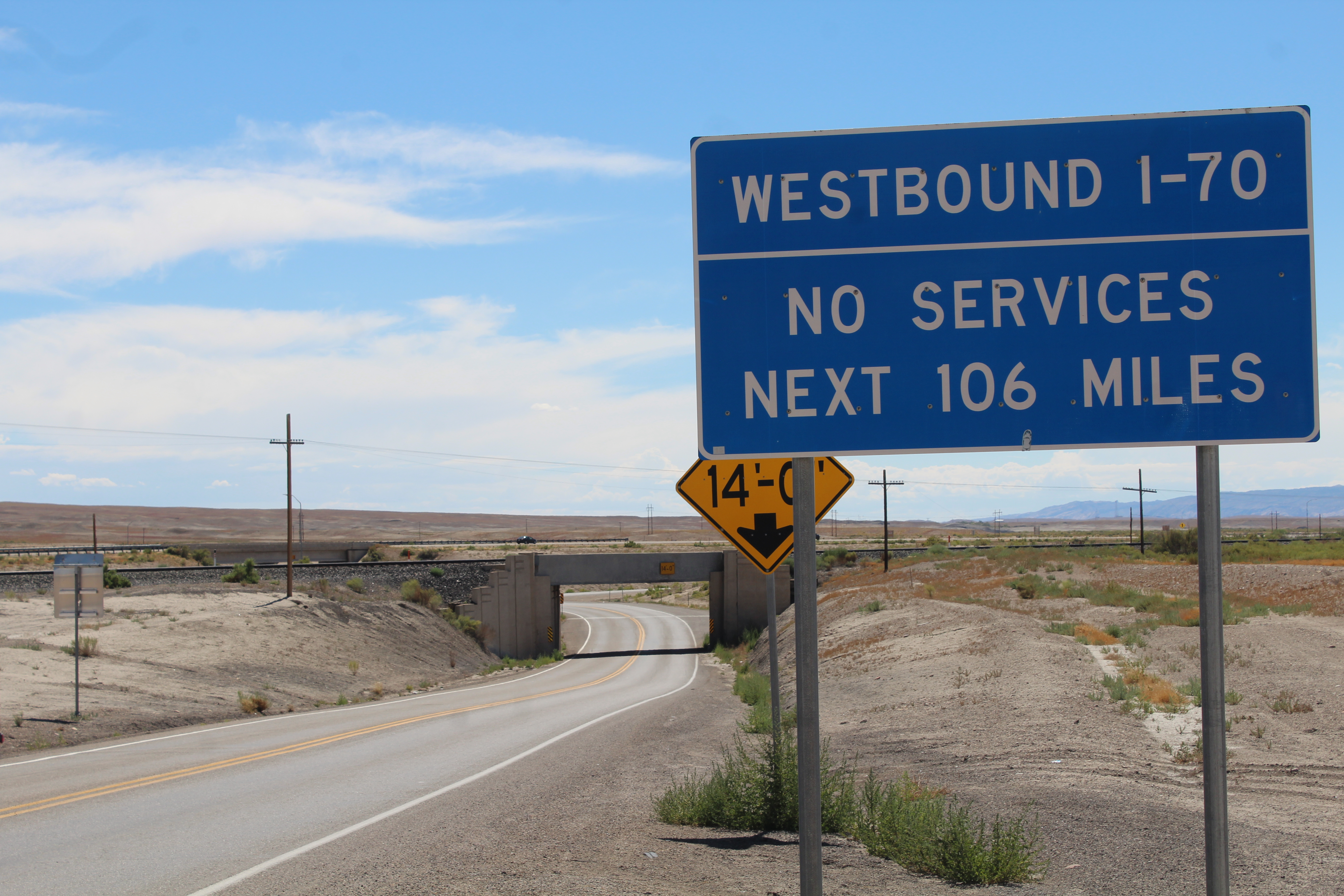
A sign at the western end of SR-19 stating that there are no services on I-70 for the next 106 miles

SR-19 begins at an interchange with I-70 west of Green River and then heads east through the center of town and turns south through the Utah Launch Complex of White Sands Missile Range. It ends at a frontage road just south of another intersection with I-70.

== History ==
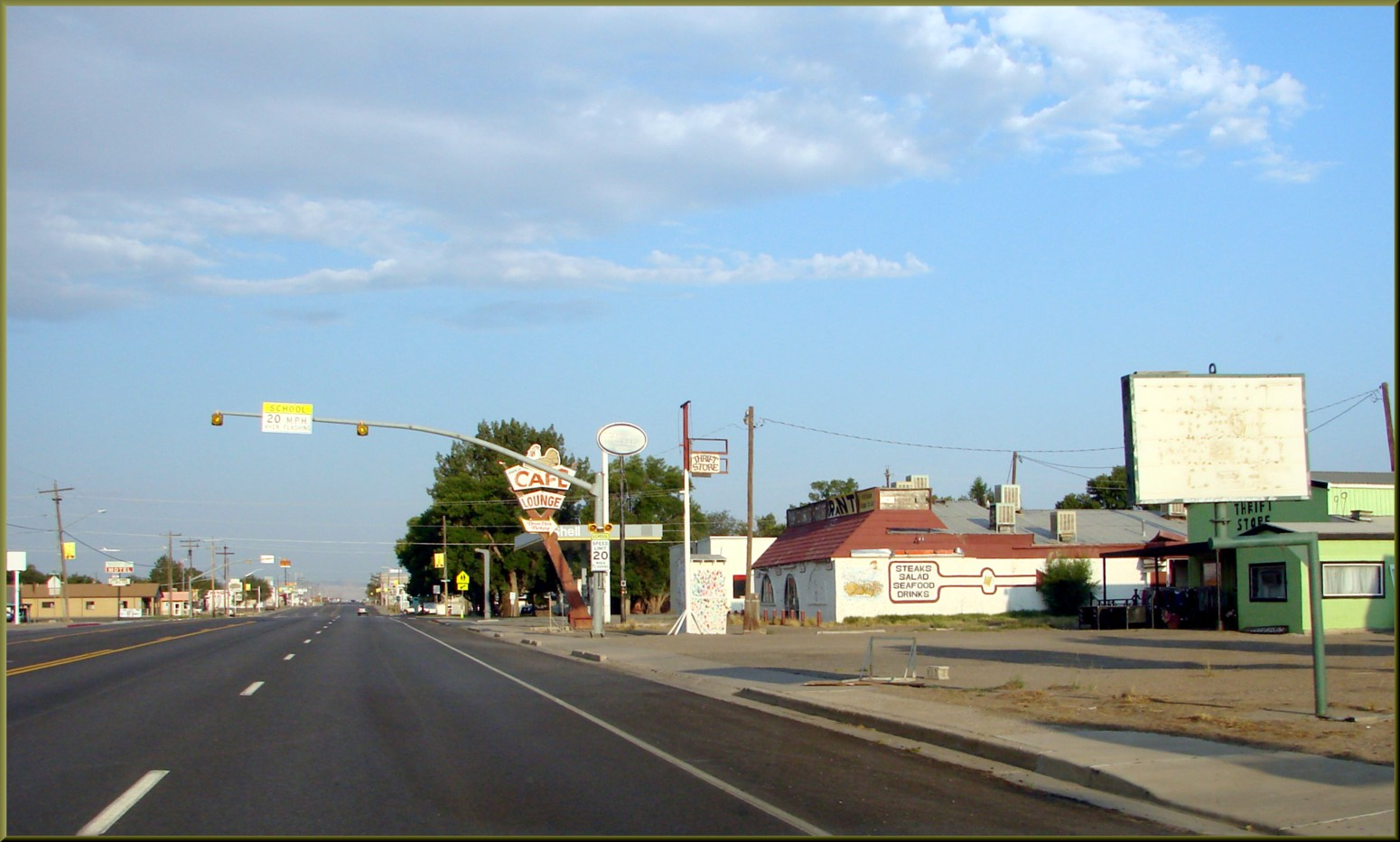
Westbound on SR-19, August 2012

The main road through Green River was added to the state highway system in 1912 and numbered as part of US-50 in the 1920s. The state legislature defined the portion through Green River as State Route 19 in 1969, although the bypass on I-70 had not yet been built. Construction had begun in the mid-1980s, and when finished, the old route, along with a new connection to exit 164, became SR-19.

== Major intersections ==
The entire route is in Green River.

County	mi	km	Destinations	Notes
Emery	0.000– 0.133	0.000– 0.214	I-70 / US 6 / US 50 / US 191 – Grand Junction, Price, Salina	Western terminus; I-70 exit 160
Grand	4.449– 4.528	7.160– 7.287	I-70 / US 6 / US 50 / US 191 – Crescent Junction, Price, Salina	Eastern terminus; I-70 exit 164
1.000 mi = 1.609 km; 1.000 km = 0.621 mi

== See also ==
- List of state highways in Utah
