= Woodside, Utah =

- Ghost town
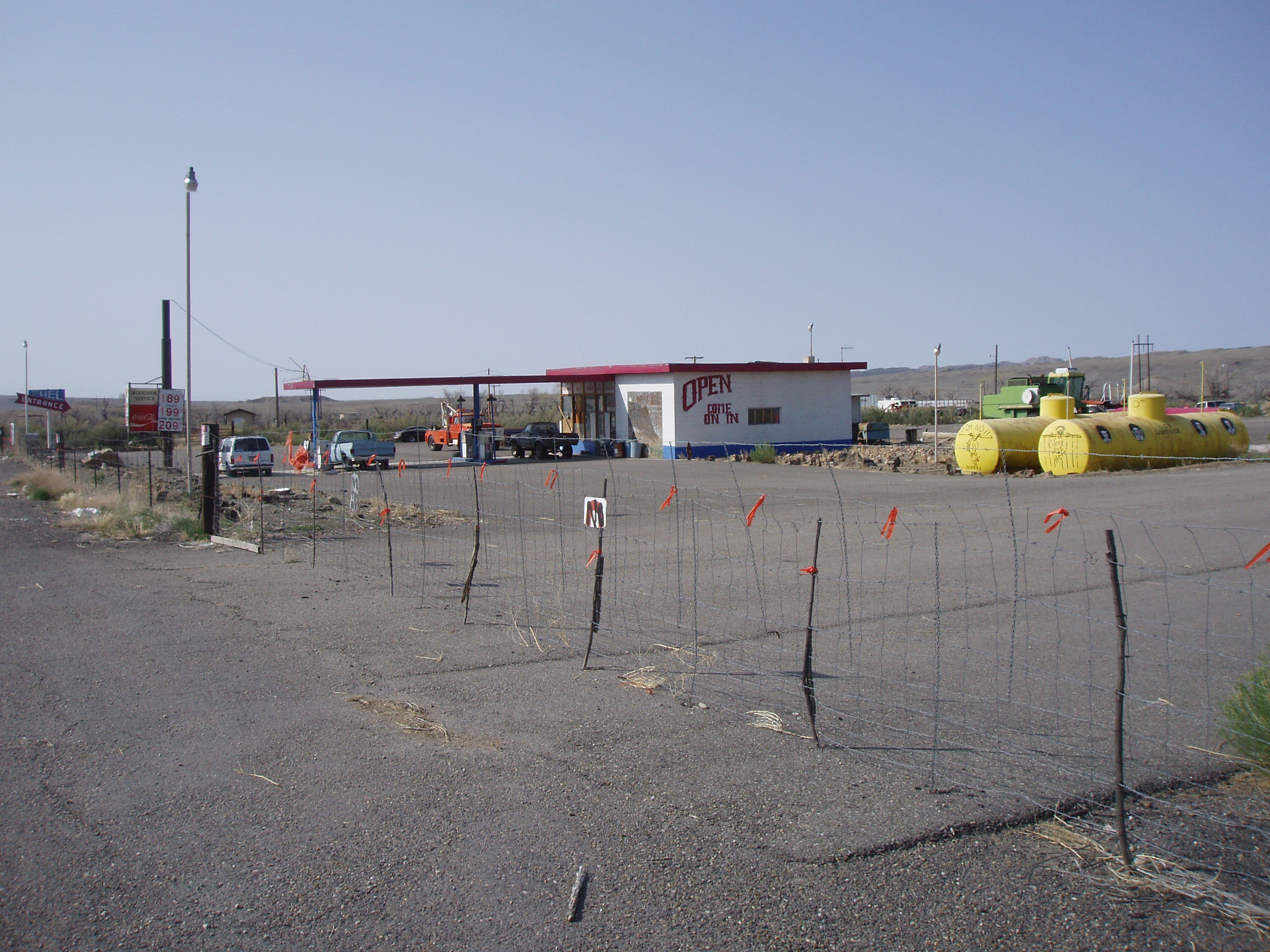
- The roadside filling station at Woodside

- Location within Utah Location within the United States
- Coordinates: 39°15′56″N 110°20′56″W
- Country: United States
- State: Utah
- County: Emery
- Established: 1881
- Abandoned: c. 1970
- Elevation: 4,642 ft (1,415 m)
- GNIS feature ID: 1437726

Woodside is a ghost town located on the west bank of the shallow Price River in the nearly uninhabited eastern part of Emery County, Utah, United States. Its fenced-in filling station is one of the only signs of human activity along the lonely stretch of U.S. Route 6/191 between Wellington and Green River.

== History ==
Construction on the site began with a Denver and Rio Grande Western Railroad bridge and water stop. The area's first resident was a local prospector named Henry H. Hutchinson, who settled here in 1881. Other homesteaders arrived the next year and started digging an irrigation canal. Attracted by relatively abundant water and an extensive growth of cottonwood trees, they founded a settlement known as Lower Crossing. As the town grew, adding a few stores and a blacksmith shop, it was renamed "Woodside" for the cottonwood groves.

One of Woodside's biggest challenges was the Price River itself. Before the construction of Scofield Reservoir the streamflow was highly variable, peaking early and nearly drying up by late summer. The river's large drainage basin also meant that even a distant cloudburst could bring a destructive flash flood. Despite these problems the town continued growing. A hotel and stockyards were built adjacent to the railroad station, and Woodside became a supply point for neighboring ranches. A schoolhouse built in 1892 served as a town gathering place. In 1897, following a train robbery at Castle Gate, Butch Cassidy hid in a network of tunnels under one house outside town.

In 1900 the population stood at 114; it had almost tripled by 1910, when it had schools, saloons, and a large hotel, and the population had reached 328. The population dropped to 300 in 1920.

In the late 1920s Woodside's livestock shipping facilities and railroad station were taken away when the railroad consolidated much of its operations in Helper. This blow was followed by severe droughts in the 1930s, and by 1940 the population had dropped to 30.

In the 1940s Woodside became a minor tourist attraction. In the 1880s the railroad had dug a large water well here, which had later turned into a cold bubbling mudpot driven by naturally occurring pressurized carbon dioxide gas. The hole was developed into a cold water geyser, along with a filling station, store, and cafe.

In 1924, Utah Oil & Refining drilled the Woodside #1 well, located about three and a half miles southwest of the town. The well did not encounter oil, but rather a large flow of helium-rich gas. President Calvin Coolidge set aside the "Woodside Dome Field" as "United States Helium Reserve #1". The Field never produced any helium because most of the other gas was inert (nitrogen), but the potential reserves are said to be substantial. Today, it remains an untapped helium resource.

In the 1960s, the Highway Beautification Act led to the removal of a number of billboards advertising the town's geyser along U.S. Route 6, which had a major impact on tourist visits. The cafe and store burned down around 1970, and the geyser and filling station are the only remnants of Woodside. The geyser formerly spouted as high as 75 feet (23 m), but is much lower now.

A tanker truck explosion scene in the 1991 film Thelma & Louise was shot in Woodside; the town was bought by Roy Pogue in the early 1990s. In 2012 Pogue decided to sell the townsite.

== Climate ==
According to the Köppen Climate Classification system, Woodside has a semi-arid climate, abbreviated "BSk" on climate maps.

== See also ==
- List of ghost towns in Utah
