= U.S. Route 6 in Utah =

Section of U.S. Highway in Utah

U.S. Route 6
- Grand Army of the Republic Highway
- US 6 highlighted in red

Route information
- Maintained by UDOT
- Length: 373.963 mi (601.835 km)
- Existed: 1936–present

Major junctions
- West end: US 6 / US 50 towards Ely, NV
- US 50 in Delta; I-15 from Santaquin to Spanish Fork; US 89 in Moark Junction; US 191 near Price; I-70 near Green River
- East end: I-70 / US 6 / US 50 towards Grand Junction, CO

Location
- Country: United States
- State: Utah
- Counties: Millard, Juab, Utah, Wasatch, Carbon, Emery, Grand

Highway system
- United States Numbered Highway System; List; Special; Divided; Utah State Highway System; Interstate; US; State; Minor; Scenic
| ← US 491 | → SR-7 |

U.S. Route 6 (US-6) is an east–west United States Numbered Highway through the central part of the U.S. state of Utah. Although it is only about 40 miles (64 km) longer than US-50, it serves more populated areas and, in fact, follows what had been US-50's routing until it was moved to follow Interstate 70 (I-70) in 1976. In 2009, the Utah State Legislature named part of the route the "Mike Dmitrich Highway", named after the Utah state senator, which generated controversy, as the state of Utah had previously joined with all the other states through which US-6 passes in naming all of US-6 the Grand Army of the Republic Highway.

== Route description ==
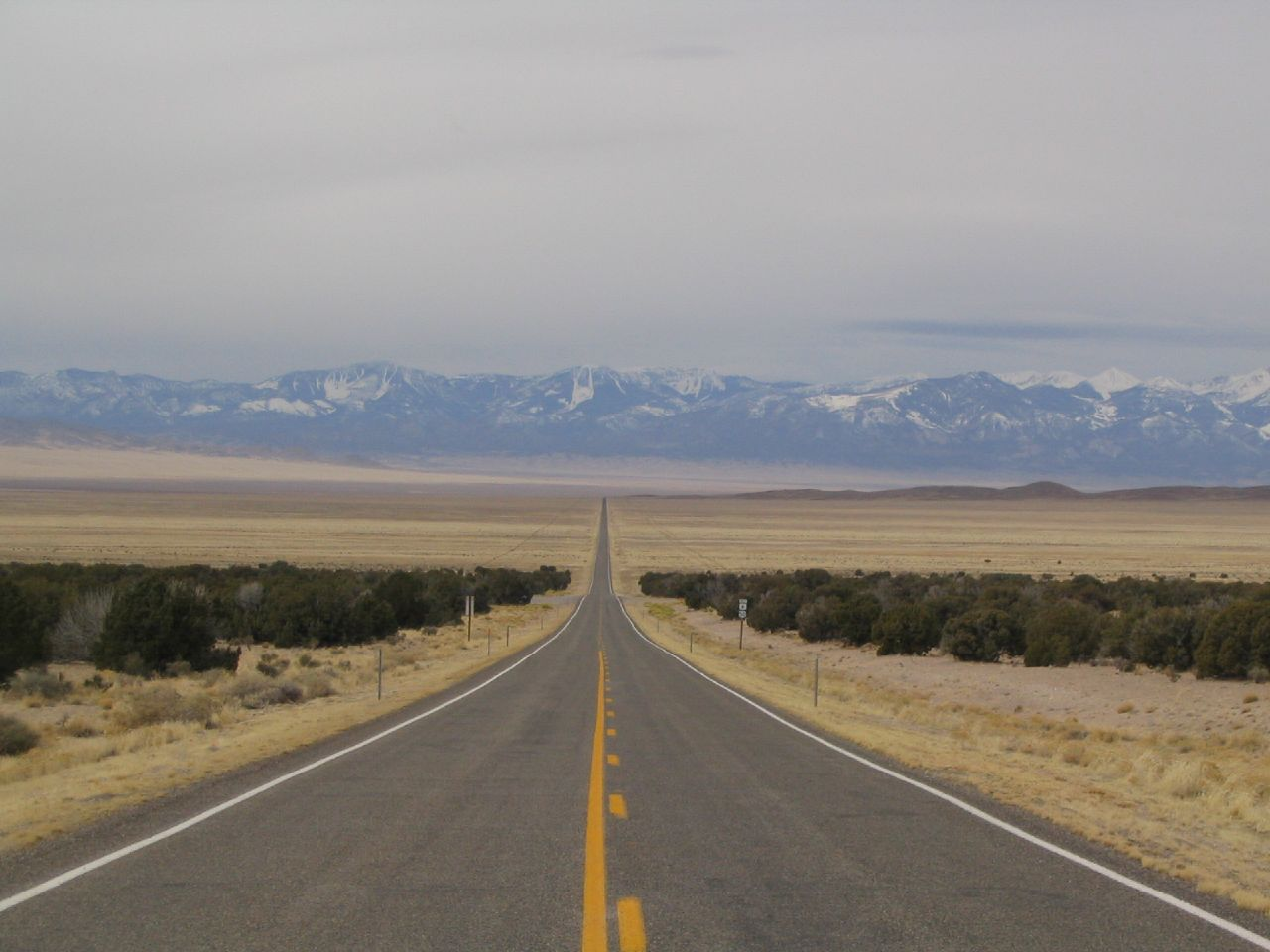
US-6 and US-50 between Nevada border and Delta

US-6 forms an arch-shaped route with Spanish Fork at the apex. The western half of the arch is less traveled and almost entirely two-lane, passing through the Great Basin Desert, Sevier Lake, Delta, Eureka, and the Tintic Standard Reduction Mill. The eastern half of the arch is a busy transportation corridor, with significant parts having four or more lanes. This half passes over Soldier Summit and the historic railroad hub of Helper. According to the National Highway Traffic Safety Administration, there were 519 fatal and serious injury crashes between Spanish Fork and Green River (the non-freeway portion of the eastern half of US-6) from 1996 to 2008, leading the stretch to be considered one of the deadliest roads in the U.S.

Most of the route in Utah is part of the National Highway System, including the 120-mile (190 km) section referenced above as well as the concurrencies with I-15, I-70, and US-50. However, the segment between Delta and Santaquin is not included in the system.

=== Western Utah ===
US-6 enters Utah overlapped with US-50 in the Great Basin, a large desert that includes much of western Utah. As part of the Basin and Range Province, the terrain alternates between north–south oriented flat valleys and mountain ranges. US-6 and US-50 cross Snake Valley, the Confusion Range (through Kings Canyon), and Tule Valley and crest the House Range via Skull Rock Pass. After crossing this mountainous terrain, the road arrives at Pahvant Valley there meeting and passing along the north shore of Sevier Lake, though the road is far enough away that water is usually only visible in the spring months. After Sevier Lake, the desert becomes farm lands, finally reaching the town of Hinckley just before they split in Delta. US-6 turns to the northeast at that city, paralleling the Union Pacific Railroad (UP)'s Lynndyl Subdivision to the west of the Canyon, Gilson, and East Tintic mountains—three ranges that form the eastern boundary of the Basin and Range Province.

At Tintic Junction, the intersection with State Route 36 (SR-36) in the Tintic Valley, US-6 turns east and ascends the East Tintic Mountains. It passes through the mining city of Eureka near the top of the mountains, before descending into the Goshen Valley. Although it left behind the UP rail line at Tintic Junction, this part of US-6 parallels the former Tintic Branch of the Denver and Rio Grande Western Railroad, which has been partially abandoned. After passing through Goshen, the highway curves around the north side of Warm Springs Mountain and into Utah Valley, where it enters Santaquin. On the east side of that city, US-6 begins an overlap with I-15, while the old alignment—SR-198—continues straight through Payson and Salem. After about 13 miles (21 km) together in the Utah Valley, I-15 and US-6 separate in Spanish Fork, the latter turning southeast onto a short two-lane expressway.

=== Eastern Utah ===
SR-198 rejoins US-6 on the eastern outskirts of Spanish Fork, and soon thereafter US-89 joins at Moark Junction. The two routes—US-6 and US-89—begin an overlap here, alongside the UP Provo Subdivision (ex-Denver and Rio Grande Western Railroad), following the Spanish Fork. The remainder of US-6 to the Colorado state line parallels this rail line (which becomes the Green River Subdivision at Helper). The three routes follow the Spanish Fork to Thistle where US-6 and US-89 separate.

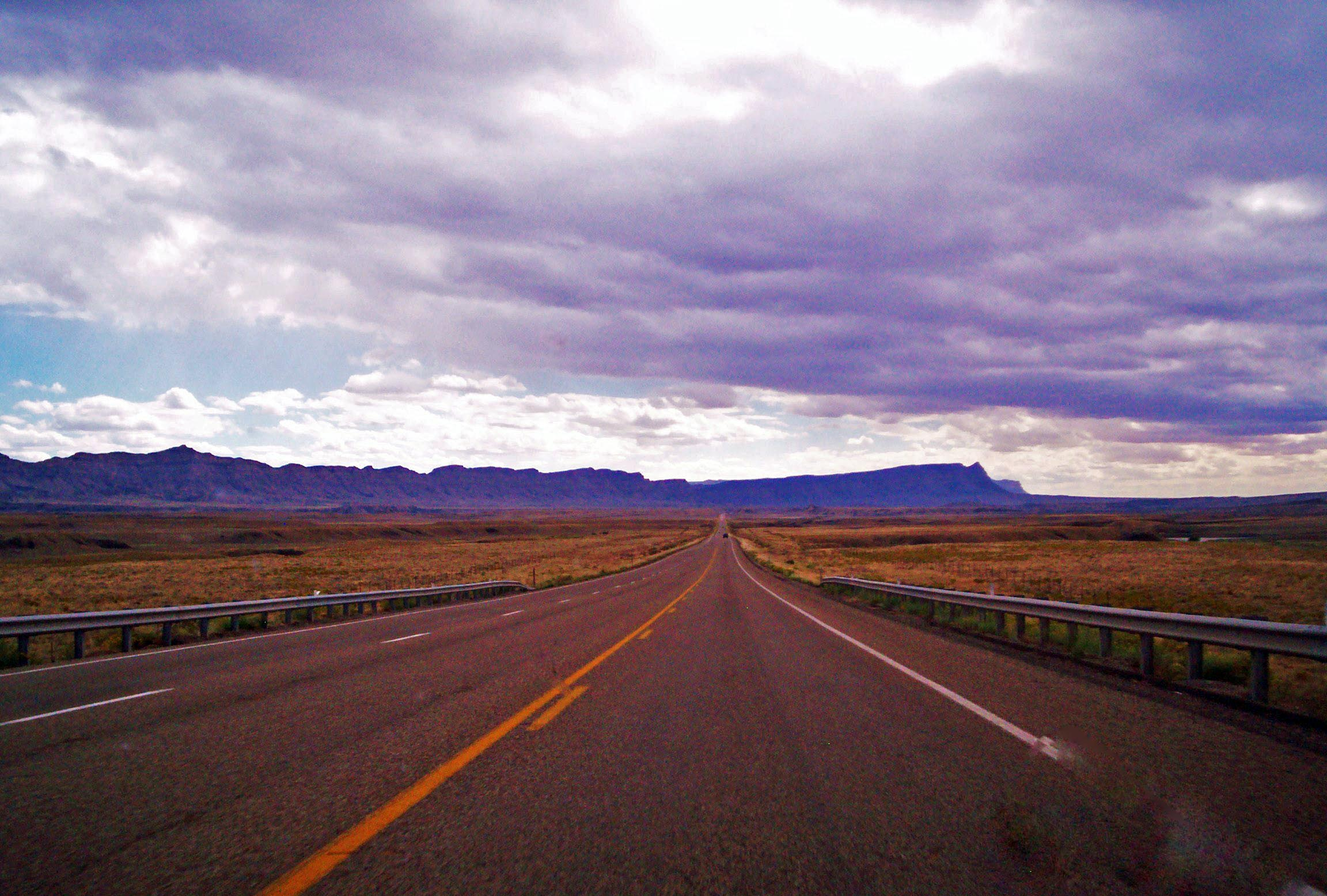
US-6 in Emery County

US-6 begins climbing the Wasatch Plateau, cresting at Soldier Summit, where it finally leaves the Great Basin into the watershed of the Colorado River. It begins to descend by following tributaries of the Price River, first meeting the main stem near Colton. The Price River takes US-6 down through the Price Canyon, the west edge of the Book Cliffs, joining US-191 at Castle Gate. The land flattens and opens out at Helper, named for the helper locomotives needed to carry trains up to Soldier Summit, and US-6 continues southeasterly around Price on a two-lane freeway bypass, with the old alignment marked as both a business route and SR-55. Relatively flat land continues as US-6 parallels the Book Cliffs to the southwest and west, crossing the Price River at Woodside. West of Green River, US-6 joins I-70/US-50, which it overlaps for the remainder of its stay in Utah. Now south of the Book Cliffs, the four routes head east to Crescent Junction, where US-191 splits to the south. As it begins to approach toward the Colorado River, the highway curves northeasterly through the Grand Valley and into Colorado.

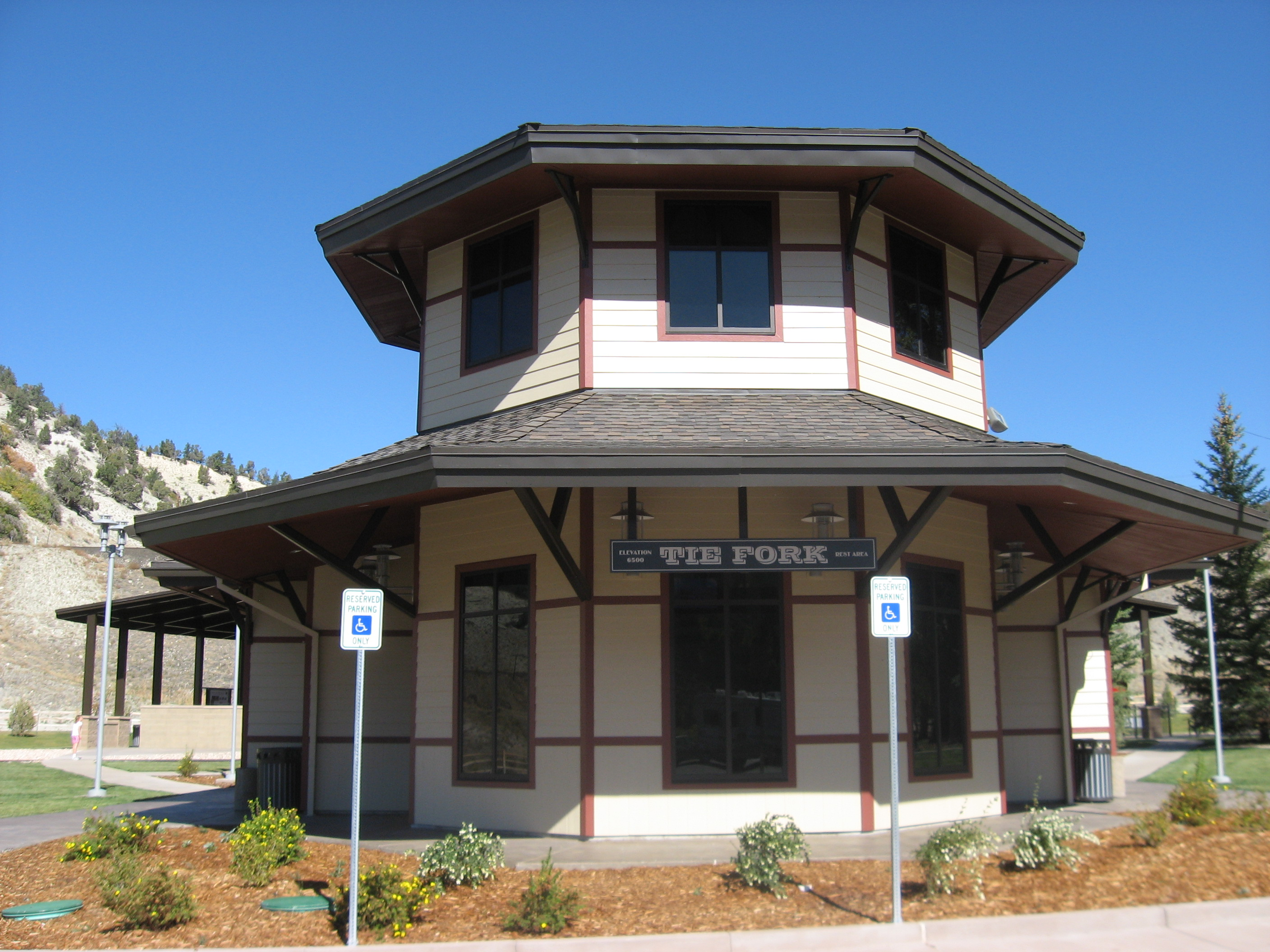
Tie Fork Rest Area along US-6

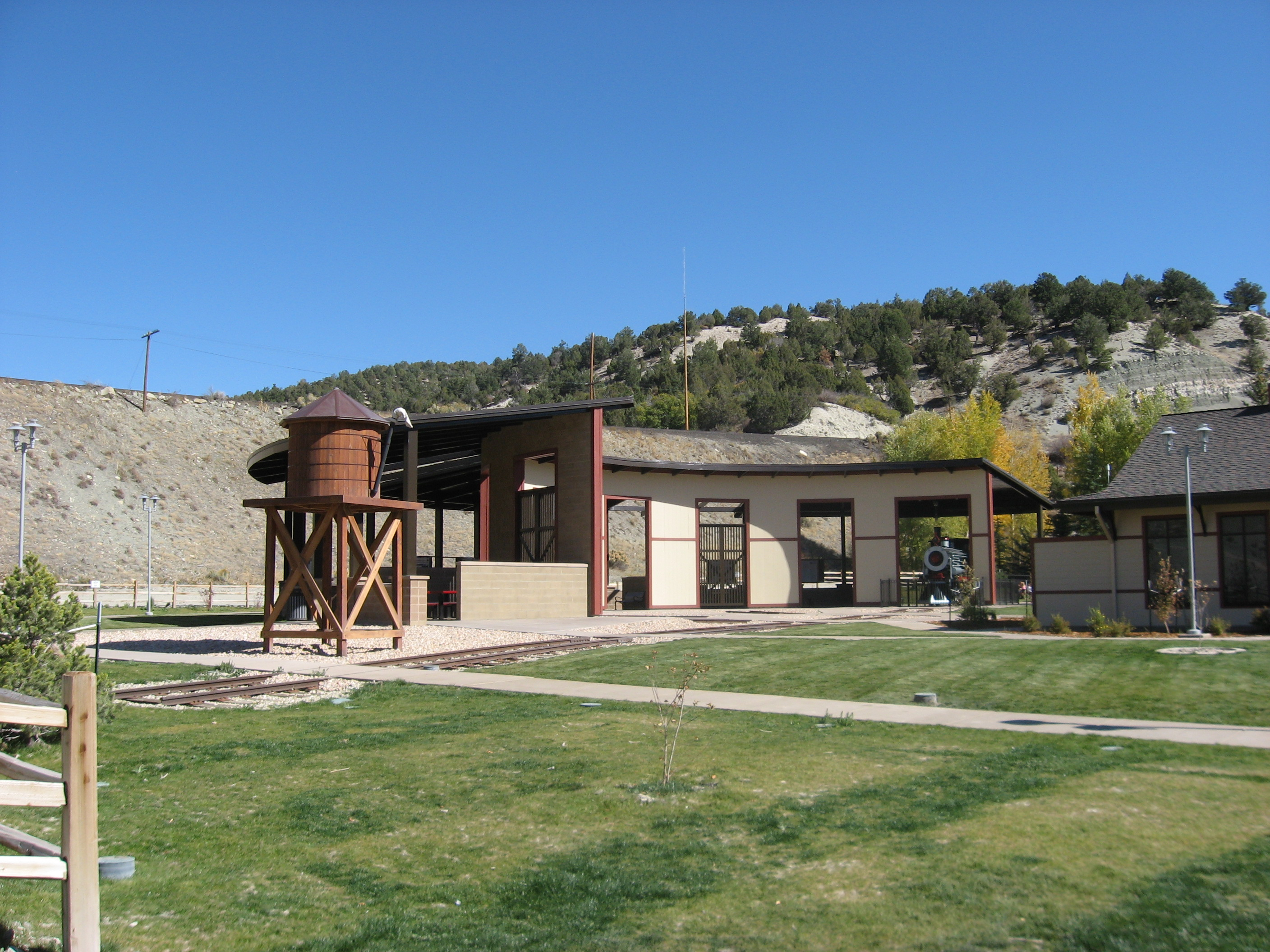
Tie Fork Rest Area along US-6

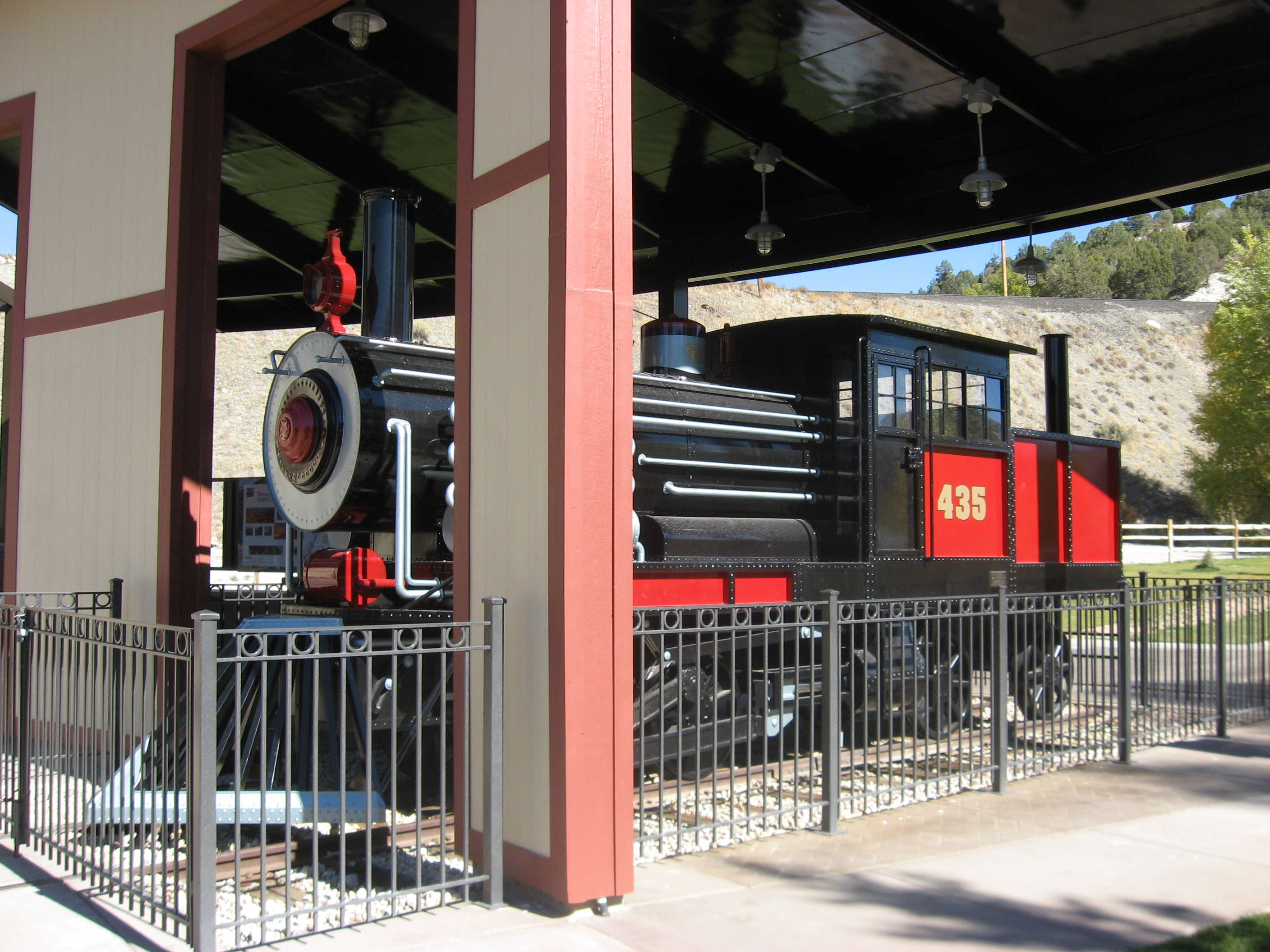
Tie Fork Rest Area along US-6

== History ==
US-6 did not enter Utah until 1936, when it was extended west from Greeley, Colorado, to Long Beach, California. The eastern half in Utah, from Colorado to Spanish Fork, overlapped US-50, but, after a short segment on US-91 to Santaquin, it followed a route that was new to the U.S. Numbered Highway System into Nevada. This road was not yet built to good standards; while it was improved to Hinckley, the remainder across the desert was a graded earth road. It was not paved all the way until 1952, when a new alignment was completed from Hinckley into Nevada; within a few years, US-50 was moved from a long overlap with US-40 (now I-80) south to the new road, completely overlapping US-6 through Utah. US-50 was moved farther south in 1976, due to the completion of I-70 across the San Rafael Swell, separating the two routes between Delta and Green River.

=== Utah Valley to Colorado ===
The road from SR-1 (US-91 by 1926, now at the junction of SR-156 and SR-198) in Spanish Fork southeast via Price and Green River to the Colorado state line became a state highway in 1912, with the final section—Spanish Fork to Colton—being added in May. However, the original route was somewhat longer than present-day US-6, most notably between Price and Green River, where travelers went south from Price to Castle Dale via present SR-10 and then east to Green River via what are now county roads north of the San Rafael River (partly along an old never-used Denver and Rio Grande (D&RG) Railroad grade). Other differences included going southeast from Green River to Valley City and northeast to Thompson Springs. New construction through Price Canyon between Kyune and Castle Gate was made easier by the presence of the D&RG Railroad in the canyon. Later that year, the Midland Trail Association was organized in Grand Junction, Colorado, to promote a transcontinental auto trail that would include this road.

A 1913 law provided state funding to counties to construct the Midland Trail, with a general route defined. Initially it was to follow the present US-6 via Woodside between Price and Green River, but an amendment changed it to the existing state road through Buckhorn Flat (east of Castle Dale). Travelers began using the Midland Trail through eastern Utah in early July 1913, and the road through Price Canyon, replacing a detour via Willow Creek Canyon (US-191) and Emma Park, was completed by the men of Price later that month. A. L. Westgard of the National Highways Association praised the improvements to the road since the previous year, singling out the Price Canyon segment as "almost beyond comprehension". Although it was hoped that it would become part of the Lincoln Highway, the high mountain passes in Colorado convinced that association to designate a route farther north through Wyoming in September 1913. Midland Trail promoters were not discouraged; instead, they were determined to continue to improve to the route to make it better than the Lincoln Highway.

The shorter route via Woodside rather than Castle Dale was considered again in 1916, due to problems with maintaining the latter and a new bridge over the Price River at Woodside, and it was adopted as a state road in April. The piece northwest of Sunnyside Junction had already been designated as part of a state road to Sunnyside, the rest of which still exists as SR-123. A cutoff from Springville south to Moark Junction via Mapleton was also added that year.

A 1919 law redefined the state highway system to include only a short list of roads and any federal-aid projects. At the urging of Grand County, the route that corresponded to the Midland Trail was realigned to the longer but more scenic road along the Colorado River between Moab and Cisco, including the new Dewey Bridge. In response to a Carbon County request, the law also removed Price Canyon from the route, instead taking it along the older road through Willow Creek Canyon and Emma Park. Finally, the older route from Spanish Fork to Moark Junction was dropped in favor of the 1916 addition from Springville. Four years later, both counties had changed their minds, and the legislature changed the route back. The Moab–Cisco River Road was entirely dropped (though it was redesignated in the early 1930s as SR-128), but both the Price Canyon and Emma Park routes remained. Also that year, the Bureau of Public Roads approved Utah's seven percent federal-aid system in accordance with the Federal Aid Highway Act of 1921, including the Springville–Colorado segment of the Midland Trail.

In the 1920s, the State Road Commission of Utah numbered the Springville–Colorado roadway as State Route 8 (SR-8). Several years later, in 1926, it also became part of US-50, which continued east to Annapolis, Maryland (west of Thistle, the road was initially not part of US-50; instead, it was the north end of US-89, which ended at Spanish Fork, leaving the Moark Junction–Springville road as simply SR-8). The legislature officially adopted the SR-8 designation in 1927, dropping the Emma Park alternate and designating two other roads as SR-8: the Spanish Fork–Moark Junction road, which had been dropped in 1919, and a branch from Soldier Creek Junction northeast via Ninemile Canyon to Myton, which had been part of the 1919 system. The Myton spur was split off in 1931 as SR-53, and the Spanish Fork spur became SR-105 in 1945. In 1962, SR-8 was truncated to Green River, with the section east of Green River transferred to SR-4. In 1963, SR-8 extended north to north of Lehi, replacing part of SR-1, which was rerouted on current I-15 as that was constructed. In 1964, SR-105 became part of an extended SR-26. In 1969, the section east of Moark Junction became part of SR-27, leaving SR-8 as the legislative designation for US-89 from north of Lehi to Moark Junction. SR-8, SR-27, and SR-4 were cancelled in the 1977 Utah state route renumbering.

The state completely reconstructed US-50 east of Spanish Fork in 1930 and 1931, eliminating most curves and railroad grade crossings and shortening it by 14 miles (23 km).

=== Utah Valley to Nevada ===
The Grand Central Highway was the local name for the road beginning at the Lincoln Highway in Ely, Nevada, and running east and northeast through Delta and Eureka to the Arrowhead Trail in Santaquin. Due to its avoidance of the Great Salt Lake Desert that the Lincoln Highway passed through, Ely garage owners were promoting it as the best route to Salt Lake City by May 1921. For the same reason—long stretches of desert—Grand Central Highway promoters believed it to be superior to the Arrowhead Trail for Los Angeles-bound travelers. The Eureka Commercial Club posted a billboard in Santaquin in July, advertising the "shortest and best all year route to California". The Midland Trail Association, whose trail followed the Lincoln Highway's route between Salt Lake City and Ely, adopted the Grand Central as an official alternate route in June 1922. The next year, the state legislature added the road from Santaquin to Silver City (southwest of Eureka) to the state highway system, and, in 1925, it was extended to Delta. Along with the road southeast from Delta to Holden, this was designated SR-26 in 1927, and at the same time the road west from Delta to Nevada was added to the system as State Route 27 (SR-27). (The portion in Nevada became SR 14 in 1925.)

In 1925, during early U.S. Numbered Highway System planning, the Grand Central Highway was designated as US-50's path across western Utah. However, when the final plan was approved in late 1926, US-50 had a gap between Ely and Thistle. The gap was filled in about 1930—but via the Wendover Cut-off, far to the north, leaving the Grand Central Highway as only SR-26 and SR-27. The road again received attention in 1932, when the Roosevelt Highway Association was looking for a path for a westward extension of its trail—which had survived the 1920s by being identified with US-6—from Greeley, Colorado, to the West Coast. The association tentatively approved a route in April, entering Utah via US-50 to the Utah Valley and leaving via the Grand Central Highway to Ely. The Delta Lions Club had suggested this alignment for the same reasons that the highway had become popular in the 1920s: cooler weather than the Arrowhead Trail (then US-91). Despite the State Road Commission of Utah designating US-40 across the state as the Roosevelt Highway in 1935, the final route, approved by the American Association of State Highway Officials as US-6 in December 1936, followed US-50 and the Grand Central Highway.

However, the designation did not mean that the road would be immediately improved. It was not until September 1952 that paving was completed west of Delta, largely on a new alignment south of the old road. BusinessWeek described the original route as "nothing but a wagon trail-rutted, filled with dust [...] one of the worst chunks of federal road in the country". A two-day celebration was held in Delta to mark the occasion.

The town of Dividend was bypassed by a new route through Homansville Canyon in about 1931, and the old route (Dividend Road) initially became a branch of SR-26. It was renumbered State Route 159 (SR-159) in 1945 and deleted from the state highway system in 1969. In 1965, SR-26 extended east to SR-8, replacing SR-105. In 1969, SR-27 extended east to Green River, replacing part of SR-26 and part of SR-8.

=== Recent history ===
==== Thistle landslide ====
Starting in early 1983, US-6 was a discontinuous route for eight months, due to a massive landslide that destroyed the town of Thistle. During this time, traffic was routed on two detours. One, via Salina, was over 200 miles (320 km) long and took traffic almost 100 aerial miles (160 km) from the route of US-6. The other, via Duchesne, was shorter. However, this detour traversed steep grades and was not recommended for trucks. The night before the rebuilt US-6 opened, the highway stubs at either side of the landslide were filled with tens of miles of trucks, the drivers tired of the lost revenue from the long detours. The landslide remains the most costly in the history of the U.S.

==== Realignment in Utah Valley ====
Prior to 1995, US-6 passed directly through the cities of Payson, Salem, and Spanish Fork along what is now SR-198, and the four-lane expressway that connected I-15 in northern Spanish Fork southeast with Moark Junction was known as State Route 214 (SR-214), from I-15 to East 800 North, and State Route 105 (SR-105) from East 800 North to Moark Junction. However, in 1995, US-6 was moved onto SR-214, eliminating that route and introducing a concurrency with I-15. The old alignment between Santaquin and Moark Junction became a new SR-198.

== Major intersections ==
| County | Location | mi | km | Exit | Destinations | Notes |
|---|---|---|---|---|---|---|
| Millard | | 0.000 | 0.000 | | US 6 west / US 50 west – Ely | Continuation into Nevada |
| Millard | | 0.665 | 1.070 | | SR-159 | |
| Millard | | 83.897 | 135.019 | | SR-257 | |
| Millard | Delta | 88.302 | 142.108 | | 50 North / 500 West | Interchange; westbound exit and eastbound entrance |
| Millard | Delta | 89.402 | 143.879 | | US 50 east – Fillmore | East end of US-50 overlap; serves Delta Community Medical Center |
| Millard | | 93.846 | 151.030 | | SR-136 | |
| Millard | | 99.720 | 160.484 | | SR-174 | |
| Millard | Lynndyl | 105.630 | 169.995 | | SR-132 | |
| Juab | Tintic Junction | 136.645– 138.403 | 219.909– 222.738 | | SR-36 – Tooele | |
| Utah | Elberta | 149.902 | 241.244 | | SR-68 – Lehi, Salt Lake City | |
| Utah | | 155.935 | 250.953 | | SR-141 | |
| Utah | Santaquin | 160.568 | 258.409 | | I-15 south (Veterans Memorial Highway) / SR-198 east (Main Street east) – Las Vegas | I-15 exit 244; west end of I-15 overlap |
| Utah | Payson | | | 248 | SR-178 – Payson, Salem | Exit numbers follow I-15 |
| Utah | Payson | | | 250 | SR-115 – Payson, Benjamin | |
| Utah | | | | 253 | SR-164 – Spanish Fork, Benjamin | |
| Utah | Spanish Fork | | | 257A | SR-156 (Main Street) – Spanish Fork | Eastbound exit and westbound entrance |
| Utah | Spanish Fork | 173.424 | 279.099 | | I-15 north (Veterans Memorial Highway) – Salt Lake City | I-15 exit 257B; east end of I-15 overlap |
| Utah | Spanish Fork | 177.200 | 285.176 | | SR-198 west (Canyon Road) | |
| Utah | Spanish Fork | 177.950 | 286.383 | | US 89 north – Mapleton, Springville | West end of US-89 overlap |
| Utah | | 187.467 | 301.699 | | US 89 south – Mt. Pleasant, Ephraim, Manti | East end of US-89 overlap |
| Wasatch | No major junctions | | | | | |
| Utah | | 216.169 | 347.890 | | SR-96 | |
| Carbon | | 229.953 | 370.073 | | US 191 north – Duchesne, Vernal | West end of US-191 overlap |
| Carbon | Helper | 232.676 | 374.456 | 232 | US 6 Bus. east (North Main Street) | Interchange |
| Carbon | Helper | 233.323 | 375.497 | | US 6 Bus. west / SR-157 east (Poplar Street) | |
| Carbon | | 235.823 | 379.520 | | SR-139 north to SR-157 – Spring Glen | |
| Carbon | Price | 239.921 | 386.115 | 240 | US 6 Bus. east (SR-55) – Price | Interchange |
| Carbon | Price | 241.168 | 388.122 | 241 | SR-10 south (Carbon Avenue) | Interchange |
| Carbon | Price | 242.470 | 390.218 | 243 | US 6 Bus. west (SR-55) – Price | Interchange |
| Carbon | Wellington | 249.383 | 401.343 | | Nine Mile Canyon Road | Former SR-53 |
| Carbon | Sunnyside Junction | 256.073 | 412.110 | | SR-123 | |
| Emery | | 300.359 | 483.381 | | I-70 / US 50 west – Salina | Trumpet interchange; I-70 exit 157; west end of I-70/US-50 overlap |
| Emery | | | | 160 | I-70 BL / SR-19 east – Green River | Exit numbers follow I-70; I-70 Bus. not signed westbound |
| Grand | | | | 164 | I-70 BL / SR-19 west – Green River | I-70 Bus. not signed eastbound |
| Grand | Crescent Junction | | | 182 | US 191 south – Moab, Crescent Junction | East end of US-191 overlap; former US-160 east |
| Grand | | | | 187 | SR-94 – Thompson Springs | |
| Grand | | | | 204 | SR-128 – Cisco | |
| Grand | | 373.963 | 601.835 | | I-70 east (US 6 / US 50 east) | Continuation into Colorado |
1.000 mi = 1.609 km; 1.000 km = 0.621 mi: Concurrency terminus; Incomplete access

U.S. Route 6
| Previous state: Nevada | Utah | Next state: Colorado |
