= Utah State Route 198 =

State highway in Utah, United States

State Route 198

Route information
- Maintained by UDOT
- Length: 15.715 mi (25.291 km)
- Existed: 1995–present

Major junctions
- West end: I-15 / US 6 in Santaquin
- SR-178 in Payson; SR-115 in Payson; SR-164 in Spanish Fork; SR-156 in Spanish Fork
- East end: US 6 in Spanish Fork

Location
- Country: United States
- State: Utah

Highway system
- Utah State Highway System; Interstate; US; State; Minor; Scenic
← SR-196	→ SR-199

State Route 198 is a highway completely within Utah County in northern Utah that connects Santaquin to Spanish Fork via Payson and Salem. The route runs 16 miles (26 km). The entire length of the route is an old routing of US-6 and US-50; a portion of the route was also US-91. These routes were re-aligned or truncated after the Interstate Highway System was constructed through this part of Utah.

== Route description ==
From its western terminus at Interstate 15 in Santaquin, the route heads north-northeast until reaching Payson, where it straightens out to the north. This portion of the route is 100 West in Payson. Soon after, the highway turns east on State Road. The highway veers northeast and eventually to the north-northeast until Spanish Fork, where it runs north again. The route turns east on Canyon Road, eventually turning to the southeast until reaching US-6, where it terminates.

The brief portion of SR-198 between the SR-164 and SR-156 junctions is listed on the National Highway System.

== History ==
The roads from Santaquin northeast to Spanish Fork and Spanish Fork southeast to Moark Junction were added to the state highway system in the early 1910s. In the 1920s, the former back part of SR-1 and US-91, and the latter part of SR-8 and US-89. The state route designation of the latter portion, which had since become signed as US-6, was changed from SR-8 to State Route 105 in 1945. With the construction of I-15 in the area, SR-1 was moved to the new Interstate in 1964, and the old route from Santaquin to Spanish Fork became an extension of SR-26, which was continued east to Moark Junction, replacing SR-105. The state legislature redesignated this as part of SR-27 in 1969, and in the 1977 renumbering the official state route designation was changed to SR-6, matching signage for US-6. The Utah Transportation Commission submitted a request for a realignment to the American Association of State Highway Officials (AASHTO) in 1994, moving US-6 onto I-15 and SR-214 in order to follow AASHTO policies for following the "shortest routes and the best roads". AASHTO approved this change in November, and in April 1995 the state officially moved US-6, with the old alignment becoming State Route 198.

== Major intersections ==
The entire route is in Utah County.

Location	mi	km	Destinations	Notes
Santaquin	0.000	0.000	I-15 / US 6 – Nephi, Provo	Western terminus
Payson	4.385	7.057	SR-178 west (West 800 South)	
Payson	5.391	8.676	SR-115 north (Main Street)	
Spanish Fork	11.540	18.572	SR-164 west (Arrowhead Trail)	
Spanish Fork	13.342	21.472	SR-156 north	Former separation of US-6/50 with US-91
Spanish Fork	15.715	25.291	US 6 – Spanish Fork, Price	Eastern terminus
1.000 mi = 1.609 km; 1.000 km = 0.621 mi
