= Kyune, Utah =

Ghost town in Utah County, Utah, United States

Kyune
- Ghost town
- Location within Utah Location within the United States
- Coordinates: 39°49′34″N 110°56′42″W
- Country: United States
- State: Utah
- County: Utah
- Elevation: 7,090 ft (2,160 m)
- GNIS feature ID: 1442370

Kyune is a ghost town located along the Price River (roughly 10 miles [16 km] southeast of Soldier Summit and approximately 11 miles (18 km) north–northwest of Helper in extreme southeastern Utah County, Utah, United States.

== See also ==
- List of ghost towns in Utah
