= Genola, Utah =

Town in Utah County, Utah, United States

Genola
- Town
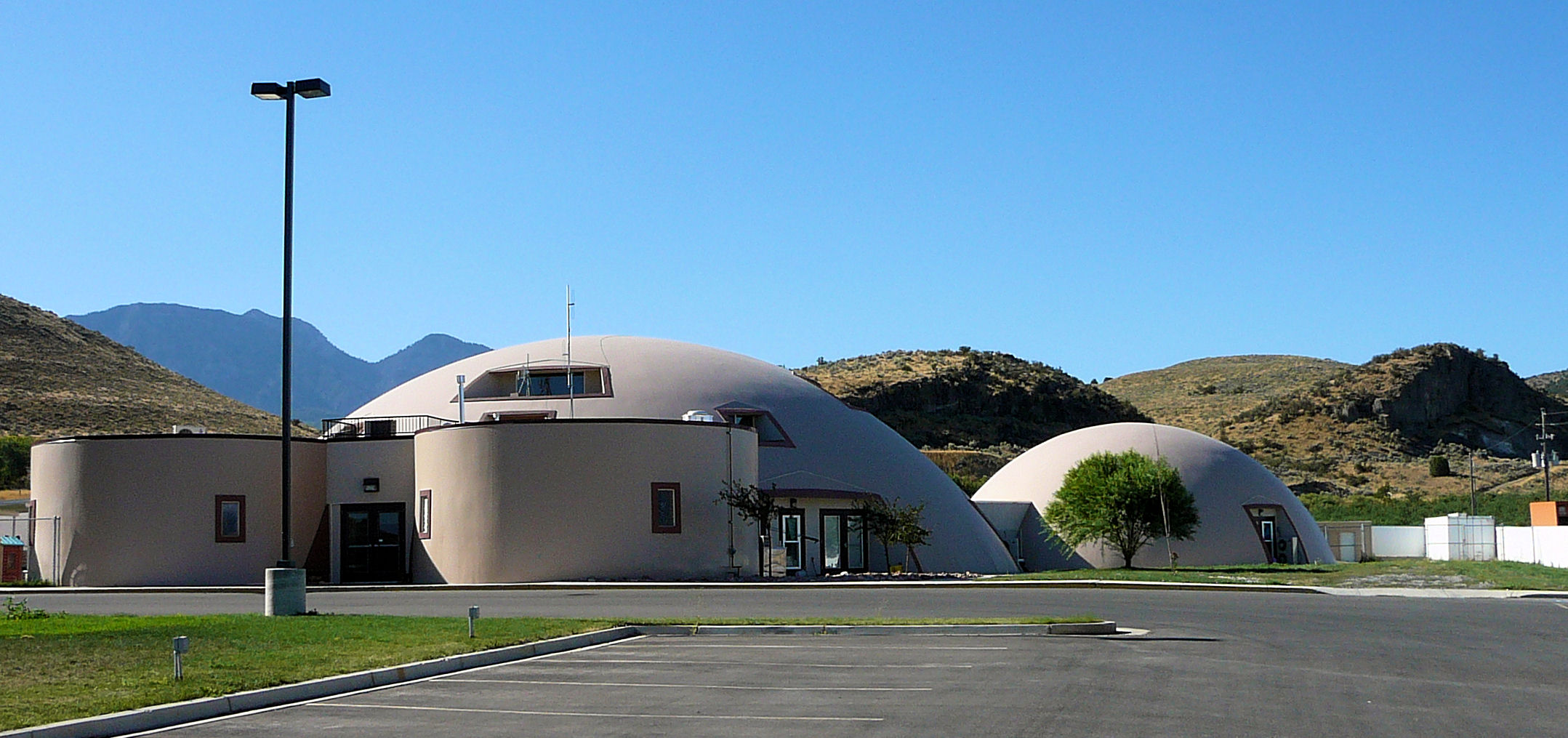
- Centro de la Familia de Utah Migrant Head Start Center in Genola, August 2007

- Location in Utah County and the State of Utah
- Coordinates: 40°00′35″N 111°50′51″W
- Country: United States
- State: Utah
- County: Utah County
- Incorporated: December 29, 1935

Area
  - Total: 14.19 sq mi (36.75 km^{2})
  - Land: 13.76 sq mi (35.63 km^{2})
  - Water: 0.43 sq mi (1.11 km^{2})
- Elevation: 4,518 ft (1,377 m)

Population (2020)
  - Total: 1,548
  - Density: 112.5/sq mi (43.45/km^{2})
- Time zone: UTC-7 (Mountain (MST))
  - Summer (DST): UTC-6 (MDT)
- ZIP code: 84655
- Area codes: 385, 801
- FIPS code: 49-28810
- GNIS feature ID: 2412676
- Website: genolaut.gov

Genola (/dʒəˈnoʊlə/ jə-NOH-lə) is a town in Utah County, Utah, United States. It is part of the Provo–Orem metropolitan area. The population was 1,548 at the 2020 census.

== Geography ==
According to the United States Census Bureau, the town has a total area of 13.9 square miles (35.9 km^{2}), of which 13.4 square miles (34.8 km^{2}) is land and 0.42 square miles (1.1 km^{2}), or 3.10%, is water.

The town is located in the northeast Goshen Valley; Santaquin is adjacent to the southeast. The former area of Townsend is located within the southeast area of Genola.

== Demographics ==
Historical population
Census	Pop.	Note	%±
1920	194		—
1930	321		65.5%
1940	325		1.2%
1950	314		−3.4%
1960	380		21.0%
1970	424		11.6%
1980	630		48.6%
1990	803		27.5%
2000	965		20.2%
2010	1,370		42.0%
2020	1,548		13.0%
Source: U.S. Census Bureau

=== 2020 census ===
As of the 2020 census, Genola had a population of 1,548. The median age was 30.8 years. 36.0% of residents were under the age of 18 and 10.8% of residents were 65 years of age or older. For every 100 females there were 104.2 males, and for every 100 females age 18 and over there were 104.5 males age 18 and over.

0.0% of residents lived in urban areas, while 100.0% lived in rural areas.

There were 405 households in Genola, of which 52.1% had children under the age of 18 living in them. Of all households, 76.8% were married-couple households, 11.9% were households with a male householder and no spouse or partner present, and 9.4% were households with a female householder and no spouse or partner present. About 10.8% of all households were made up of individuals and 4.7% had someone living alone who was 65 years of age or older.

There were 421 housing units, of which 3.8% were vacant. The homeowner vacancy rate was 0.5% and the rental vacancy rate was 9.1%.

Racial composition as of the 2020 census
Race	Number	Percent
White	1,425	92.1%
Black or African American	1	0.1%
American Indian and Alaska Native	12	0.8%
Asian	1	0.1%
Native Hawaiian and Other Pacific Islander	3	0.2%
Some other race	39	2.5%
Two or more races	67	4.3%
Hispanic or Latino (of any race)	92	5.9%

=== 2000 census ===
As of the 2000 census, there were 965 people, 224 households, and 196 families residing in the town. The population density was 75.7 people per square mile (29.2/km^{2}). There were 242 housing units at an average density of 19.0 per square mile (7.3/km^{2}). The racial makeup of the town was 92.54% White, 0.73% Native American, 0.41% Asian, 5.39% from other races, and 0.93% from two or more races. Hispanic or Latino of any race were 8.08% of the population.

There were 224 households, out of which 59.4% had children under 18 living with them, 79.9% were married couples living together, 6.3% had a female householder with no husband present, and 12.1% were non-families. 11.2% of all households were made up of individuals, and 7.6% had someone living alone who was 65 years of age or older. The average household size was 4.18, and the average family size was 4.55.

In the town, the population was spread out, with 44.4% under 18, 9.0% from 18 to 24, 21.6% from 25 to 44, 16.9% from 45 to 64, and 8.2% who were 65 years of age or older. The median age was 22 years. For every 100 females, there were 115.9 males. For every 100 females aged 18 and over, there were 115.7 males.

The median income for a household in the town was $45,417, and the median income for a family was $50,125. Males had a median income of $31,563 versus $25,833 for females. The per capita income for the town was $13,484. About 4.4% of families and 9.9% of the population were below the poverty line, including 12.1% of those under age 18 and 2.5% of those aged 65 or over.

== See also ==
- List of municipalities in Utah
- Tintic Standard Reduction Mill
