= Lake Shore, Utah =

- CDP
- Location in Utah County and the state of Utah
- Coordinates: 40°07′30″N 111°44′37″W
- Country: United States
- State: Utah
- County: Utah
- Settled: 1860
- Founder: Benjamin Franklin Barney
- Named for: Utah Lake

Area
  - Total: 10.9 sq mi (28.3 km^{2})
  - Land: 10.9 sq mi (28.3 km^{2})
  - Water: 0 sq mi (0.0 km^{2})
- Elevation: 4,511 ft (1,375 m)

Population (2020)
  - Total: 802
  - Density: 73.4/sq mi (28.3/km^{2})
- Time zone: UTC-7 (Mountain (MST))
  - Summer (DST): UTC-6 (MDT)
- ZIP code: 84660
- Area code: 801
- FIPS code: 49-42230
- GNIS feature ID: 2408551

Lake Shore is a census-designated place (CDP) in Utah County, Utah, United States. It is part of the Provo–Orem Metropolitan Statistical Area. The population was 802 at the 2020 census.

== Geography ==
According to the United States Census Bureau, the CDP has a total area of 10.9 square miles (28.3 km^{2}), of which 10.9 square miles (28.3 km^{2}) is land and 0.08% is water.

== Demographics ==
Historical population
Census	Pop.	Note	%±
1890	300		—
1900	582		94.0%
1910	528		−9.3%
1920	457		−13.4%
1930	482		5.5%
1940	528		9.5%
1950	523		−0.9%
2000	755		—
2010	817		8.2%
2020	802		−1.8%
Source: U.S. Census Bureau

As of the census of 2000, there were 755 people, 201 households, and 177 families residing in the CDP. The population density was 67.9 people per square mile (26.2/km^{2}). There were 210 housing units at an average density of 18.9/sq mi (7.3/km^{2}). The racial makeup of the CDP was 97.09% White, 0.53% Asian, 0.13% Pacific Islander, 1.06% from other races, and 1.19% from two or more races. Hispanic or Latino of any race were 3.05% of the population.

There were 201 households, out of which 50.2% had children under the age of 18 living with them, 81.6% were married couples living together, 3.0% had a female householder with no husband present, and 11.9% were non-families. 10.0% of all households were made up of individuals, and 7.5% had someone living alone who was 65 years of age or older. The average household size was 3.76 and the average family size was 4.04.

In the CDP, the population was spread out, with 36.0% under the age of 18, 14.4% from 18 to 24, 23.3% from 25 to 44, 17.0% from 45 to 64, and 9.3% who were 65 years of age or older. The median age was 25 years. For every 100 females, there were 108.6 males. For every 100 females age 18 and over, there were 105.5 males.

The median income for a household in the CDP was $57,212, and the median income for a family was $57,212. Males had a median income of $35,714 versus $16,429 for females. The per capita income for the CDP was $22,329. About 2.3% of families and 4.3% of the population were below the poverty line, including 7.7% of those under age 18 and none of those age 65 or over.

== See also ==
- List of census-designated places in Utah
