= Benjamin, Utah =

- CDP
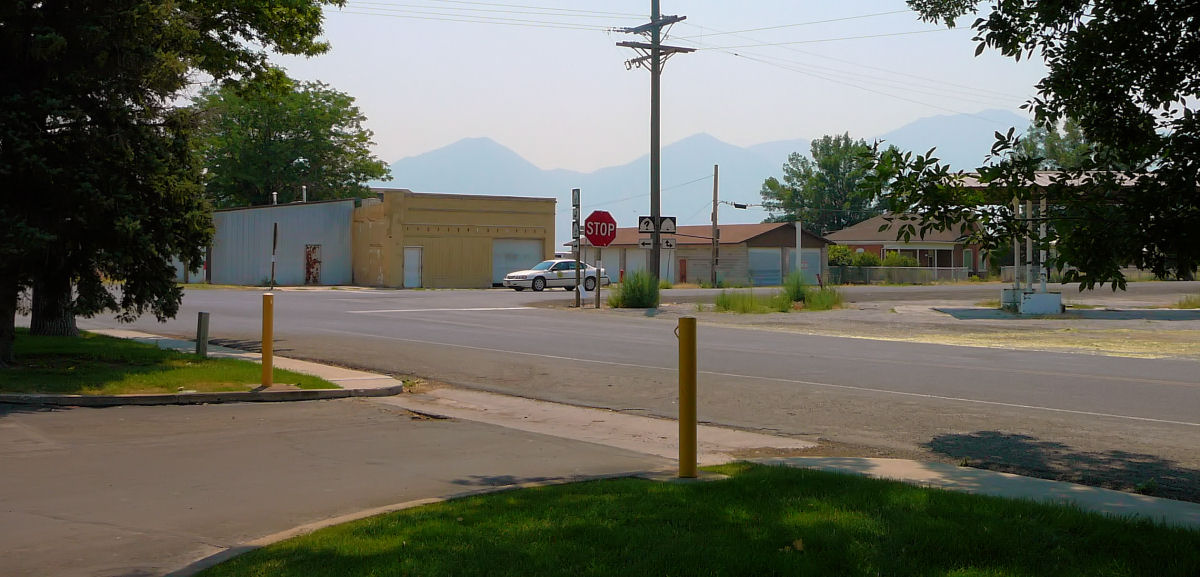
- The center of town

- Location in Utah County and the state of Utah
- Coordinates: 40°05′49″N 111°44′34″W
- Country: United States
- State: Utah
- County: Utah
- Founded: 1860
- Founder: Benjamin Franklin Stewart

Area
  - Total: 12.4 sq mi (32.0 km^{2})
  - Land: 12.4 sq mi (32.0 km^{2})
  - Water: 0 sq mi (0.0 km^{2})
- Elevation: 4,534 ft (1,382 m)

Population (2020)
  - Total: 1,196
  - Density: 96.8/sq mi (37.4/km^{2})
- Time zone: UTC-7 (Mountain (MST))
  - Summer (DST): UTC-6 (MDT)
- ZIP code: 84660
- Area code: 801
- FIPS code: 49-04720
- GNIS feature ID: 2407828

Benjamin is a census-designated place (CDP) in Utah County, Utah, United States. It is part of the Provo–Orem Metropolitan Statistical Area. The population was 1,196 at the 2020 census.

== History ==
The first settlement at Benjamin was made circa 1860. A post office called Benjamin was established in 1892, and remained in operation until 1902. The community has the name of Benjamin F. Stewart, a first settler.

Some residents made a request in February 2009 to make Benjamin an incorporated town, in an effort to prevent annexation by the neighboring cities of Salem, Spanish Fork, and Payson.

== Geography ==
According to the United States Census Bureau, the CDP has a total area of 12.4 square miles (32 km^{2}), all land.

== Demographics ==
As of the census of 2000, there were 1,029 people, 299 households, and 269 families residing in the CDP. The population density was 83.3 people per square mile (32.2/km^{2}). There were 310 housing units at an average density of 25.1/sq mi (9.7/km^{2}). The racial makeup of the CDP was 98.64% White, 0.49% Native American, 0.19% Pacific Islander, 0.39% from other races, and 0.29% from two or more races. Hispanic or Latino of any race were 1.46% of the population.

There were 299 households, out of which 45.8% had children under the age of 18 living with them, 81.3% were married couples living together, 7.0% had a female householder with no husband present, and 9.7% were non-families. 9.0% of all households were made up of individuals, and 7.0% had someone living alone who was 65 years of age or older. The average household size was 3.44 and the average family size was 3.67.

In the CDP, the population was spread out, with 33.3% under the age of 18, 10.8% from 18 to 24, 24.2% from 25 to 44, 21.3% from 45 to 64, and 10.4% who were 65 years of age or older. The median age was 30 years. For every 100 females, there were 104.6 males. For every 100 females age 18 and over, there were 102.4 males.

The median income for a household in the CDP was $46,458, and the median income for a family was $55,238. Males had a median income of $34,643 versus $21,151 for females. The per capita income for the CDP was $18,569. None of the families and 2.2% of the population were living below the poverty line, including no under eighteens and 9.2% of those over 64.

== See also ==
- List of census-designated places in Utah
