= Utah County, Utah =

County in Utah, United States

- County
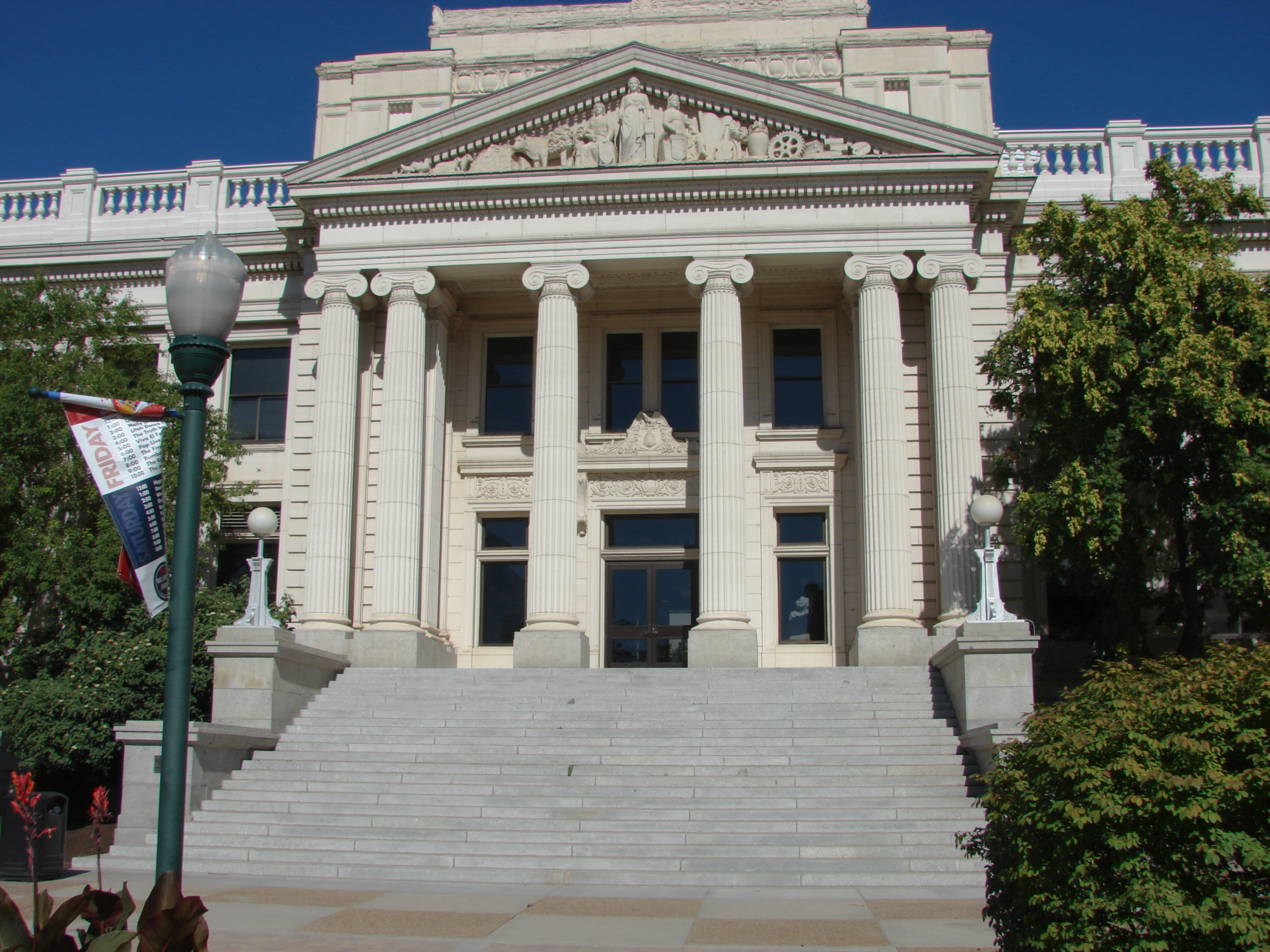
- Historic Utah County Courthouse

- Flag

- Location within the U.S. state of Utah
- Coordinates: 40.12°N 111.67°W
- Country: United States
- State: Utah
- Founded: January 31, 1850 (created); April 18, 1852 (organized)
- Named for: Ute Tribe
- Seat: Provo
- Largest city: Provo

Area
  - Total: 2,144 sq mi (5,550 km^{2})
  - Land: 2,003 sq mi (5,190 km^{2})
  - Water: 141 sq mi (370 km^{2}) 6.6%

Population (2020)
  - Total: 659,399
  - Estimate (2025): 759,859 ▲
  - Density: 329.2/sq mi (127.1/km^{2})
- Time zone: UTC−7 (Mountain)
  - Summer (DST): UTC−6 (MDT)
- Congressional districts: 3rd, 4th
- Website: www.utahcounty.gov

Utah County is the second-most populous county in the U.S. state of Utah. The county seat and largest city is Provo, which is the state's fourth-largest city, and the largest outside of Salt Lake County. As of the 2020 United States census, the population was 659,399.

Utah County is one of two counties forming the Provo-Orem-Lehi metropolitan area, and is part of the larger Salt Lake City-Provo-Ogden Combined Statistical Area. In 2020, the center of population of Utah was in Utah County, in the city of Saratoga Springs.

Utah County is one of the fastest-growing counties in the United States, ranking among the top ten counties in numerical growth. Correspondingly, Provo–Orem is among the top eight metropolitan areas by percentage growth in the country.

Utah County is one of seven counties in the United States to have the same name as its state. The other six counties are Arkansas County, Hawaii County, Idaho County, Iowa County, Oklahoma County and New York County (commonly known as Manhattan).

== History ==
The legislature of the State of Deseret created a county on January 31, 1850, to govern the civic affairs of Utah Valley, which by the 1850s was bustling with newly arrived settlers. The county name is derived from the valley name, which is derived from the Spanish name (Yuta) for the Ute Indians. The State of Deseret dissolved soon after (April 5, 1851), but the counties it had set in place continued. There is little record of any official activity conducted by the fledgling county until April 18, 1852, when a full slate of county officials was published, and recordkeeping began. The first courthouse was built in central Provo in 1866–67. It was soon outgrown and was replaced by a second courthouse (1872–73). By the 1920s, this building was also cramped, and the decision was made to erect a combined city-county building, which was completed in 1926.

The county's boundaries were adjusted in 1852, 1854, 1856, 1862, 1880, and 1884. It has retained its present boundary since 1884.

== Geography ==
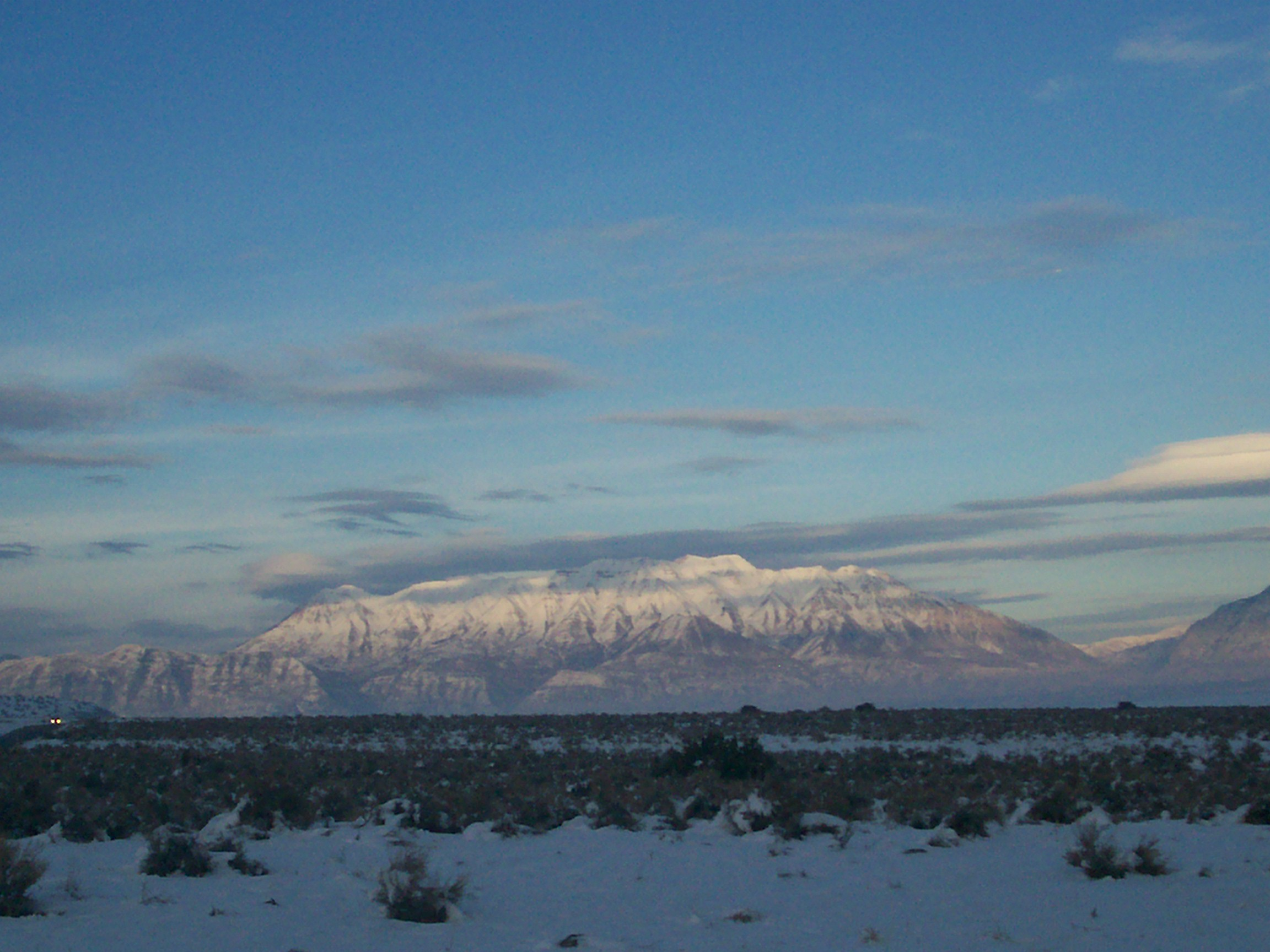
Mount Timpanogos in the Wasatch Range is visible from much of Utah County.

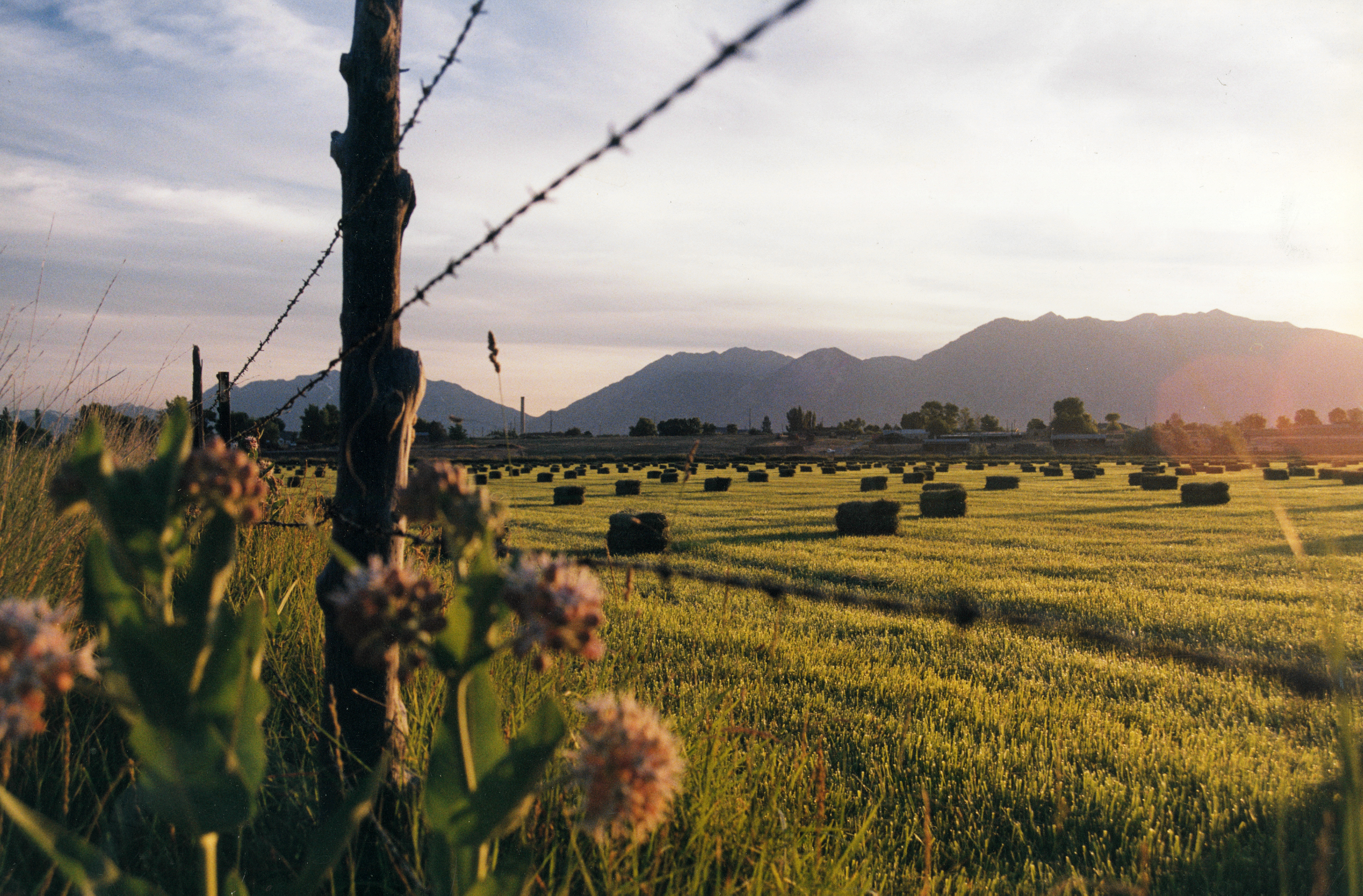
A partial view of Utah Valley seen here from outside of Salem

Utah County terrain ranges from steep mountain ranges in the east (the Wasatch Range), dropping steeply to a large lake-filled valley. Most of the comparatively level ground is dedicated to agriculture or developed uses, while most of the steep terrain is covered with arid-climate forestation. The county generally slopes to the west and north, with its highest point (the northern peak of the twin-peaked Mt. Nebo in the southern part of the county), at 11,928 ft (3,636 m) ASL. The county has an area of 2,144 square miles (5,550 km^{2}), of which 2,003 square miles (5,190 km^{2}) is land and 141 square miles (370 km^{2}) (6.6%) is water.

Utah Valley lies at the center of the county, lined by the mountains of the Wasatch Range on the east. Utah Lake occupies a large part of the valley. The elevation ranges from 4,487 feet (1,368 m) above sea level at the lake to 11,928 feet (3,636 m) at the peak of Mount Nebo.

=== Major highways ===
- Interstate 15
- U.S. Route 6
- U.S. Route 89
- U.S. Route 189
- Utah State Route 68
- Utah State Route 73
- Utah State Route 77
- Utah State Route 85
- Utah State Route 92
- Utah State Route 146
- Utah State Route 147
- Utah State Route 198

=== Protected areas ===
- Ashley National Forest (part)
- Black Hawk Campground (US Forest Service)
- Finish of the Provo River Parkway
- Manti-La Sal National Forest (part)
- Mount Timpanogos
- Powell Slough Waterfowl Management Area
- Rock Island Waterfowl Management Area
- Scofield State Park (part)
- Starvation Wildlife Management Area
- Timpanogos Cave National Monument
- Uinta-Wasatch-Cache National Forest (part)
- Utah Lake State Park

=== Lakes ===
- Utah Lake
- Provo Bay (an extension of Utah Lake)
- Scofield Reservoir (part)

== Demographics ==
Historical population
Census	Pop.	Note	%±
1850	2,026		—
1860	8,248		307.1%
1870	12,203		48.0%
1880	17,973		47.3%
1890	23,768		32.2%
1900	32,456		36.6%
1910	37,942		16.9%
1920	40,792		7.5%
1930	49,021		20.2%
1940	57,382		17.1%
1950	81,912		42.7%
1960	106,991		30.6%
1970	137,776		28.8%
1980	218,106		58.3%
1990	263,590		20.9%
2000	368,540		39.8%
2010	516,564		40.2%
2020	659,399		27.7%
2025 (est.)	759,859	▲	15.2%
US Decennial Census; 1790–1960; 1900–1990; 1990–2000; 2010–2020

Utah County racial composition
Race or Ethnicity	2020	2010	2000	1990	1950	1900
White	81.6%	89.4%	95.7%	96.4%	99.6%	99.9%
—Non-Hispanic	78.6%	84.2%	87.7%	94.8%	n/a	n/a
Black or African American	0.7%	0.5%	0.4%	0.1%	0.02%	0.02%
Hispanic or Latino (of any race)	13.4%	10.8%	8.4%	3.0%	n/a	n/a
Asian	1.6%	1.4%	1.2%	1.0%	n/a	n/a
Hawaiian & Pacific Islander	1.0%	0.8%	0.6%	0.5%	n/a	n/a
Native American	2.0%	1.0%	0.6%	0.7%	n/a	0.01%
Multiracial	9.0%	2.7%	1.4%^{[1]}	n/a	n/a	n/a

^{1} The 2000 census was the first to allow residents to select multiple race categories. Prior to 2000, the census used the category 'Other Race' as a catch-all identifier. For county-level census data in 1950 and 1900, Utah counted all non-White and non-Black residents using this category. 'Other races' formed 1.4% of Utah County's population in 1990, 0.43% in 1950, and 0.07% in 1900.

Utah County, Utah – Racial and ethnic composition Note: the US Census treats Hispanic/Latino as an ethnic category. This table excludes Latinos from the racial categories and assigns them to a separate category. Hispanics/Latinos may be of any race.
Race / Ethnicity (NH = Non-Hispanic)	Pop 2000	Pop 2010	Pop 2020	% 2000	% 2010	% 2020
White alone (NH)	328,797	434,708	518,460	89.22%	84.15%	78.63%
Black or African American alone (NH)	1,002	2,421	4,110	0.27%	0.47%	0.62%
Native American or Alaska Native alone (NH)	1,881	2,374	2,533	0.51%	0.46%	0.38%
Asian alone (NH)	3,855	6,912	10,111	1.05%	1.34%	1.53%
Pacific Islander alone (NH)	2,089	3,817	6,541	0.57%	0.74%	0.99%
Other race alone (NH)	328	631	2,421	0.09%	0.12%	0.37%
Mixed race or Multiracial (NH)	4,793	9,908	26,692	1.30%	1.92%	4.05%
Hispanic or Latino (any race)	25,791	55,793	88,531	7.00%	10.80%	13.43%
Total	368,536	516,564	659,399	100.00%	100.00%	100.00%

=== 2020 census ===
According to the 2020 United States census and 2020 American Community Survey, there were 659,399 people in Utah County with a population density of 329.0 people per square mile (127.0/km^{2}). Among non-Hispanic or Latino people, the racial makeup was 518,460 (78.6%) White, 4,110 (0.6%) African American, 2,533 (0.4%) Native American, 10,111 (1.5%) Asian, 6,541 (1.0%) Pacific Islander, 2,421 (0.4%) from other races, and 26,692 (4.0%) from two or more races. 88,531 (13.4%) people were Hispanic or Latino.

There were 330,884 (50.18%) males and 328,515 (49.82%) females, and the population distribution by age was 216,133 (32.8%) under the age of 18, 389,673 (59.1%) from 18 to 64, and 53,593 (8.1%) who were at least 65 years old. The median age was 25.9 years.

There were 184,558 households in Utah County with an average size of 3.57 of which 148,476 (80.4%) were families and 36,082 (19.6%) were non-families. Among all families, 124,424 (67.4%) were married couples, 8,394 (4.5%) were male householders with no spouse, and 15,658 (8.5%) were female householders with no spouse. Among all non-families, 23,748 (12.9%) were a single person living alone and 12,334 (6.7%) were two or more people living together. 88,011 (47.7%) of all households had children under the age of 18. 124,353 (67.4%) of households were owner-occupied while 60,205 (32.6%) were renter-occupied.

The median income for a Utah County household was $77,057 and the median family income was $83,938, with a per-capita income of $27,365. The median income for males that were full-time employees was $60,356 and for females $37,391. 10.0% of the population and 6.9% of families were below the poverty line.

In terms of education attainment, out of the 310,161 people in Utah County 25 years or older, 14,999 (4.8%) had not completed high school, 51,916 (16.7%) had a high school diploma or equivalency, 115,689 (37.3%) had some college or associate degree, 88,312 (28.5%) had a bachelor's degree, and 39,245 (12.7%) had a graduate or professional degree.

=== Ancestry ===
Most Reported Ancestries in Utah County (2020)
Ancestry	Percentage of Population^{1}
Other European-Americans	30.6%
English	28.1%
American or Unclassified	22.7%
Other British (including Scottish & Welsh)	10.5%
German	10.5%
Mexican	7.7%
Irish	5%
Other Latin American	4.3%
Middle Eastern or North African	0.3%

^{1} Due to respondents reporting multiple ethnicities, percentages may add up to greater than 100%.

=== Religion ===
Religion in Utah County as of 2020
Religion	Percent
Latter-day Saints	72%
None	13%
Protestant	9%
Catholic	5%
Other faiths	1%

== Government ==
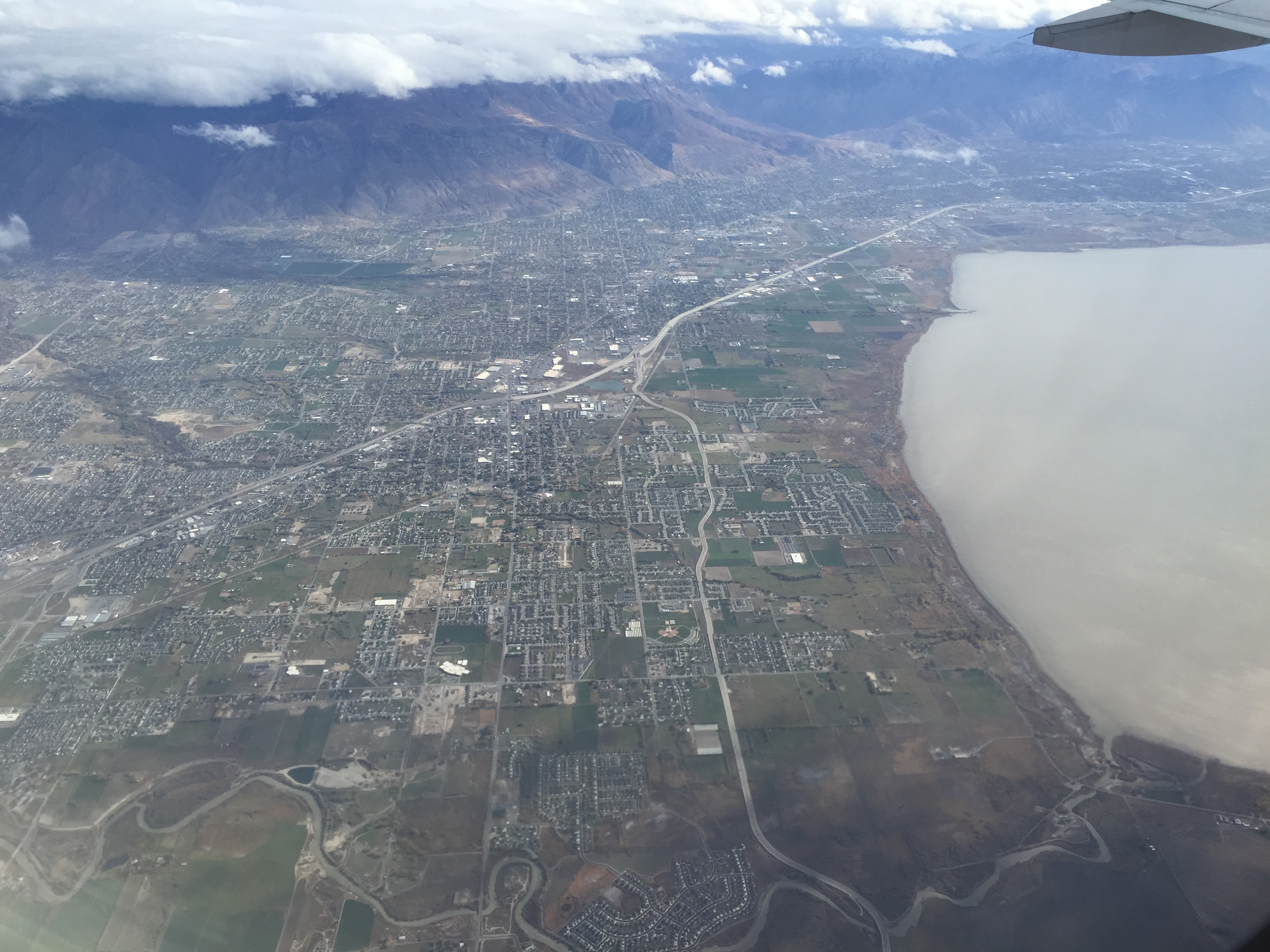
View of the cities of Lehi, American Fork, Pleasant Grove, Lindon and Orem along Interstate 15 and the northeast shore of Utah Lake

The government is a three-member elected county commission elected at-large. Other elected officials include the county sheriff, the county clerk, county recorder, county assessor, county surveyor, county treasurer, and the county attorney. The current county attorney is Jeff Gray.

In 2020, Utah County voters rejected Proposition 9, which would have changed the county's government to a five-member elected county council with an elected county mayor.

The first sheriff of the county was John T. Willis, who was succeeded by William Madison Wall. Alexander Williams served during John Cradlebaugh's court in 1859. He was succeeded by Eli Whipple, who resigned in 1861 and was replaced by Russell Kelly. In 2020, Sheriff Mike Smith publicly stated he would not enforce COVID-19 face mask mandates.

The Utah County Fire Department provides emergency response to all unincorporated areas within Utah County and works with all the incorporated cities within the county plus all Utah state and federal lands. The department is primarily a wildland fires response and urban interspace service with some structure fire and HAZMAT abatement capability.

=== Politics ===
United States presidential election results for Utah County, Utah
Year	Republican		Democratic		Third party(ies)	
Year	No.	%	No.	%	No.	%
1896	2,039	21.66%	7,375	78.34%	0	0.00%
1900	5,698	50.97%	5,391	48.22%	90	0.81%
1904	6,490	59.15%	4,243	38.67%	239	2.18%
1908	6,373	54.82%	4,984	42.87%	269	2.31%
1912	4,185	35.45%	4,636	39.26%	2,986	25.29%
1916	5,201	37.45%	8,235	59.30%	451	3.25%
1920	7,752	53.34%	6,377	43.88%	403	2.77%
1924	6,946	46.28%	5,226	34.82%	2,838	18.91%
1928	8,771	52.19%	7,955	47.33%	81	0.48%
1932	7,953	38.73%	12,140	59.12%	443	2.16%
1936	6,173	29.83%	14,387	69.52%	135	0.65%
1940	8,740	36.48%	15,168	63.32%	48	0.20%
1944	9,946	38.68%	15,722	61.14%	45	0.18%
1948	13,395	44.82%	16,191	54.18%	300	1.00%
1952	20,913	57.71%	15,327	42.29%	0	0.00%
1956	25,371	66.56%	12,747	33.44%	0	0.00%
1960	23,057	53.99%	19,626	45.95%	25	0.06%
1964	20,912	46.63%	23,936	53.37%	0	0.00%
1968	29,226	59.01%	16,629	33.57%	3,673	7.42%
1972	42,179	70.94%	10,828	18.21%	6,453	10.85%
1976	49,328	69.48%	18,327	25.82%	3,338	4.70%
1980	71,859	83.44%	12,166	14.13%	2,096	2.43%
1984	72,284	82.61%	14,801	16.91%	419	0.48%
1988	68,134	77.23%	18,533	21.01%	1,560	1.77%
1992	61,398	56.76%	14,090	13.02%	32,690	30.22%
1996	69,653	71.05%	18,291	18.66%	10,087	10.29%
2000	98,255	81.70%	16,445	13.67%	5,556	4.62%
2004	128,269	85.99%	17,357	11.64%	3,547	2.38%
2008	122,224	77.71%	29,567	18.80%	5,488	3.49%
2012	156,950	88.32%	17,281	9.72%	3,482	1.96%
2016	102,182	50.18%	28,522	14.01%	72,938	35.82%
2020	192,812	67.78%	76,033	26.73%	15,635	5.50%
2024	203,476	68.25%	84,937	28.49%	9,730	3.26%

Utah County has been referred to as "the most Republican county in the most Republican state in the United States". It has voted for a Democratic presidential candidate nine times since statehood, but has not done so since 1964.

In the 1992 presidential election, George H. W. Bush received the most votes and Bill Clinton was third in votes received. In the 2004 presidential election, 85.99% voted for George W. Bush. In the 2008 U.S. presidential election, the county voted for John McCain by a 58.9% margin over Barack Obama, compared to McCain winning by 28.1% statewide. Eight other Utah counties voted more strongly in favor of McCain. In the 2012 election, Mitt Romney received 88.32% of the vote. In 2016, it gave a slim majority of the vote to Donald Trump, and nearly 30% of the vote to independent candidate Evan McMullin, who outperformed Hillary Clinton in the county. This was McMullin's largest share of the vote in any county in Utah and his second best nationwide after Madison County, Idaho. In 2020, Democratic candidate Joe Biden received over 75,000 votes, easily a record for the party – no Democratic candidate had previously received more than 30,000 votes in the county – but it amounted to barely a quarter of the county vote as Trump received two-thirds of the total.

Until 2013, Utah County was represented entirely by one congressional district. Currently, the county is split between two congressional districts. Most of the county's population is in the 3rd District, represented by Republican Mike Kennedy, former Provo Mayor. Much of the county's area however, including Utah Lake, resides in the 4th District currently represented by Republican Burgess Owens.

The county's Republican bent runs right through state and local politics. All five state senators representing the county, as well as all 14 state representatives, are Republicans.

State Elected Offices
Position	District	Name	Affiliation	First Elected
Senate	7	Mike McKell	Republican	2020
Senate	11	Daniel McCay	Republican	2018
Senate	13	Jake Anderegg	Republican	2016
Senate	14	Mike Kennedy	Republican	2020
Senate	15	Keith Grover	Republican	2018
Senate	16	Curt Bramble	Republican	2000
Senate	24	Derrin Owens	Republican	2020
Senate	27	David Hinkins	Republican	2008
House of Representatives	2	Jefferson Moss	Republican	2016
House of Representatives	6	Cory Maloy	Republican	2016
House of Representatives	27	Brady Brammer	Republican	2018
House of Representatives	48	Keven Stratton	Republican	2012
House of Representatives	56	Kay Christofferson	Republican	2012
House of Representatives	57	Jon Hawkins	Republican	2018
House of Representatives	59	Val Peterson	Republican	2010
House of Representatives	60	Nelson Abbott	Republican	2020
House of Representatives	61	Marsha Judkins	Republican	2018
House of Representatives	63	Adam Robertson	Republican	2018
House of Representatives	64	Norm Thurston	Republican	2014
House of Representatives	65	Stephen Whyte	Republican	2021
House of Representatives	66	Jeff Burton	Republican	2020
House of Representatives	67	Doug Welton	Republican	2020
House of Representatives	68	Merrill Nelson	Republican	2012
Board of Education	9	Cindy Davis	Nonpartisan	2018
Board of Education	11	Natalie Cline	Republican	2020
Board of Education	12	James Moss Jr.	Republican	2020
Board of Education	13	Randy Boothe	Republican	2020
Board of Education	14	Mark Huntsman	Nonpartisan	2014

== Social issues ==
Utah County saw high rates of opioid and other prescription drug addiction from the mid-2000s onwards, foreshadowing the national opioid epidemic. The 2008 documentary Happy Valley examined the problem.

Giving USA, which reports on charitable giving in the US, named Utah County as one of the three most generous counties in philanthropic donations, alongside San Juan County, Utah and Madison County, Idaho.

In 2019, one in eight people and one in six children in the county did not have sufficient food.

== Infrastructure ==
Much of Utah's transportation infrastructure was built to support automobiles. Prior to the 1950s, Utah County relied on the U.S. Highway System for local transportation. When I-15 was built in 1956 (parallel to Highway 89), it became the dominant transportation vein in the state. The I-15 CORE project added multiple lanes on I-15 through most of Utah County. This expanded 24 miles (39 km) of freeway and was completed in 2012. Other construction projects by UDOT have been done on I-15 since then, including the Technology Corridor project and the Point of the Mountain project. However, the highway system retains its significance in Utah County due to the mountainous terrain. Highway 6 is the closest major road connecting Colorado to the Wasatch Front, running through Spanish Fork Canyon before converging with I-15 in the city of Spanish Fork. Portions of Highway 89 have become prominent local roads known collectively as 'State Street'. Highway 189 is known as 'University Avenue' in the city of Provo, and runs through Provo Canyon into Heber in neighboring Wasatch County.

Utah County has seen significant growth in public transportation over the past 15 years, owing in part to the county's large student population of more than 70,000 commuting to-and-from Brigham Young University (BYU) in Provo and Utah Valley University (UVU) in Orem. The two cities jointly operate UVX, a bus rapid transit system, as part of their city bus routes. Provo also serves as the southernmost terminus of the FrontRunner, Utah's intrastate commuter rail service. The Provo FrontRunner station is located on South University Avenue, directly southwest of Amtrak's Provo Station—which is Utah's third westbound stop, after Green River and Helper, for the California Zephyr Amtrak route. In addition to Provo, The FrontRunner currently has three stops in the county. The Orem FrontRunner station is located on the west side of I-15, served by a pedestrian bridge over the freeway that connects the UVU campus directly to the station. An additional stop in Vineyard, Utah was completed in August 2022. Utah County also operates the American Fork FrontRunner Station and the Lehi FrontRunner Station located near Thanksgiving Point. From Lehi, the FrontRunner leaves Utah County and enters Salt Lake County.

== Education ==
=== School districts ===
School districts include:

- Alpine School District
- Provo School District
- Nebo School District

=== Colleges and universities ===
Four-year institutions

- Brigham Young University (private)
- Utah Valley University (public)
- Provo College (private for-profit)
- Rocky Mountain University of Health Professions (private for-profit)

Two-year institutions

- Mountainland Technical College (public)

== Communities ==
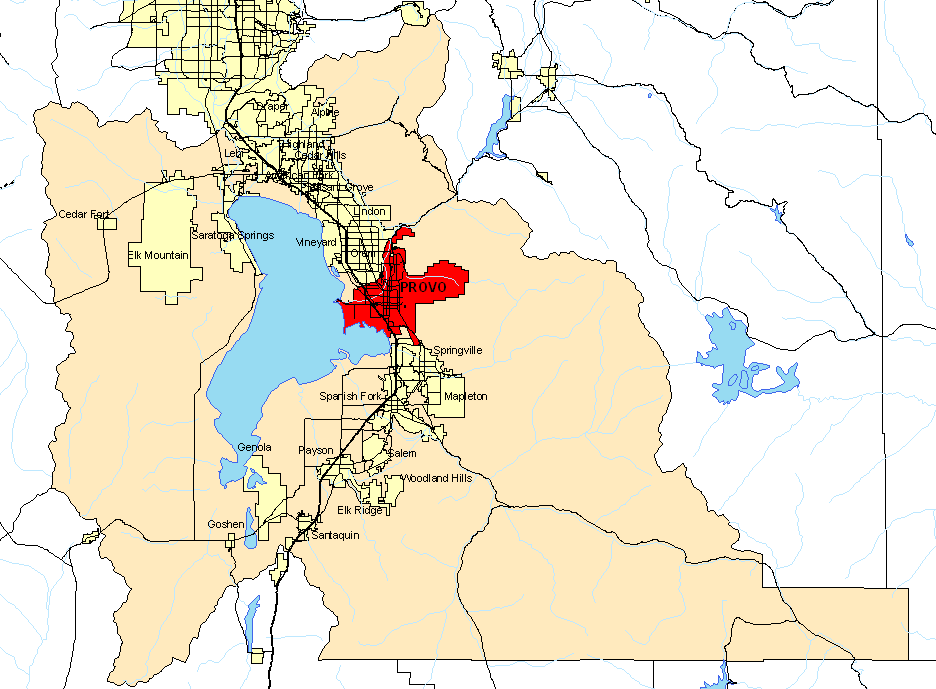
Map of Utah County

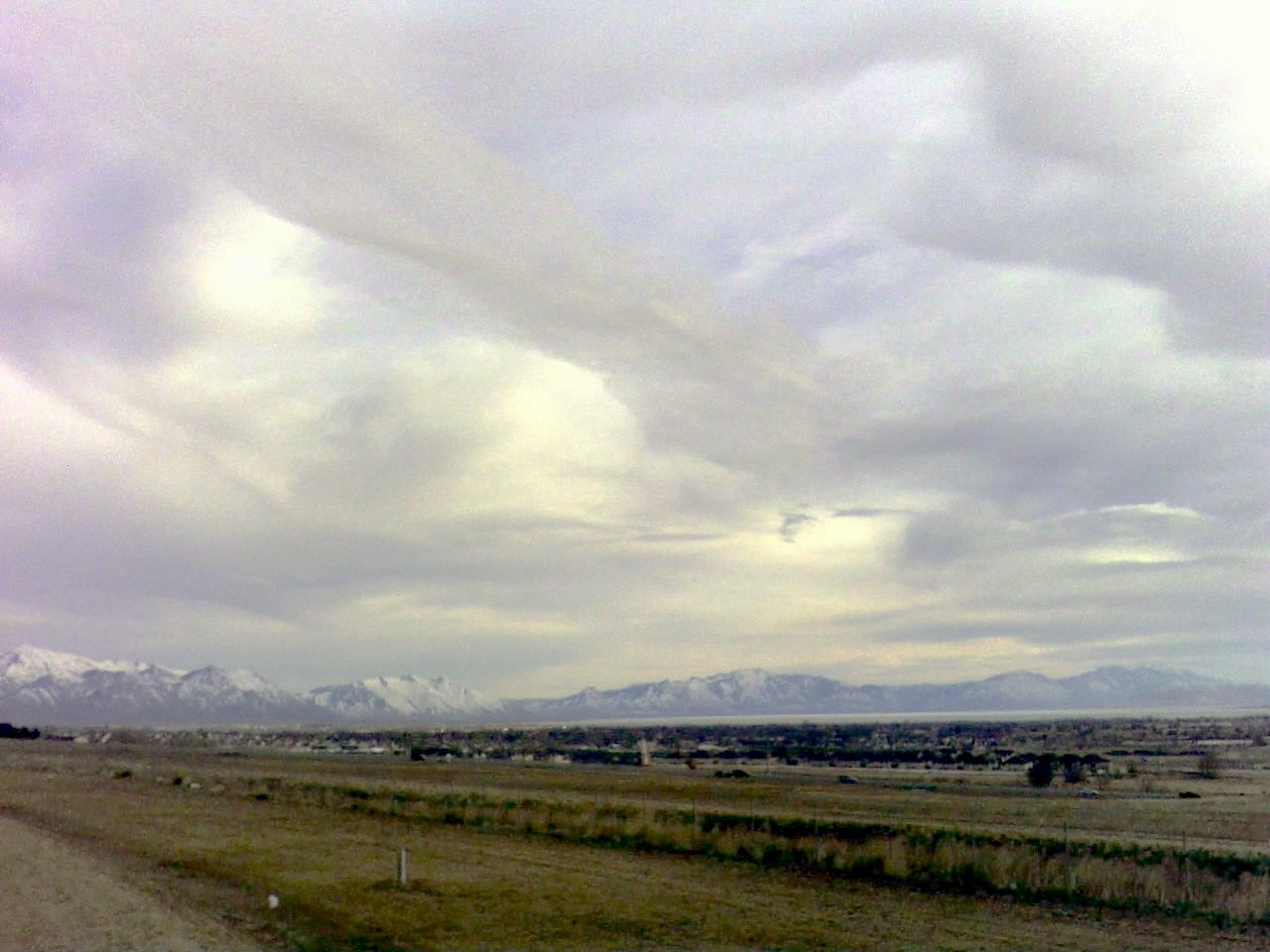
Utah Valley, Utah County as seen from Traverse Ridge in Lehi

=== Cities ===
- Alpine
- American Fork
- Bluffdale (part)
- Cedar Hills
- Draper (part)
- Eagle Mountain
- Elk Ridge
- Highland
- Lehi
- Lindon
- Mapleton
- Orem
- Payson
- Pleasant Grove
- Provo (county seat)
- Salem
- Santaquin (part)
- Saratoga Springs
- Spanish Fork
- Springville
- Vineyard
- Woodland Hills

=== Towns ===
- Cedar Fort
- Fairfield
- Genola
- Goshen
- Spring Lake

=== Census-designated places ===
- Benjamin
- Elberta
- Hobble Creek
- Lake Shore
- Palmyra
- Sundance
- West Mountain

=== Unincorporated communities ===
- Birdseye
- Colton
- Soldier Summit (part)
- Vivian Park

=== Former communities ===
- Caryhurst (now within Provo city limits)
- Christmas City (area is now partially in Provo and partially in Orem)
- Dividend
- Forest City
- Homansville
- Ironton (now within Provo city limits)
- Kyune
- Leland (mostly absorbed by Spanish Fork)
- Manila (former township, annexed by Pleasant Grove in 1998)
- Manning
- Mill Fork
- Mosida
- Thistle
- Tucker
- West Portal

== See also ==
- National Register of Historic Places listings in Utah County, Utah
