= Rocky Ridge, Utah =

Town in the state of Utah, United States

- Town
- Location of Rocky Ridge within Juab County and the state of Utah
- Coordinates: 39°55′30″N 111°49′35″W
- Country: United States
- State: Utah
- County: Juab
- Incorporated: January 1, 1998

Area
  - Total: 1.71 sq mi (4.44 km^{2})
  - Land: 1.71 sq mi (4.44 km^{2})
  - Water: 0 sq mi (0.00 km^{2})
- Elevation: 4,951 ft (1,509 m)

Population (2020)
  - Total: 848
  - Density: 500.7/sq mi (193.32/km^{2})
- Time zone: UTC-7 (Mountain (MST))
  - Summer (DST): UTC-6 (MDT)
- ZIP Code: 84645
- FIPS code: 49-64590
- GNIS feature ID: 2412568
- Website: www.rockyridgetown.com

Rocky Ridge is a town on the northeastern edge of Juab County, Utah, United States. As of the 2020 census it had a population of 848.

The town is located on the northern edge of the Juab Valley in the eastern foothills of the Wasatch Range, but entirely west of Interstate 15 (I‑15). It is part of the Provo–Orem, Utah Metropolitan Statistical Area.

While there is a "Rocky Ridge" and a "Rocky Ridge Canyon" in northeastern Juab County (both located east of the city of Nephi, approximately 16 miles [26 km] south‑southeast of the community), the town was named for "the rocks, in a bountiful array of types and colors, strewn plentifully across the surrounding ridges separating Juab and Utah counties," according to the town website.

== History ==
The original community in the area was known as York and was the southern terminus of the Utah Southern Railroad from February 1875 to May 1979. (The Utah Southern Railroad was controlled by the Union Pacific Railroad.) However, after the railroad was extended further south, the community of York was essentially abandoned. A post office had been established in the community in 1875, but it closed in 1879.

Nearly a century passed without much change, but by 1971 Marvin L. Allred had purchased 225 acres (91 ha) in the area and I‑15 had been completed to just north of the Juab‑Utah county line. Over the next quarter century the community (which had become known as locally as Allred Ranch) continued growing, with the completion of I‑15 through the valley and the addition of more than 950 acres (380 ha) to the community.

In May 1996, the Juab County Commissioners received a petition to incorporate the area under the name "Rocky Ridge". (A few years prior some residents of the area had petitioned unsuccessfully for incorporation under the name "York".) The later petition indicated that the population of the area had reached 210. By October of that year, the petition for incorporation was approved.

== Geography ==
Rocky Ridge is in the northeast corner of Juab County, at the northern end of the Juab Valley. It is bordered to the north by the city of Santaquin. Interstate 15 runs just east of the town limits, with access from the north at Exit 242 (Summit Ridge Parkway) in Santaquin. Payson is 11 miles (18 km) to the north, and Mona is 8 miles (13 km) to the south. Nephi, the Juab County seat, is 15 miles (24 km) south of Rocky Ridge.

According to the United States Census Bureau, the town has a total area of 2.1 square miles (5.5 km^{2}), all land.

== Demographics ==
Historical population
| Census | Pop. | Note | %± |
|---|---|---|---|
| 2000 | 403 | | — |
| 2010 | 733 | | 81.9% |
| 2020 | 848 | | 15.7% |
U.S. Decennial Census

As of the census of 2000, there were 403 people, 61 households, and 60 families residing in the town. The population density was 214.9 people per square mile (82.8/km^{2}). There were 73 housing units at an average density of 38.9 per square mile (15.0/km^{2}). The racial makeup of the town was 99.26% White, 0.25% from other races, and 0.50% from two or more races. Hispanic or Latino of any race were 1.24% of the population.

There were 61 households, out of which 85.2% had children under the age of 18 living with them, 47.5% were married couples living together, 49.2% had a female householder with no husband present, and 1.6% were non-families. No households were made up of individuals, and none had someone living alone who was 65 years of age or older. The average household size was 6.61 and the average family size was 6.53.

In the town, the population was spread out, with 59.6% under the age of 18, 16.4% from 18 to 24, 16.9% from 25 to 44, 6.0% from 45 to 64, and 1.2% who were 65 years of age or older. The median age was 14 years. For every 100 females, there were 91.9 males. For every 100 females age 18 and over, there were 77.2 males.

The median income for a household in the town was $31,944, and the median income for a family was $31,944. Males had a median income of $25,536 versus $25,179 for females. The per capita income for the town was $6,180. About 25.0% of families and 18.5% of the population were below the poverty line, including 27.2% of those under age 18 and none of those age 65 or over.

== Religion ==
The majority of the residents of Rocky Ridge are members of the Apostolic United Brethren.

== Education ==
The community is in the Juab School District.

== See also ==
- List of cities and towns in Utah
