= Goshen Valley =

Valley in Utah County, Utah, United States

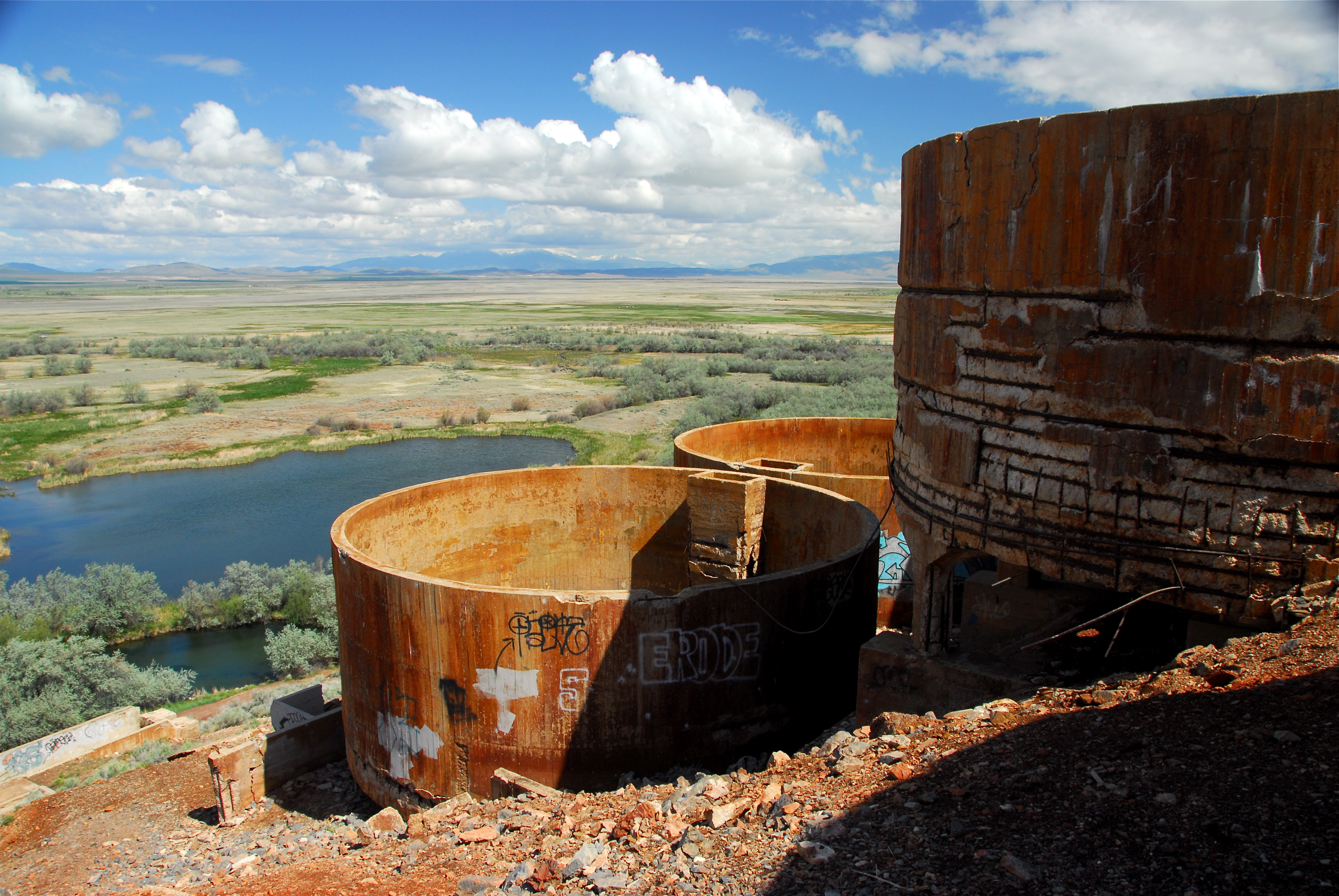
- View of northeast valley from Warm Springs Mountain

- Location within Utah
- Length: 17 mi (27 km) N-S (see text)
- Width: 11 mi (18 km)

Geography
- Country: United States
- State: Utah
- Regions: Great Basin Desert; Utah Valley
- County: Utah
- Communities: List: Goshen; Elberta; Laguna; Mosida (site); Genola; Santaquin
- Borders on: Utah Lake; West Mountain; Juab Valley; East Tintic Mountains
- Coordinates: 39°58′41″N 111°57′8″W
- River: Currant Creek
- Lake: Utah Lake
- Interactive map of Goshen Valley

The Goshen Valley is a 17-mile-long (27 km) valley located in southern Utah County, Utah, and the valley forms part of its southeast border with the Wasatch Front, and parts of the Wasatch Range. The valley is an extension southwesterly of the Utah Valley.

A southern arm (Goshen Bay), of Utah Lake of Utah Valley bisects the valley, with western shore valley areas extending north to Mosida (site), at the south of the Lake Mountains. The valley's northeast on the southeast Goshen Bay lakeshore is bounded by West Mountain, an off-lying mountain of the Wasatch Range. East of West Mountain is the southernmost part of Utah Valley's southeast, and, northwest, west & southwest of West Mountain is the Goshen Valley.

The southwest of Goshen Valley is bounded by the East Tintic Mountains where County Line Ridge, and other peaks, form the southwest boundary of Utah County. Mountains southeast turn northeast to meet the south of Utah Valley, east of West Mountain.

Goshen, Utah lies in the valley's center-southeast; Santaquin is adjacent northeast, and near the southern end of West Mountain.

== Description ==
The Goshen Valley is mostly a flat triangular shape, extending north–south; the point southward lies between the intersecting mountain foothills and ridgelines on both sides. Northwest is the southwest shore of Utah Lake, where the valley extends past a south arm of the lake (Goshen Bay), to reach Mosida, which lies at the south end of the Lake Mountains. Low foothills border the valley there northwest, and are mostly a mountain spur region (trending northeast) from the East Tintic Mountains, but connecting to the Lake Mountains.

The northeast of the valley ends at southwest West Mountain; there, the mountain forms a 9-mile-long (14 km) spur as the eastern border of Goshen Bay, the lake extension south into Goshen Valley. Also at the southwest of West Mountain are foothills, and a marshy region, as well as White Lake, only 0.5 mi from Utah Lake, separated by a strip of land.

Adjacent just south of West Mountain is another mountain, Warm Springs Mountain, 5,537 feet (1,688 m); its western flank is the site of the abandoned mining operation, the Tintic Standard Reduction Mill, and adjacent west is Warm Springs.

=== Currant Creek and reservoirs ===
Various creeks feed from the mountains located southwest and southeast. Currant Creek flows north towards Utah Lake in the valley center; the small Goshen Reservoir lies upstream (south) on Currant Creek in the center-south of the valley.

The Currant Creek Canal lies at the valley's south foothills, with a section for the southwest foothills, and for the southeast foothills. Each section is about 6 miles (9.7 km) long. Mona Reservoir lies beyond the southeast hills upstream, in the far north of Juab Valley. Currant Creek drains north through the north half of Juab Valley.

== See also ==
- List of valleys of Utah

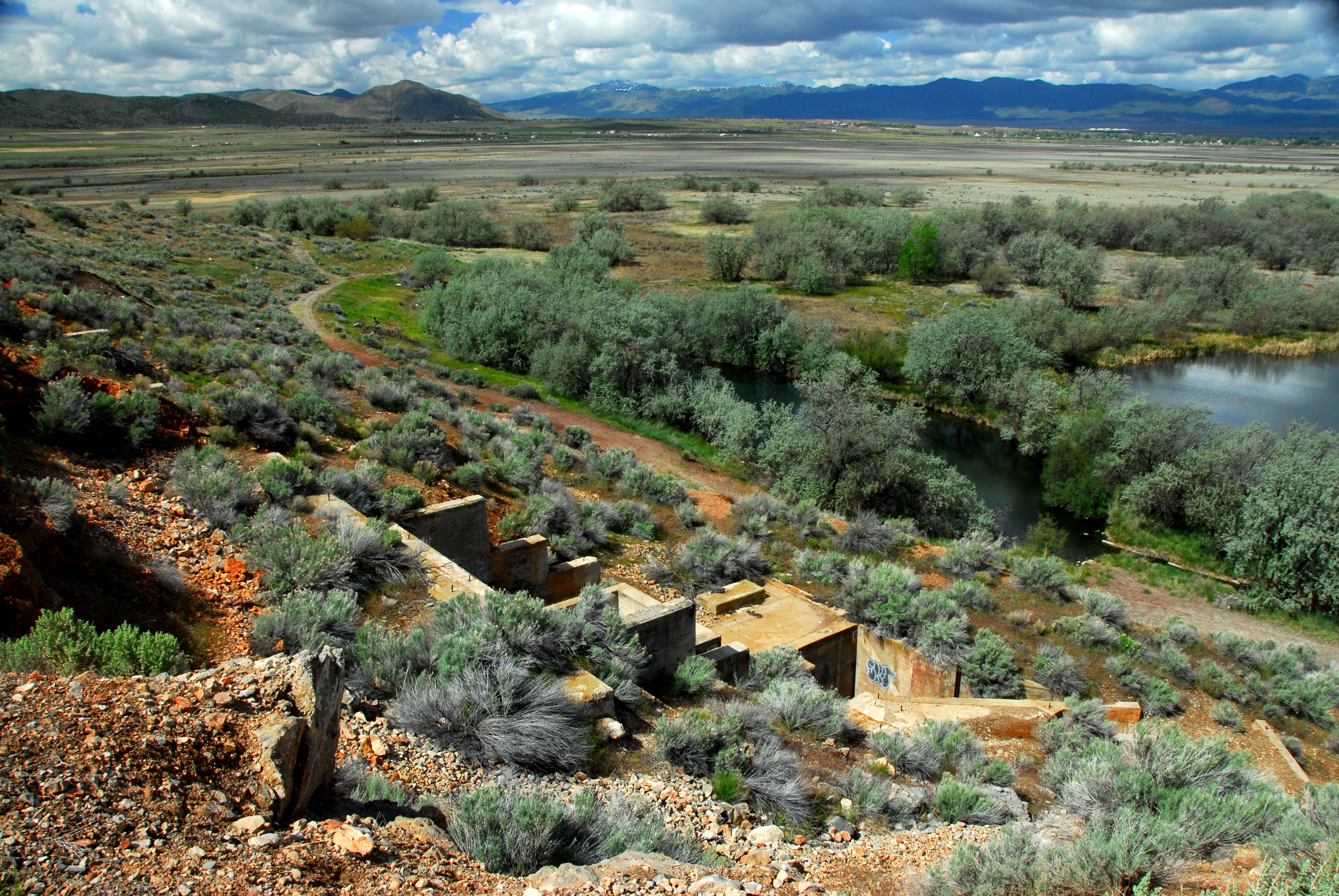
View southwest towards East Tintic Mountains from Warm Springs Mountain

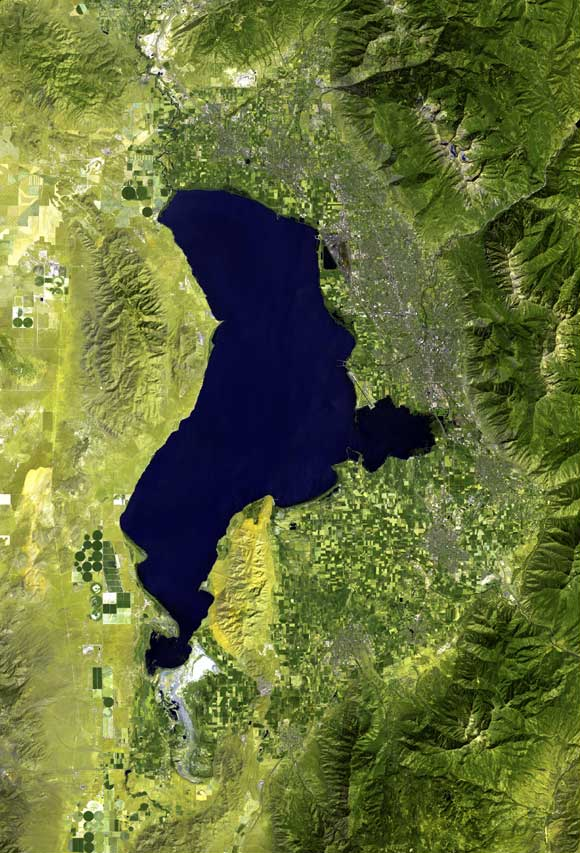
Satellite view of Goshen Valley, Utah Lake, and Utah Valley region
(Oquirrh Mountains-photo northwest)
