= Juab Valley =

Valley in Juab County, Utah, United States

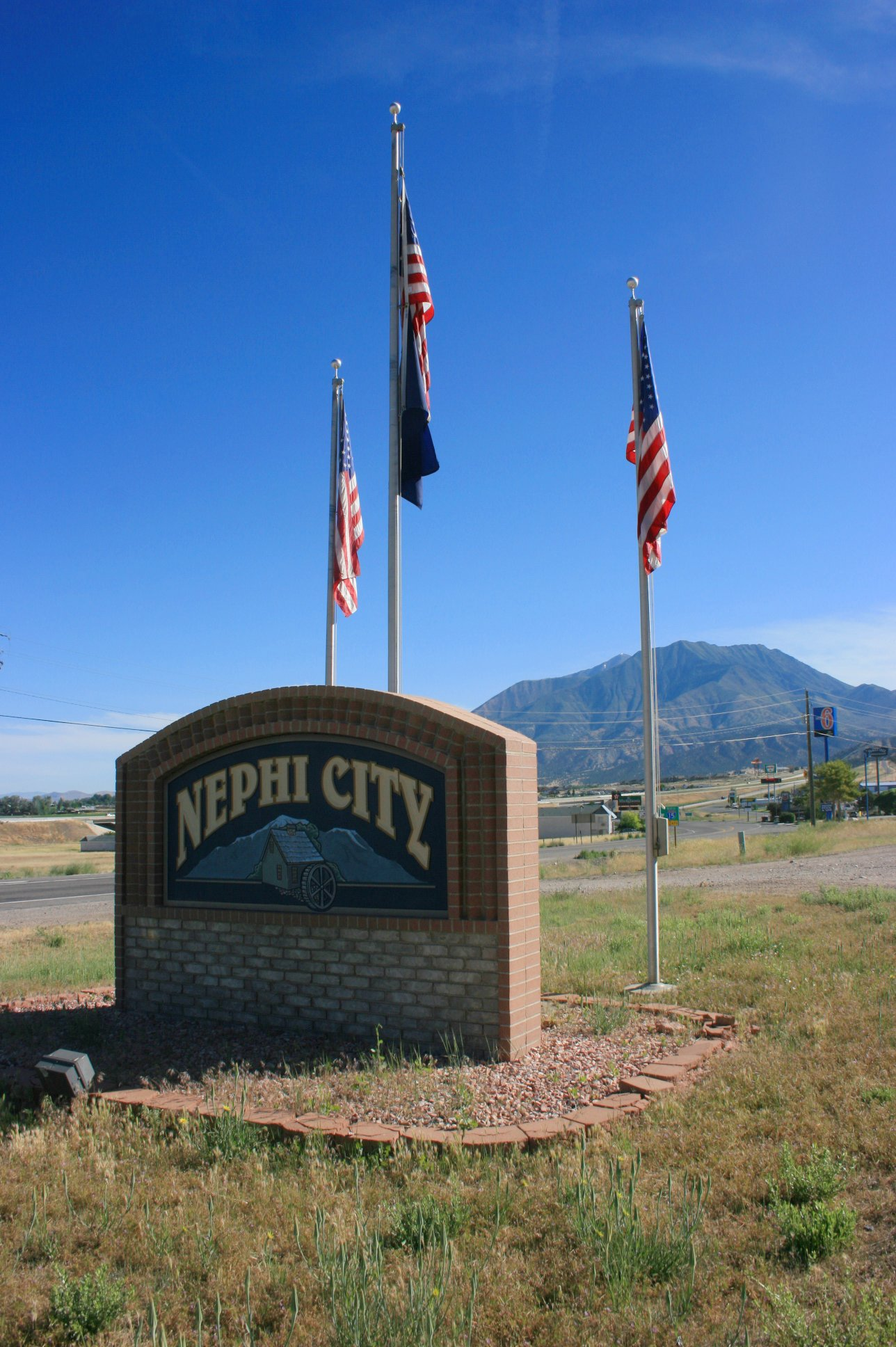
- Eastern Juab Valley in southern Nephi, with Mount Nebo in the distance, June 2007
- Length: 40 mi (64 km)
- Width: 6 mi (9.7 km)

Geography
- Location: Juab County, Utah
- Communities: List: Juab; Levan; Mona; Nephi; Rocky Ridge; Starr
- Borders on: East Tintic Mountains; -west (north valley) & northwest: Goshen Valley - north-northwest; Utah Valley - north; Wasatch Range; northeast & east (north valley); San Pitch Mountains; east (south valley); Valley Mountains - south; Sevier Bridge Reservoir; southwest; West Hills - west
- Coordinates: 39.5913°N 111.9623°W
- Rivers: List: Chicken; Currant; Chriss; Fourmile; Little Salt; Mednenhall; Mona; North; West; Willow
- Lakes: Sevier Bridge; Chicken Creek; Mona
- Interactive map of Juab Valley

The Juab Valley is a 40-mile (64 km) long valley located on the eastern edge of Juab County, Utah, United States.

== Description ==
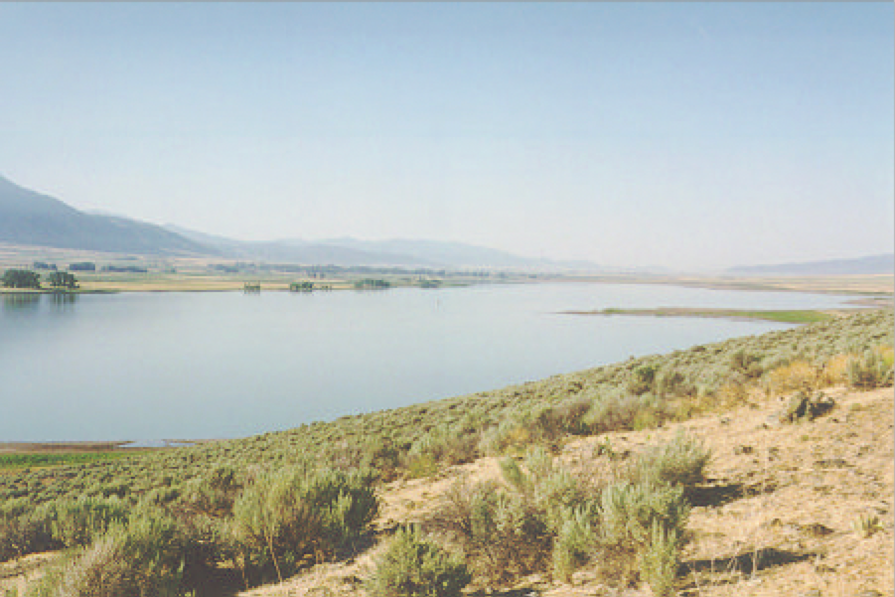
Looking south across the Mona Reservoir and Juab Valley, ca. 2000

The valley is in a region of dissected mountain ranges and valleys in the southern Wasatch Front, with the Wasatch Range on the northeast and the San Pitch Mountains on the southeast. The valley's north-northeast edge borders on the south of Utah Valley and another section of Utah Valley's southwest, the Goshen Valley. The eastern end of the northern border of Juab County is on the valley's north; the eastern end of the southern county is on the valley's southeast.

Juab Valley is linear, mostly north-south trending, with the major city-center of Nephi adjacent north of the valley center. The extreme north of the valley is adjacent to Santaquin which is located between the three valleys of southwest Utah Valley, east Goshen Valley, and north Juab Valley. The valley's extreme southwest borders a hilly region on the Sevier River's northeast riverbank-shoreline and Yuba State Park-(Sevier Bridge Reservoir), a stretch of the Sevier that flows north, then northwest to west.

The Juab Valley north-south center is south of Nephi, in the region of Sharp. Sage Valley Pass is located on the west in the West Hills that borders the east of a small mountain valley (Sage Valley).

The valley was named after the local Native Americans (Uabs, Yuabs, or Yoabs) of the Piute tribe.

== Creeks and reservoirs ==
The valley has an east-west water divide, just north of Levan. The streams south of the divide are part of the Sevier River Basin and the streams north of the divide flow north out of the valley toward Utah Lake and are part of the basin of the Great Salt Lake. (Both basins are part of the Great Basin, a large endorheic watershed in the Western United States.)

=== South valley ===
While the southern part of the valley is part of the Sevier River basin, no streams flow directly into the Sevier River within the Juab Valley. Instead, they flow southwest out of the valley before emptying into the Sevier River.

The Chicken Creek flows west out of the San Pitch Mountains (east of Levan). West of Levan it turns southwest then southerly into until it flows into the north end of the Chicken Creek Reservoir. The reservoir is located on the western edge of the valley, just north of the South Hills. The Chicken Creek flows out of the southwest corner of the reservoir and west out of the valley, by way of gap in the southern end of the West Hills.

Fourmile Creek flows northwest out of the San Pitch mountains, about 4.5 miles (7.2 km) north of Chicken Creek, but entirely dissipates prior to reaching the Interstate 15 (I-15) corridor. About 7 miles (11 km) south of Levan, Little Salt Creek flows west out of San Pitch Mountains and then northwest to the Chicken Creek Reservoir. The Chriss Creek also flows west out of the San Pitch Mountains, about 8.5 miles (13.7 km) south-southwest of Levan, and then flows southwest across and out of the valley, south of the South Hills, on its way to the Sevier River. (In addition, Gardners Fork, Pigeon Creek, and Deep Creek, all flow west out of the San Pitch Mountains, but dissipate upon [or prior to] reaching the valley floor.)

=== North valley ===
The northern part of Juab Valley has Current Creek, which rises on the valley floor (rather than the adjacent mountains) and then flows north into the Mona Reservoir. Just before reaching the reservoir and just west of the Burriston Ponds, the Currant Creek receives the West Creek (which flows northerly out of the West Hills). After leaving the west side of the Mona Reservoir, the Current Creek flows northwest out of the valley, through Goshen Canyon and on to Utah Lake. In addition, the Willow, Mona, North, and Mendenhall creeks all flow west out of the Wasatch Range, but dissipate shortly after reaching the valley floor.

== Populated places ==
The following communities are located within the Juab Valley:

- Juab (unincorporated community)
- Levan (town)
- Mona (city)
- Nephi (city)
- Rocky Ridge (town)
- Starr (unincorporated community)

== Transportation ==
=== Airports ===
The only airport in the valley is the Nephi Municipal Airport, which is located about 2.5 miles (4.0 km) northwest of the downtown area of Nephi. Being a general aviation municipal airport, no commercial passenger service is available.

=== Railroad ===
The Union Pacific Railroad (UP) operates a set of railroad tracks that run the length of the valley. The line enters the valley through a gap the West Hills (alongside Chicken Creek), just southwest of the Chicken Creek Reservoir. Running east of, but roughly parallel to I-15, they continue north to pass under the freeway at a point just southwest of Nephi. Continuing north, the tracks run west of, but again roughly parallel to, I-15. After passing by the western edges of both Nephi and Mona, the tracks leave the north end of the valley. There are no train stations or rail yards within the valley, but there are sidings in Juab, about 4 miles (6.4 km) north-northeast of Juab, and in Nephi. There are also two very short branch lines (spurs), one in Nephi (for UP) and the other about 7 miles (11 km) south-southwest of Nephi (for Intermountain Farmers Association's South Region Feed Mill).

=== Roads ===
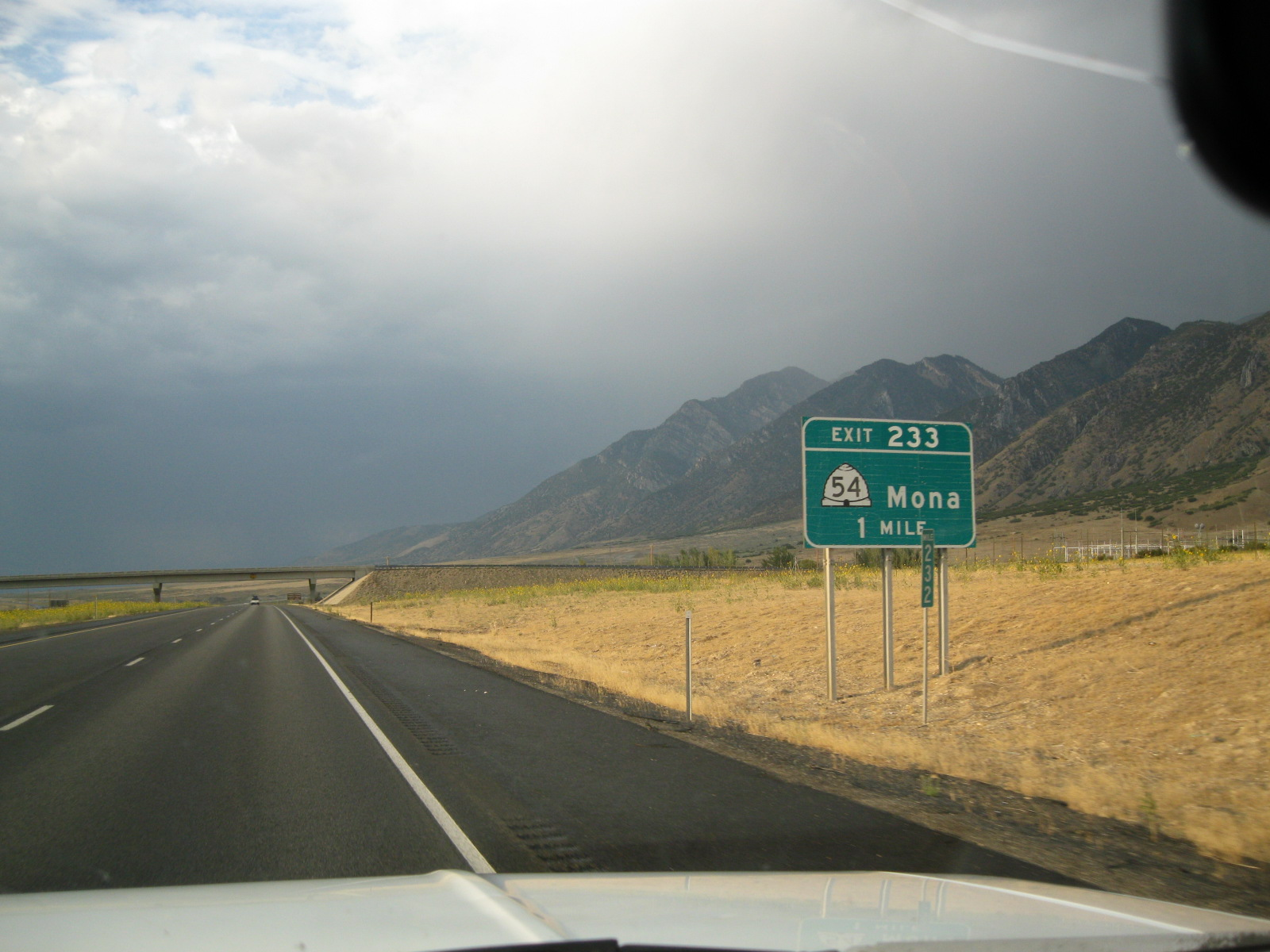
Northbound on Interstate 15 near Mona, August 2012

There is one Interstate Highway and four state highways in Juab Valley. Interstate 15 (I-15) enters the southwestern edge of the valley (just southwest of the Chicken Creek Reservoir) and runs north along the foothills on western edge of the valley. Just south of Nephi, the Interstate crosses over to the east side of the valley and continues north along the eastern foothills until it leaves the valley on its northern end.

Utah State Route 132 enters the valley from the West Hills and then runs easterly, through Nephi, before exiting the east side of the valley (between the Wasatch Range and the San Pitch Mountains). Utah State Route 28 enters the southern end of the valley and runs north, mostly along the eastern foothills, until it ends at an interchange with I-15, just north of Nephi. Utah State Route 78 begins at an interchange with I-15, immediately southwest of the Chicken Creek Reservoir, and then runs north-northeasterly and then east until it end ends at a junction with SR-28 in Levan. Utah State Route 54 begins at Main Street in Mona and runs easterly to end at interchange with I-15.

In addition to the Interstate and state highways, the former routing of U.S. Route 91 (known now as Old Highway 91) runs north from SR-28 (north of Nephi and just southwest of the I-15/SR-28 interchange) through Mona and exits the north end of valley, immediately west of I-15. The Goshen Canyon Road runs west from Mona, past the south end of the Mona Reservoir, and then north-northwest to leave the valley through Goshen Canyon.

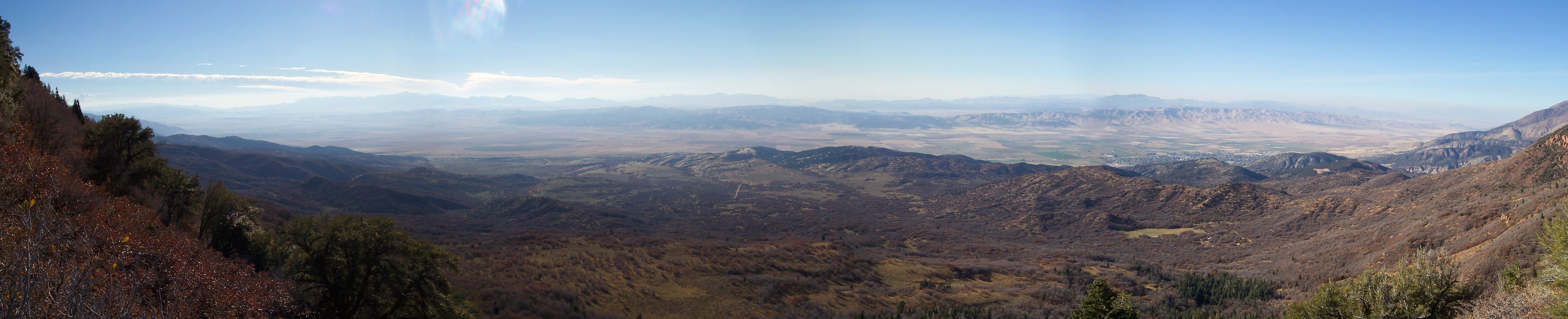
A panoramic view of Juab Valley, looking west from the San Pitch Mountains, southwest of Nephi

== See also ==
- List of valleys of Utah
- Landforms of the Great Basin
