= Currant Creek (Juab and Utah counties, Utah) =

- Location of the mouth of Currant Creek within the State of Utah Currant Creek (Juab and Utah counties, Utah) (the United States)

Location
- Country: United States
- State: Utah
- Counties: Juab, Utah
- City: Mona

Physical characteristics
- Source: Unnamed spring
  - location: Juab Valley
  - coordinates: 39°46′12.3″N 111°51′31.6″W (Note: In addition to the Current Creek that is the subject of this article, the Geographic Names Information System (GNIS) also lists a second Current Creek located within Juab County in the area of Mona. However, based upon the coordinates given for its source and mouth, it appears that this "other creek" is just a section of the creek which is the subject of this article, but flows in the opposite direction (north to south), which would mean it flows uphill. The given coordinates for this "other creek" indicate that its source is at a point along the Current Creek (the subject of this article) that is about 1 mile (1.6 km) southwest of the center of the city of Mona (coordinates 39°48′34″N 111°52′20″W) and that its mouth is at a point along the same Currant Creek (the subject of this article) that is south-southwest of Mona, about 3,400 feet (1,000 m) south of the Burriston Ponds, and about 1.64 miles (2.64 km) south-southeast of its source (coordinates 39°48′34″N 111°52′20″W).)
- Mouth: Utah Lake
  - location: Goshen Valley
  - coordinates: 39°59′01″N 111°55′39″W
  - elevation: 4,306 ft (1,312 m)
- Discharge
  - location: Goshen Valley

Basin features
- River system: Great Salt Lake
- Tributaries
  - left: West Creek, Kimball Creek
- GNIS feature ID: 1440201

Currant Creek is a stream in eastern Juab County and southern Utah County in northern Utah, United States.

== Description ==
The creek rises on the south end of a spring-fed marsh area in the northern part of Juab Valley, (Note: The coordinates for the source of Current Creek, the subject of this article, (39°46′39″N 111°51′42″W) listed in the Geographic Names Information System (GNIS) are about 2,835 feet (864 m) north-northwest of the actual location of the source of the creek (coordinates 39°46′12.3″N 111°51′31.6″W).) in eastern Juab County, about 1.85 miles (2.98 km) south‑southeast of the Burriston Ponds, 1 mile (1.6 km) west of Interstate 15, and about 4.4 miles (7.1 km) north‑northwest of the center of the city of Nephi, with an approximate elevation of 4,930 feet (1,500 m). From its source the creek runs north‑northwest though the marsh area. Within the marsh area, the creek flows through several unnamed ponds and joins with several other unnamed streams (with headwaters that are just east and west of the source of Currant Creek). Continuing north, it flows just west of and is fed by the Burriston Ponds. Just west of the ponds is Currant Creek's confluence with West Creek. Still further north it passes west of the city of Mona and, just before entering the Mona Reservoir (also known as Mount Nebo Reservoir), passes under Goshen Canyon Road (formerly State Route 214 (1941-1953).

On the northwest side of the Mona Reservoir (which is also fed by several unnamed streams) the creek passes through the dam (with a spillway elevation of 4,822 feet [1,470 m]) and then continues northwest through the Goshen Canyon. A short way down the canyon, the creek passes back under Goshen Canyon Road. Midway through the canyon the creek leaves Juab County and enters Utah County. The creek then continues flowing northwest from the canyon through the Goshen Valley until it reaches its confluence with Kimball Creek and then enters the Goshen Reservoir. Immediately north of the reservoir, the creek passes under U.S. Route 6. It then continues north from that highway until it reaches its mouth in a marsh area on the north side of the Goshen Valley at its confluence with the Goshen Bay of Utah Lake, at an elevation of 4,491 feet (1,369 m).

== Tributaries ==
In addition to numerous unnamed springs and streams that contribute to Currant Creek, there are two named tributaries.

West Creek

Location
- County: Juab County

Physical characteristics
- Source: Orme Spring
  - location: West Hills range
  - coordinates: 39°38′06″N 111°52′43″W
- Mouth: Currant Creek
  - location: Juab Valley
  - coordinates: 39°38′06″N 111°52′43″W
  - elevation: 4,828 feet (1,472 m)

Basin features
- GNIS feature ID: 1434062

=== West Creek ===
West Creek, the first named tributary of Currant Creek, is a stream located in eastern Juab County. The source of the creek is the Orme Spring, located in the middle of the West Hills range at the top of Spring Canyon at an elevation of about 5,760 feet (1,760 m). From the spring, the creek flows north‑northeast down to an elevation of 5,289 feet (1,612 m) at the mouth of the canyon. (Note: Rather than Orme Spring, the United States Geological Survey (USGS) topographical map (as shown on mytopo.com) indicates that source of West Creek is on the Juab Valley floor, just north of Interstate 15. This disagrees with the source coordinates listed in USGS's Geographic Names Information System, as well as other maps.) After entering the Juab Valley, the creek continues its northerly course along the west side of the valley to pass under State Route 132. It then resumes a north‑northeast course until it empties into the Currant Creek, immediately west of the Burriston Ponds, at an elevation of 4,928 feet (1,502 m).

Orme Spring
- Interactive map of Orme Spring
- Location: Spring Canyon, West Hills range
- Coordinates: 39°38′06″N 111°52′43″W
- Type: Seep

==== Orme Spring ====
Orme Spring, is spring in eastern Juab County. The seepage spring is located near the head of Spring Canyon in the West Hills, at an elevation of about 5,760 feet (1,760 m), and is the source of West Creek.

Kimball Creek

Location
- County: Utah County

Physical characteristics
- Source
  - location: East Tintic Mountains
  - coordinates: 39°48′25″N 112°04′09″W
- Mouth: Currant Creek
  - location: Goshen Valley
  - coordinates: 39°38′06″N 111°52′43″W

Basin features
- GNIS feature ID: 1429347

=== Kimball Creek ===
Kimball Creek, the other named tributary of Currant Creek, is an intermittent stream and is located in southern Utah County. The creek rises on the east face of the south side of Tintic Mountain at the top of Big Dog Canyon within the East Tintic Mountains range, at an elevation of approximately 7,250 feet (2,210 m) and just east of the Juab‑Utah county line. From is source, the creek and the canyon run southerly to a point about 1.8 miles (2.9 km) south‑southeast of the source and about 2,000 feet (610 m) north of the Juab‑Utah county line. The creek and the canyon then head northeast to the mouth of the canyon on the southwest end of the Goshen Valley. After entering the valley, the creek continues on its northeasterly course until it reaches its mouth on the Current Creek, about 3,250 feet (990 m) south of the Goshen Reservoir, at an elevation of 4,587 feet (1,398 m).

== See also ==
- List of rivers of Utah
