= Santaquin Junior High School =

- U.S. National Register of Historic Places
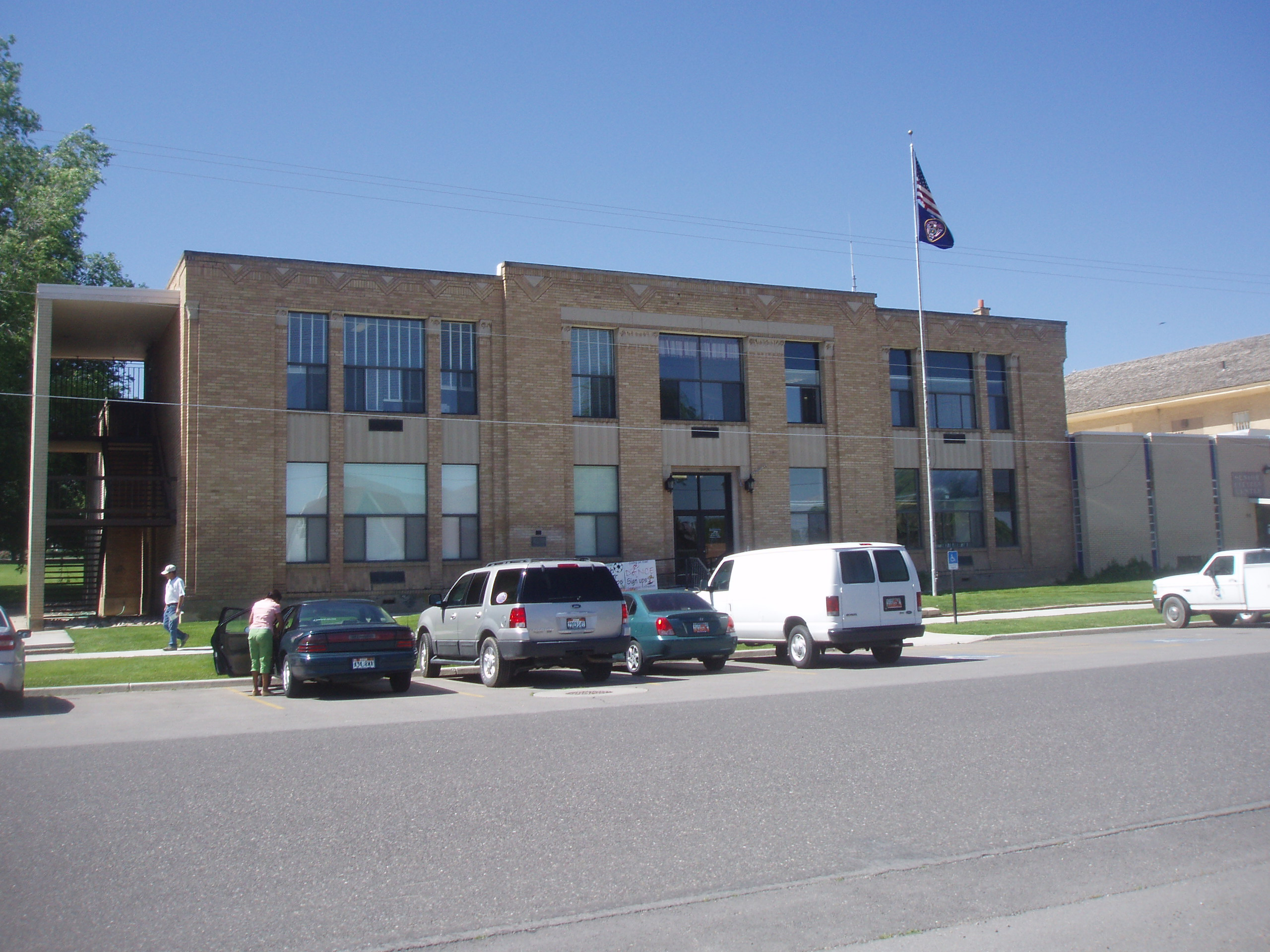

- Location within Utah Location within the United States
- Location: 75 W. 100 South, Santaquin, Utah
- Coordinates: 39°58′26″N 111°46′26″W
- Area: less than one acre
- Built: 1935
- Architectural style: PWA Moderne
- MPS: Public Works Buildings TR
- NRHP reference No.: 85000817
- Added to NRHP: April 1, 1985

The Santaquin Junior High School, located in Santaquin, Utah, United States, was built in 1935 as a Public Works Administration (PWA) project. It was listed on the National Register of Historic Places in 1985.

It is a two-story brick school. Additions during c.1950–60, while not compatible with its PWA Moderne original section, are on the side and rear and do not detract greatly from the architectural appearance.
