= Utah State Route 54 =

State highway in Utah, United States

State Route 54
- 200 North

Route information
- Maintained by UDOT
- Length: 1.344 mi (2.163 km)
- Existed: 1971–present

Major junctions
- West end: Main Street in Mona
- East end: I-15 in Mona

Location
- Country: United States
- State: Utah

Highway system
- Utah State Highway System; Interstate; US; State; Minor; Scenic
← SR-53	→ SR-55

State Route 54 is a short highway completely within the town of Mona in Juab County in northern Utah that connects Main Street (old US-91) to I-15 in a span of one mile (1.6 km).

== Route description ==
From its western terminus, the highway veers to the northeast and steadies out to the east. It continues this direction before it ends at a cattle guard just east of its junction with I-15.

== History ==
In 1971, the State Road Commission designated a new State Route 54, connecting proposed I-15 at exit 233 with Mona. In 1975, after I-15 was completed, old US-91 through Mona (then designated SR-41) was given back to the town and Juab County.

== Major intersections ==
The entire route is in Mona, Juab County.

mi	km	Destinations	Notes
0.000	0.000	Main Street	Western terminus Old US-91
1.186– 1.210	1.909– 1.947	I-15 – Nephi, Provo	
1.344	2.163	Cattle guard	Eastern terminus
1.000 mi = 1.609 km; 1.000 km = 0.621 mi
