= Juab High School =

Location
- 802 North 650 East; Nephi, Utah 84648; United States; 39°43′14″N 111°49′22″W

Information
- Type: Public
- Established: 1894 (Nephi High School, later changed to Juab High School)
- School district: Juab School District
- Principal: Todd Quarnberg
- Teaching staff: 35.00 (on FTE basis)
- Grades: 9 to 12
- Enrollment: 897 (2024-2025)
- Student to teacher ratio: 25.63
- Colors: Crimson and gold
- Slogan: Go The Wasp Way
- Sports: Football Basketball Volleyball Softball Baseball
- Mascot: Wasp
- Nickname: The Wasps
- Publication: The Clarion The Nebonian
- Newspaper: The Clarion
- Yearbook: The Nebonian
- Website: https://www.juabsd.org/o/jhs

Juab High School is a 3A public high school located in Nephi, Utah, at the base of Mount Nebo. Juab High School is included in the Canopy Project.

The school serves about 860 students grades 9 to 12 in the Juab School District. It is the only high school in the Juab School District. The current school building was built in 1999.

Juab High School has two major publications.

Chief of these is The Clarion, the student newspaper that comes out twice annually.

A second publication, the Nebonian, is the yearbook that is produced each year.

== Notable alumni ==
- Brandon Flowers, lead singer of band The Killers; attended for grades 9-11
