= Currant Creek =

Currant Creek may refer to:

- Currant Creek (Juab and Utah counties, Utah)
- A creek in Currant, Nevada
- Currant Creek Dam (Utah), including the river Currant Creek and the Currant Creek Reservoir in Wasatch County
- Currant Creek Pass, a mountain pass in the Front Range of Colorado
