= Provo–Orem–Lehi metropolitan area =

Metropolitan region in Utah, United States

Provo–Orem–Lehi, UT Metropolitan Statistical Area
- Metropolitan Statistical Area
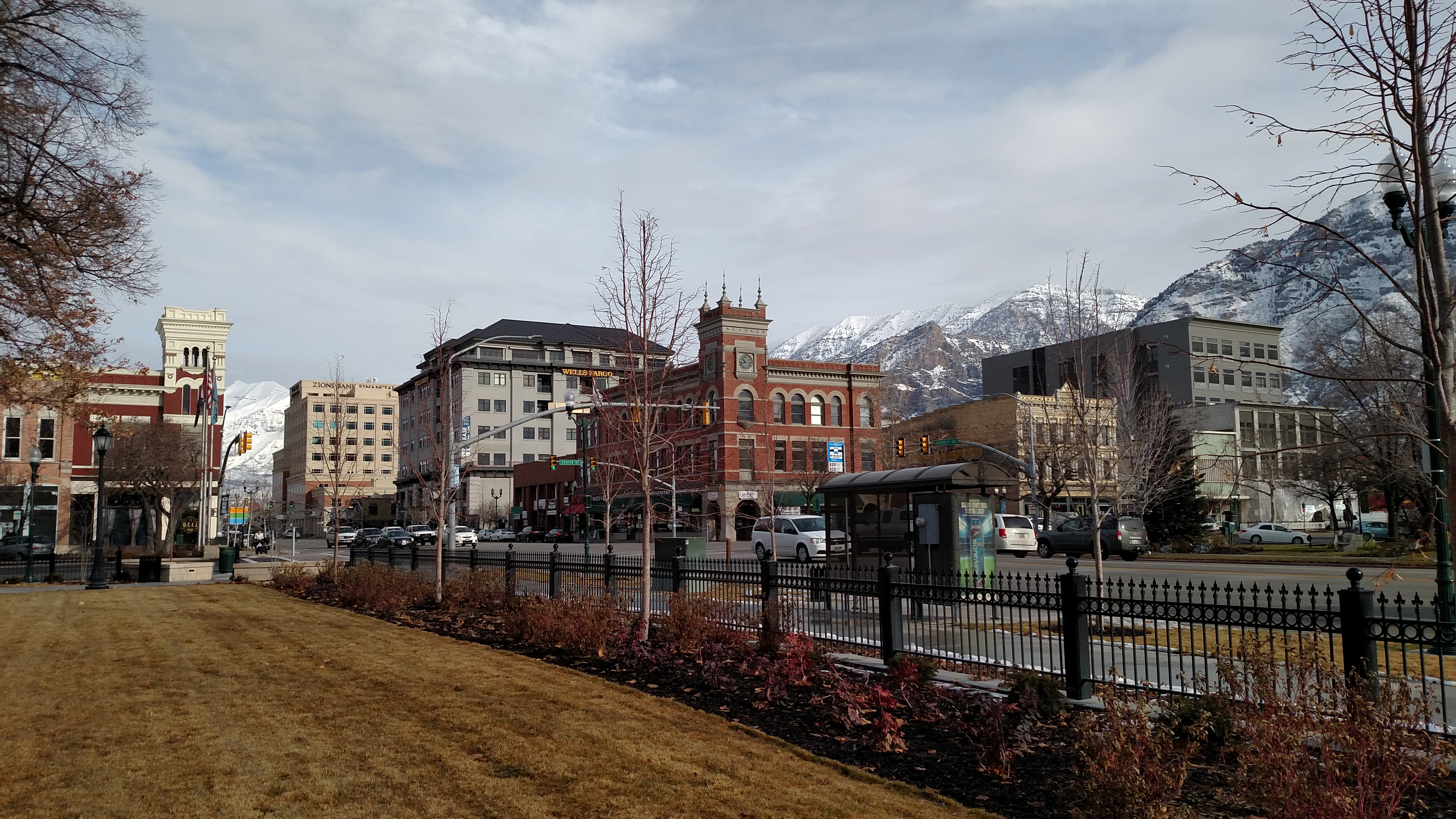
- Downtown Provo in January 2016
Map of Salt Lake City–Provo–Orem, UT–ID CSA
Salt Lake City–Murray, UT MSA
Provo–Orem–Lehi, UT MSA
Ogden, UT MSA
Heber, UT μSA
Brigham City, UT-ID μSA
- Country: United States
- State: Utah
- Largest city: Provo
- Other principal cities: - Lehi; - Orem

Area
  - Total: 5,395.8 sq mi (13,975 km^{2})

Population (2020 census)
  - Total: 671,172
  - Estimate (2026): 804,843 ▲
  - Density: 124.4/sq mi (48.0/km^{2})

GDP
  - Total: $40.761 billion (2022)
- Time zone: UTC−7 (MST)
  - Summer (DST): UTC−6 (MDT)

The Provo–Orem–Lehi, UT Metropolitan Statistical Area, as defined by the United States Office of Management and Budget, is a metropolitan statistical area (MSA) consisting of two counties in Utah, anchored by the cities of Provo, Orem, and Lehi. As of the 2020 census, the MSA had a population of 671,185. The MSA is a component of the Salt Lake City–Provo–Orem, UT-ID Combined Statistical Area.

== Counties ==
- Juab
- Utah

== Communities ==
- Alpine
- American Fork
- Benjamin (CDP)
- Birdseye (unincorporated)
- Bluffdale (partial)
- Callao (unincorporated)
- Cedar Fort
- Cedar Hills
- Draper (partial)
- Eagle Mountain
- Elberta (CDP)
- Elk Ridge
- Eureka
- Fairfield
- Genola
- Goshen
- Highland
- Juab (unincorporated)
- Lake Shore (CDP)
- Lehi (Principal city)
- Leland (unincorporated)
- Levan
- Lindon
- Mapleton
- Mills (unincorporated)
- Mona
- Nephi (county seat of Juab)
- Orem (Principal city)
- Palmyra (CDP)
- Partoun (unincorporated)
- Payson
- Pleasant Grove
- Provo (Principal city-Utah county seat)
- Rocky Ridge
- Salem
- Santaquin
- Saratoga Springs
- Spanish Fork
- Spring Lake (CDP)
- Springdell (unincorporated)
- Springville
- Trout Creek (unincorporated)
- Vineyard
- Vivian Park (unincorporated)
- West Mountain (CDP)
- Woodland Hills
- Former town site of Thistle

== Demographics ==
Historical population
| Census | Pop. | Note | %± |
|---|---|---|---|
| 2000 | 376,774 | | — |
| 2010 | 526,810 | | 39.8% |
| 2020 | 671,185 | | 27.4% |

As of the census of 2010, there were 526,810 people, 143,695 households, and 116,844 families residing within the MSA. The racial makeup of the MSA was 89.5% White, 0.5% African American, 0.6% Native American, 1.3% Asian, 0.7% Pacific Islander, 4.6% from other races, and 2.7% from two or more races. Hispanic or Latino of any race were 10.7% of the population.

As of the census of 2000, median income for a household in the MSA was $41,986, and the median income for a family was $46,426. Males had a median income of $35,750 versus $22,025 for females. The per capita income for the MSA was $14,174.

A survey of about 190 metropolitan areas found 77% of Provo–Orem–Lehi residents are classified as "very religious," the largest percentage in the United States.

| County | Seat | 2025 estimate | 2020 Census | Change | Area | Density |
|---|---|---|---|---|---|---|
| Utah | Provo | 759,859 | 659,399 | +15.24% | 2,144 sq mi (5,550 km^{2}) | 354/sq mi (137/km^{2}) |
| Juab | Nephi | 13,567 | 11,786 | +15.11% | 3,406 sq mi (8,820 km^{2}) | 4/sq mi (2/km^{2}) |
| Total | | 773,426 | 671,185 | +15.23% | 5,550 sq mi (14,400 km^{2}) | 139/sq mi (54/km^{2}) |

== See also ==
- Utah census statistical areas
- Wasatch Front
