= Juab School District =

Public school district in Juab County, Utah, United States

Address
- 346 East 600 North Nephi, Utah, 84648; United States

District information
- Type: Public
- Grades: K - 12
- Superintendent: Rick Robins
- Governing agency: Utah Department of Education
- Schools: 3 elementary schools; 1 junior high school; 1 high schools
- NCES District ID: 4900450

Students and staff
- Students: 2,283
- Teachers: 104

Other information
- Website: www.juabsd.org

Juab School District is a school district located in eastern Juab County, Utah, United States. It serves the far eastern part of Juab County (Juab Valley, the portion of the county along the Interstate 15 corridor), while the Tintic School District serves the remaining portion of Juab County (west to the Nevada border). The district is the eleventh smallest of the 41 school districts within the state Juab School District is part of the Digital Promise League of Innovative Schools and winner of the Digital School Districts Survey 2017-2018.

== Communities served ==
The Juab School District serves the following communities:

- Levan
- Mills
- Mona
- Nephi
- Rocky Ridge

== Schools ==
The following are schools within the Juab School District:

=== Elementary schools ===
- Mona Elementary School - Mona
- Nebo View Elementary School - Nephi
- Red Cliffs Elementary School - Nephi

=== Junior high schools ===
- Juab Junior High School - Nephi

=== High schools ===
- Juab High School - Nephi

== See also ==
- List of school districts in Utah
- Tintic School District
