= Mona Reservoir =

Reservoir in the state of Utah, United States

- Location within Utah Location within the United States
- Location: Juab County, Utah
- Coordinates: 39°49′15″N 111°52′04″W
- Type: reservoir
- Primary inflows: Currant Creek
- Primary outflows: Currant Creek
- Basin countries: United States
- Surface elevation: 4,882 ft (1,488 m)

Mona Reservoir is a large reservoir on Currant Creek in the north end of Juab Valley, Juab County, Utah. It was created in 1895 by the construction of an earthen dam.

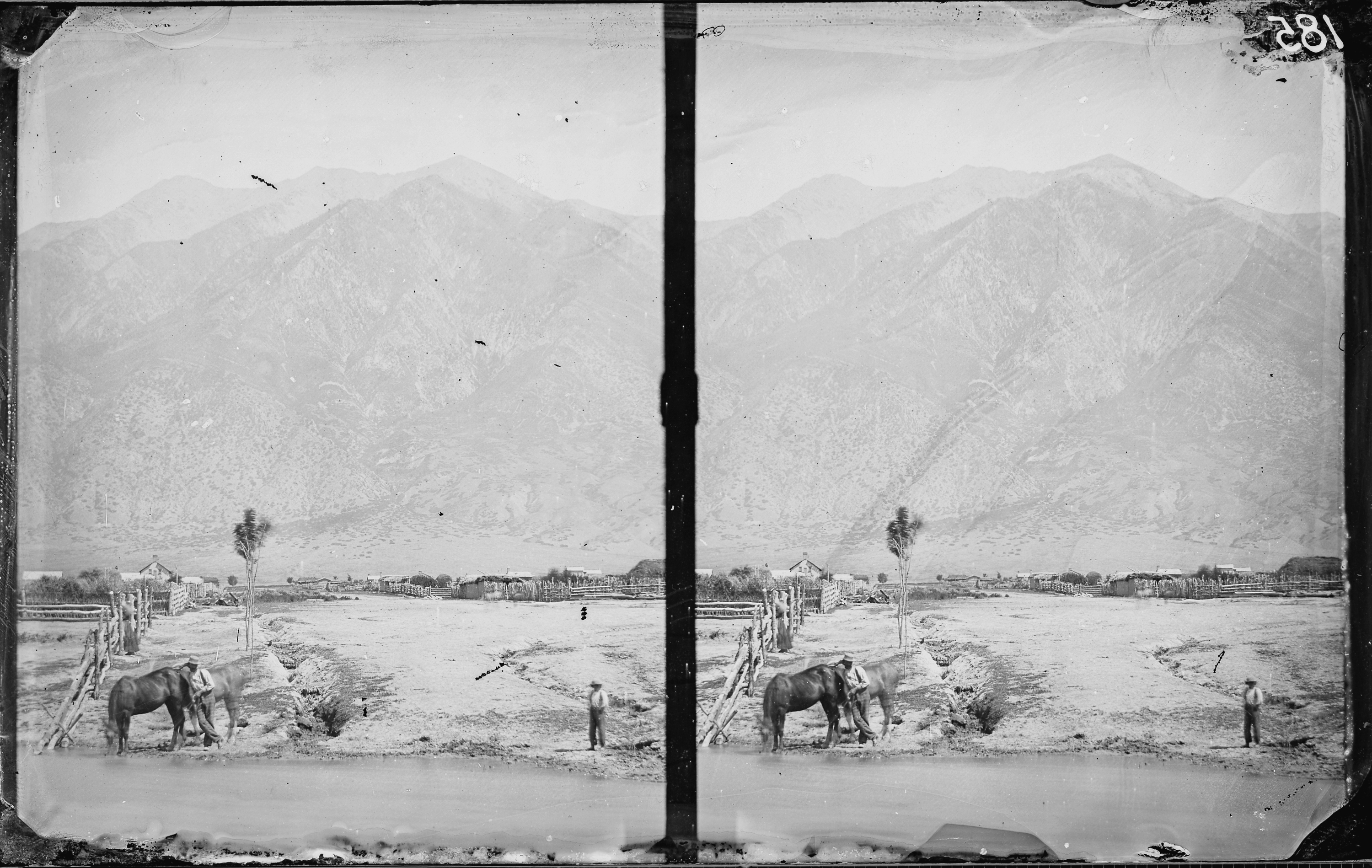
Currant Creek region south of Mona Reservioir inlet, at Mona, Utah; (1872, view east to Mount Nebo (Utah)
