= Irene Colvin Corbett =

Mormon teacher and musician

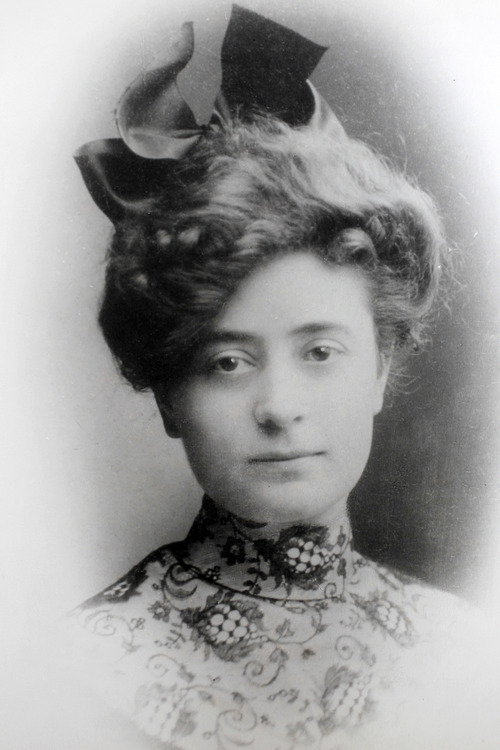
- Irene as a young woman in the 1890s
- Born: Irene Colvin; August 6, 1881; Payson, Utah
- Died: April 15, 1912 (aged 30); Atlantic Ocean
- Occupations: Musician, teacher
- Spouse: Walter Harris Corbett (1883–1917)
- Children: Walter Colvin (b. 16 December 1906), Kady Roene (b. 5 November 1908) and Mack Colvin (b. 27 December 1910)
- Parents: Levi Alexander Colvin (1857–1928) (father); Mary Alice Curtis (1858–1940) (mother)

Irene Colvin Corbett (August 6, 1881 - April 15, 1912) was a musician, teacher and nurse from Payson, Utah and the only Mormon to die during the Sinking of the Titanic.

== Ancestry ==
Irene's paternal family came to America around 1677 when Irene's 5th great-grandfather John Colvin moved to the Massachusetts Bay Colony from Glasgow, Scotland. Irene's maternal family moved to America around 1635 when Irene's 6th great-grandfather Zacheus Curtis moved to Salem, Massachusetts from Wiltshire, England.

== Life ==
Irene was born to Levi Alexander Colvin (1857–1928) and Mary Alice Curtis (1858–1940), Levi was a Mormon bishop and county official who married Mary in 1880. Irene graduated from Provo Academy with a teaching certificate and taught at Peteetneet Academy, then an elementary school. She stopped teaching upon her marriage to Walter Corbett on 11 December 1905.

Irene and Walter had three children: Walter Colvin (b. 16 December 1906), Kady Roene (b. 5 November 1908) and Mack Colvin (b. 27 December 1910). According to the 1910 census, Irene and her family were living in Pleasant View, Utah. In the winter of 1911, Irene traveled to London, England to study midwifery despite Walter's wishes.

== RMS Titanic ==
Irene traveled to Southampton and boarded the RMS Titanic on April 10, 1912, to return to Utah; Irene was one of 14 second class women to die during the sinking. Irene's father, unaware of her death sent a telegram to White Star Line asking about his daughter to which they responded with the following two messages:

"New York, April 19, Levi Colvin, Provo, Utah. Neither the name of Mrs Irene Corbett nor anything like it appears on the Titanic's second cabin list of passengers as having sailed from Southampton. WHITE STAR LINE."

"New York, April 19, Levi Colvin, Provo, Utah. Now find name of Mrs Irene C. Corbett is on the list of passengers having sailed from Southampton, but regret is not a survivor on Carpathia. WHITE STAR LINE."

Walter remarried in 1914 but died on February 4, 1917, after a mining accident. Custody of their children was granted to Levi and Mary Colvin.
