= Mount Nebo (Utah) =

Mountain in Utah, United States

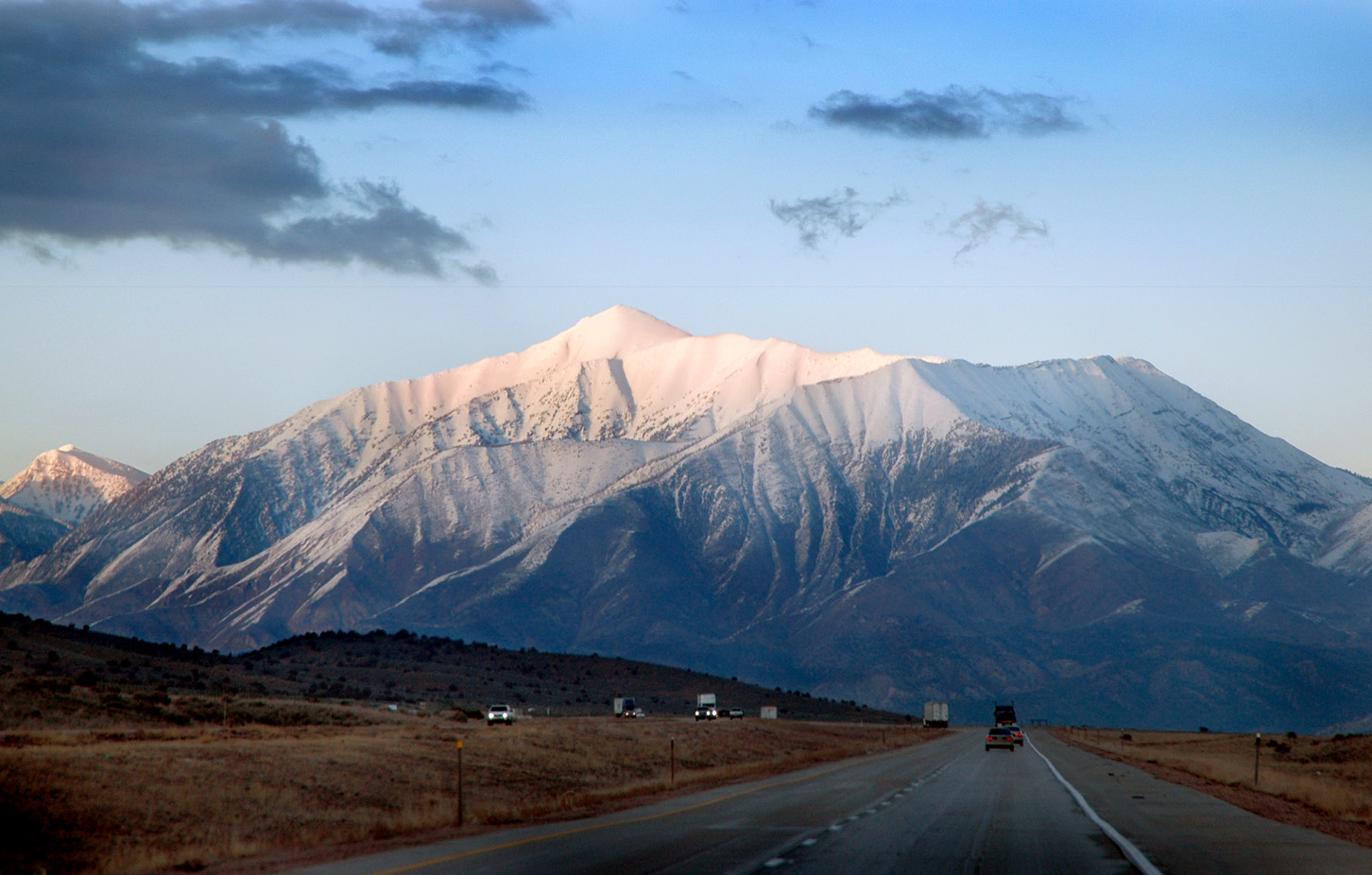
- Mount Nebo, February 2005

Highest point
- Elevation: 11,933 ft (3,637 m) NAVD 88
- Prominence: 5,488 ft (1,673 m)
- Isolation: 75.57 mi (121.62 km)
- Listing: US most prominent peaks 91st; US most isolated peaks 87th; Utah high points 10th
- Coordinates: 39°49′18″N 111°45′36″W

Geography
- Location within Utah
- Location: Juab / Utah counties, Utah, U.S.
- Parent range: Wasatch Range
- Topo map: USGS Mona

Climbing
- First ascent: 1869
- Easiest route: Hike

Mount Nebo is the southernmost and highest mountain in the Wasatch Range of Utah, in the United States, and the centerpiece of the Mount Nebo Wilderness, inside the Uinta National Forest. It is named after the biblical Mount Nebo in Jordan.

Mount Nebo has two summits: the northern summit reaches 11,933 feet (3,637 m), and the southern summit reaches 11,882 feet (3,622 m). Early surveys placed the southern peak as the highest, but the mountain was resurveyed in the 1970s and the northern peak was found to be higher. It is the highest point of Utah County.

Mount Nebo is classified as one of 128 ultra-prominent peaks in the United States, or mountains having more than 1,500 metres (4,900 ft) of topographic prominence. The mountain is typically partially or completely covered in snow from mid-October until July. Nearby towns include Mona (closest), Payson, Nephi, and Provo.

A substantial trail leads to the south summit, accessible from starting points on the east or west of the mountain. Another trail accesses the north summit, starting northeast of the mountain. A "bench trail" runs along the mountain's east side from north to south at roughly 9,000 feet elevation. Although strenuous, all of these trails are popular with hikers; many are dangerous places for horseback riders. One old-time local rider warns: "There's dead horses in every canyon on that mountain!"

The Mount Nebo Scenic Byway is a federally designated National Scenic Byway which departs I-15 at Payson and travels south through the Mount Nebo Wilderness, climbing to over 9,000 feet before rejoining the interstate at Nephi. The route features panoramic views of Mount Nebo, the Utah Valley, and Utah Lake far below. There are numerous trailheads along the route for the hiking enthusiast, including a short walk to the "Devil's Kitchen", an area that has been described as a "mini Bryce Canyon".

== Climate ==
There is no weather station at the summit, but this climate table contains interpolated data for an area around the summit. Mount Nebo has a subalpine climate (Köppen Dfc).

Climate data for Mount Nebo 39.8098 N, 111.7651 W, Elevation: 11,371 ft (3,466 m) (1991–2020 normals)
Month	Jan	Feb	Mar	Apr	May	Jun	Jul	Aug	Sep	Oct	Nov	Dec	Year
Mean daily maximum °F (°C)	26.8 (−2.9)	26.3 (−3.2)	31.0 (−0.6)	36.1 (2.3)	45.8 (7.7)	58.2 (14.6)	66.7 (19.3)	64.9 (18.3)	56.6 (13.7)	44.1 (6.7)	32.9 (0.5)	26.4 (−3.1)	43.0 (6.1)
Daily mean °F (°C)	17.2 (−8.2)	16.1 (−8.8)	20.3 (−6.5)	24.8 (−4.0)	34.0 (1.1)	45.3 (7.4)	53.5 (11.9)	51.9 (11.1)	43.9 (6.6)	32.9 (0.5)	23.3 (−4.8)	17.0 (−8.3)	31.7 (−0.2)
Mean daily minimum °F (°C)	7.7 (−13.5)	5.8 (−14.6)	9.5 (−12.5)	13.5 (−10.3)	22.3 (−5.4)	32.5 (0.3)	40.2 (4.6)	38.8 (3.8)	31.3 (−0.4)	21.7 (−5.7)	13.6 (−10.2)	7.6 (−13.6)	20.4 (−6.5)
Average precipitation inches (mm)	3.66 (93)	3.19 (81)	3.28 (83)	3.53 (90)	2.80 (71)	1.56 (40)	1.47 (37)	2.00 (51)	2.25 (57)	2.60 (66)	3.18 (81)	4.11 (104)	33.63 (854)
Source: PRISM Climate Group

== Gallery ==
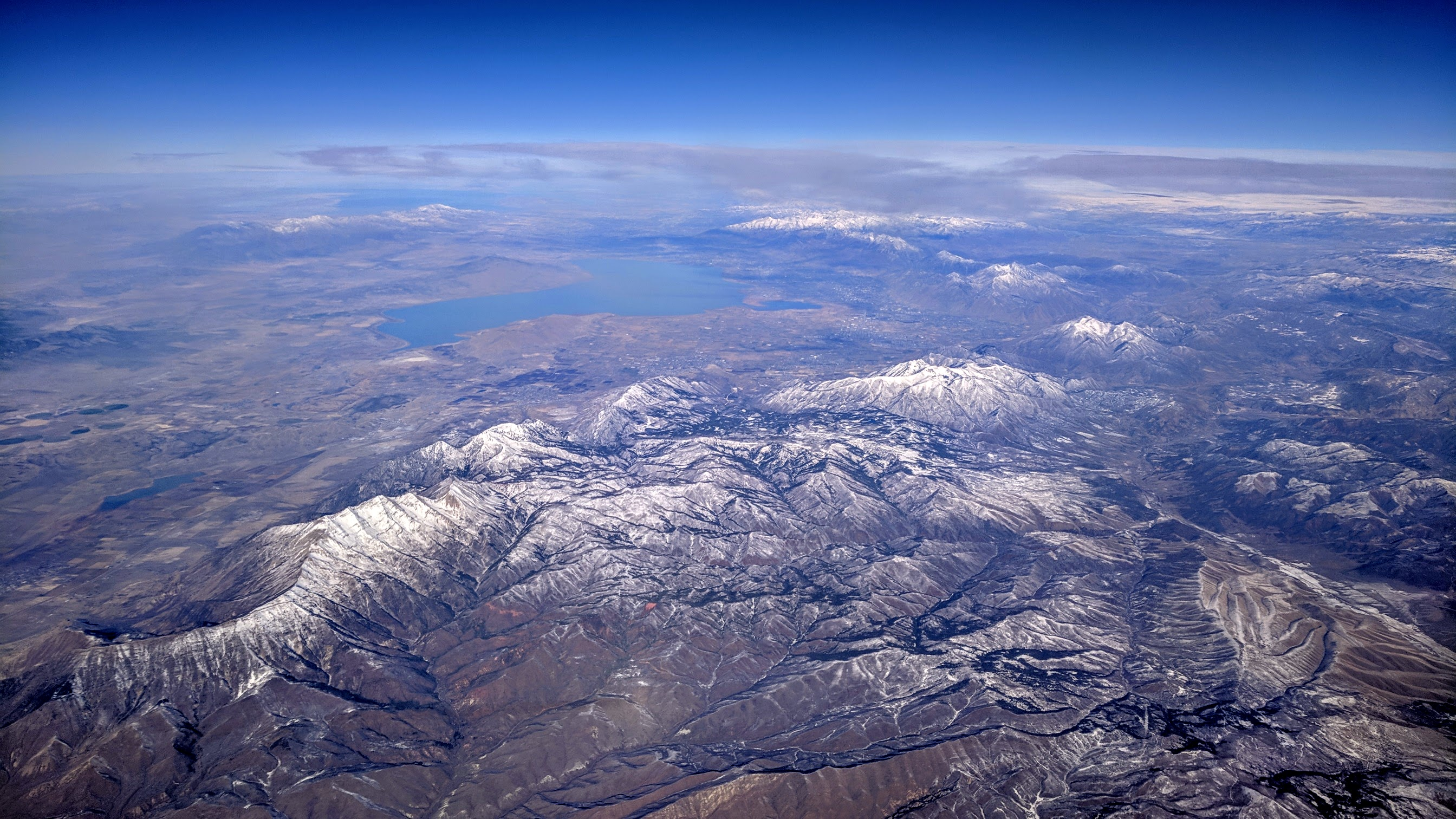
Mount Nebo (left of center) aerial view from the south, with Utah Lake and the rest of the Wasatch Range in the background and the Great Salt Lake on the far left horizon

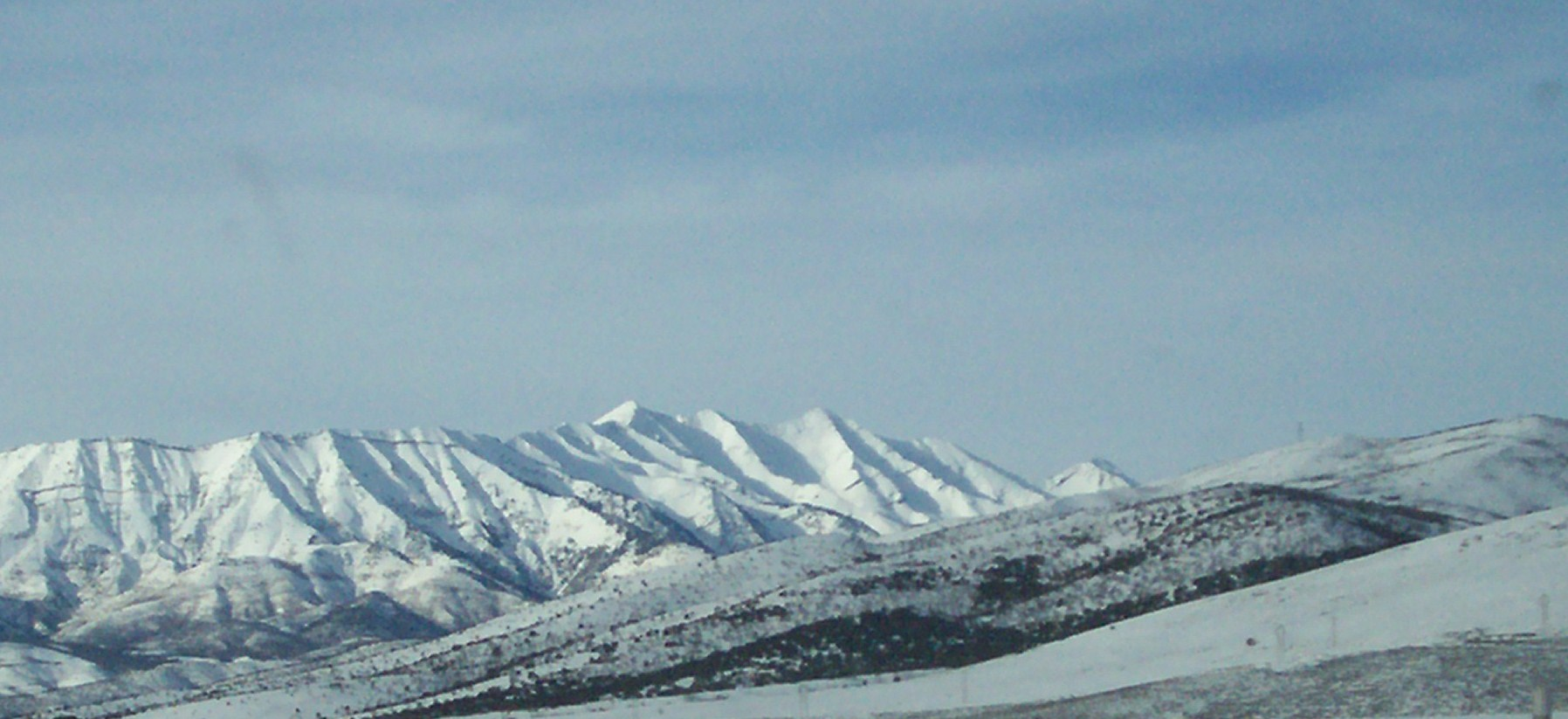
Mount Nebo eastern side during winter

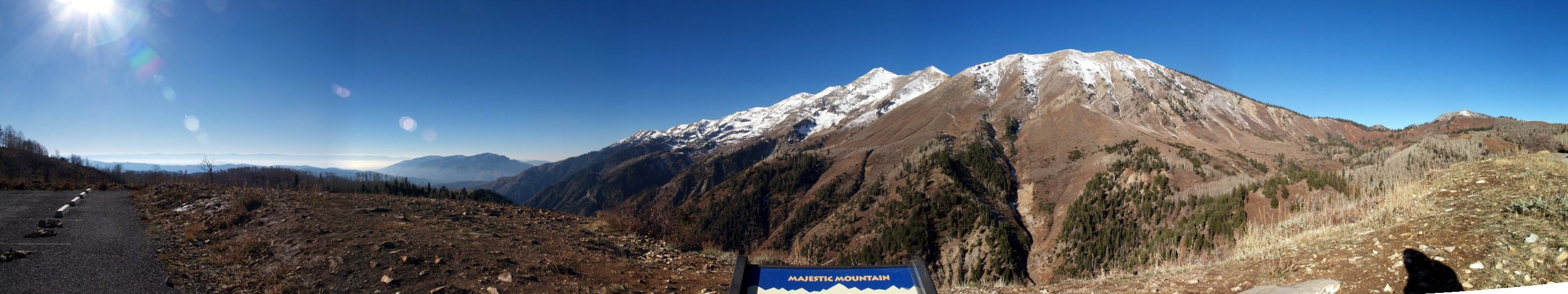
Panorama of Mount Nebo, 2007

== See also ==
- List of Ultras of the United States
