= Santaquin, Utah =

City in Utah, United States

- City
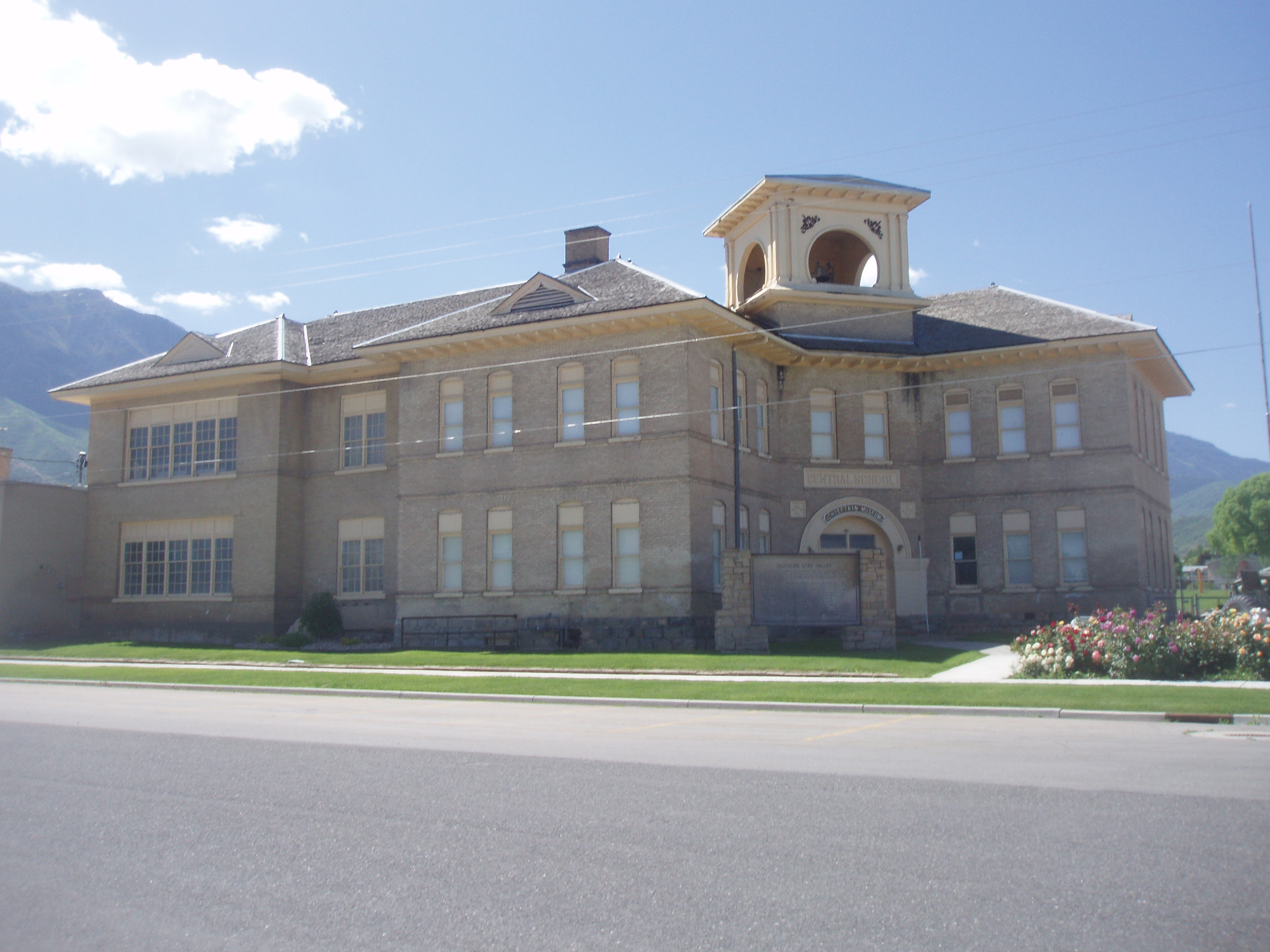
- Old Santaquin Elementary School is now the Santaquin Chieftain Museum.

- Location in Utah County and the state of Utah
- Coordinates: 39°59′30″N 111°45′54″W
- Country: United States
- State: Utah
- Counties: Utah, Juab
- Settled: 1851
- Incorporated: 1890s (town), 1932 (city)
- Named for: a Ute chief

Area
  - Total: 10.44 sq mi (27.05 km^{2})
  - Land: 10.44 sq mi (27.05 km^{2})
  - Water: 0 sq mi (0.00 km^{2})
- Elevation: 4,987 ft (1,520 m)

Population (2020)
  - Total: 13,725
  - Density: 1,314.1/sq mi (507.39/km^{2})
- Time zone: UTC-7 (Mountain (MST))
  - Summer (DST): UTC-6 (MDT)
- ZIP code: 84655
- Area codes: 385, 801
- FIPS code: 49-67770
- GNIS feature ID: 2411829
- Website: www.santaquin.gov

Santaquin (/ˈsæntəkwɪn/ SAN-tə-kwin) is a city in Utah and Juab counties in the U.S. state of Utah. It is part of the Provo–Orem metropolitan area. The population was 13,725 at the 2020 census.

== Geography ==
Santaquin lies southeast of Utah Lake in southern Utah County, with a small portion extending south into Juab County. It is bordered to the northwest by Genola and to the north by unincorporated Spring Lake. Interstate 15 passes through the city, with access from Exits 242 and 244. I-15 leads north 21 miles (34 km) to Provo and south 19 miles (31 km) to Nephi. U.S. Route 6 passes through Santaquin as Main Street and leads west 24 miles (39 km) to Silver City. Utah State Route 198 leads north from I-15 5 miles (8 km) to Payson.

According to the United States Census Bureau, Santaquin has a total area of 10.4 square miles (26.9 km^{2}), of which 0.3 acres (1,204 m^{2}), or 0.01%, are water.

=== Climate ===
This climatic region is typified by large seasonal temperature differences, with hot summers and cold (sometimes severely cold) winters. According to the Köppen Climate Classification system, Santaquin has a humid continental climate, abbreviated "Dfa" on climate maps.

Climate data for Santaquin, Utah, 1991–2020 normals, extremes 1914–present
Month	Jan	Feb	Mar	Apr	May	Jun	Jul	Aug	Sep	Oct	Nov	Dec	Year
Record high °F (°C)	64 (18)	71 (22)	86 (30)	88 (31)	96 (36)	104 (40)	108 (42)	104 (40)	99 (37)	88 (31)	78 (26)	69 (21)	108 (42)
Mean maximum °F (°C)	53.8 (12.1)	58.8 (14.9)	70.8 (21.6)	78.6 (25.9)	86.3 (30.2)	94.4 (34.7)	99.6 (37.6)	97.6 (36.4)	91.7 (33.2)	81.9 (27.7)	67.3 (19.6)	56.0 (13.3)	100.2 (37.9)
Mean daily maximum °F (°C)	37.4 (3.0)	42.3 (5.7)	52.2 (11.2)	58.9 (14.9)	69.2 (20.7)	80.9 (27.2)	90.0 (32.2)	88.2 (31.2)	78.1 (25.6)	63.7 (17.6)	48.7 (9.3)	37.6 (3.1)	62.3 (16.8)
Daily mean °F (°C)	28.6 (−1.9)	33.0 (0.6)	41.6 (5.3)	47.7 (8.7)	56.8 (13.8)	67.2 (19.6)	76.3 (24.6)	74.5 (23.6)	64.5 (18.1)	51.0 (10.6)	38.5 (3.6)	28.9 (−1.7)	50.7 (10.4)
Mean daily minimum °F (°C)	19.8 (−6.8)	23.8 (−4.6)	31.1 (−0.5)	36.4 (2.4)	44.4 (6.9)	53.4 (11.9)	62.5 (16.9)	60.8 (16.0)	50.8 (10.4)	38.4 (3.6)	28.3 (−2.1)	20.1 (−6.6)	39.2 (4.0)
Mean minimum °F (°C)	2.4 (−16.4)	7.0 (−13.9)	16.7 (−8.5)	23.6 (−4.7)	30.4 (−0.9)	38.1 (3.4)	51.3 (10.7)	49.9 (9.9)	35.9 (2.2)	24.0 (−4.4)	10.9 (−11.7)	3.3 (−15.9)	−1.7 (−18.7)
Record low °F (°C)	−22 (−30)	−19 (−28)	−6 (−21)	6 (−14)	22 (−6)	29 (−2)	37 (3)	35 (2)	22 (−6)	5 (−15)	−12 (−24)	−20 (−29)	−22 (−30)
Average precipitation inches (mm)	1.83 (46)	1.63 (41)	1.94 (49)	2.20 (56)	1.91 (49)	0.91 (23)	0.73 (19)	0.76 (19)	1.19 (30)	1.80 (46)	1.53 (39)	1.92 (49)	18.35 (466)
Average snowfall inches (cm)	13.4 (34)	13.3 (34)	6.9 (18)	3.3 (8.4)	0.0 (0.0)	0.0 (0.0)	0.0 (0.0)	0.0 (0.0)	0.1 (0.25)	0.8 (2.0)	5.6 (14)	11.7 (30)	55.1 (140)
Average precipitation days (≥ 0.01 in)	7.6	7.3	7.5	8.1	7.2	4.1	3.3	3.8	5.0	5.8	6.4	6.7	73.8
Average snowy days (≥ 0.1 in)	5.0	4.4	2.8	1.7	0.1	0.0	0.0	0.0	0.0	0.4	2.6	5.3	22.3
Source: NOAA

== History ==
Santaquin, one of the early settlements along the Salt Lake Road, was originally settled in late 1851. It was originally named Summit City because of its location near the summit of the divide between Utah Valley and Juab Valley. Summit City was settled by pioneers who were helping settle nearby Payson to the north. In 1856 it was renamed "Santaquin" for the son of Guffich, a local native chieftain friendly to the settlers. Santaquin incorporated as a town in the 1890s and changed to a city effective January 4, 1932.

== Demographics ==
Historical population
Census	Pop.	Note	%±
1860	158		—
1870	602		281.0%
1880	715		18.8%
1890	769		7.6%
1900	889		15.6%
1910	915		2.9%
1920	976		6.7%
1930	1,115		14.2%
1940	1,297		16.3%
1950	1,214		−6.4%
1960	1,183		−2.6%
1970	1,236		4.5%
1980	2,175		76.0%
1990	2,386		9.7%
2000	4,834		102.6%
2010	9,128		88.8%
2020	13,725		50.4%
U.S. Decennial Census

=== 2020 census ===
As of the 2020 census, Santaquin had a population of 13,725. The median age was 26.1 years. 38.8% of residents were under the age of 18 and 6.7% of residents were 65 years of age or older. For every 100 females there were 102.7 males, and for every 100 females age 18 and over there were 102.0 males age 18 and over.

76.9% of residents lived in urban areas, while 23.1% lived in rural areas.

There were 3,565 households in Santaquin, of which 59.5% had children under the age of 18 living in them. Of all households, 77.6% were married-couple households, 8.3% were households with a male householder and no spouse or partner present, and 10.7% were households with a female householder and no spouse or partner present. About 8.3% of all households were made up of individuals and 3.3% had someone living alone who was 65 years of age or older.

There were 3,678 housing units, of which 3.1% were vacant. The homeowner vacancy rate was 1.4% and the rental vacancy rate was 5.7%.

Racial composition as of the 2020 census
Race	Number	Percent
White	11,699	85.2%
Black or African American	29	0.2%
American Indian and Alaska Native	112	0.8%
Asian	23	0.2%
Native Hawaiian and Other Pacific Islander	49	0.4%
Some other race	732	5.3%
Two or more races	1,081	7.9%
Hispanic or Latino (of any race)	1,905	13.9%

=== 2000 census ===
As of the 2000 census, there were 4,834 people, 1,304 households, and 1,155 families residing in the city. The population density was 1,848.8 people per square mile (715.1/km^{2}). There were 1,364 housing units at an average density of 521.7 per square mile (201.8/km^{2}). The racial makeup of the city was 91.54% White, 0.17% African American, 0.62% Native American, 0.17% Asian, 0.06% Pacific Islander, 6.08% from other races, and 1.37% from two or more races. Hispanic or Latino of any race were 8.56% of the population.

There were 1,304 households, out of which 61.1% had children under the age of 18 living with them, 77.8% were married couples living together, 7.5% had a female householder with no husband present, and 11.4% were non-families. 9.3% of all households were made up of individuals, and 4.0% had someone living alone who was 65 years of age or older. The average household size was 3.71 and the average family size was 3.97.

In the city, the population was spread out, with 42.3% under the age of 18, 11.3% from 18 to 24, 29.1% from 25 to 44, 12.4% from 45 to 64, and 4.9% who were 65 years of age or older. The median age was 23 years. For every 100 females, there were 105.3 males. For every 100 females age 18 and over, there were 99.6 males.

The median income for a household in the city was $44,531, and the median income for a family was $45,323. Males had a median income of $35,076 versus $20,581 for females. The per capita income for the city was $13,725. About 1.9% of families and 2.2% of the population were below the poverty line, including 1.6% of those under age 18 and 6.1% of those age 65 or over.

Main Street has a few stores and restaurants but no big-box stores. Santaquin has been growing significantly since the early 2000's, with notable expansion in the Summit Ridge area, and the neighborhood on the north end of town.

== Education ==
Portions in Utah County are in Nebo School District.

Portions in Juab County are in the Juab School District.

== Attractions and events ==
=== Orchard Days ===
Orchard Days is a week-long celebration in late July and early August with a multitude of activities including a parade, rodeo, carnival, scavenger hunt, and several other family-friendly activities.

== Notable persons ==
- Gary Coleman (1968–2010), actor; resident

== See also ==
- List of cities and towns in Utah
