= Mosida, Utah =

Ghost town in Utah County, Utah, United States

Mosida
- Ghost town
- Location within Utah Location within the United States
- Coordinates: 40°07′38″N 111°57′24″W
- Country: United States
- State: Utah
- County (United States): Utah
- Established: c. 1910
- Abandoned: 1924
- Named for: Morrison, Simpson, Davis
- Elevation: 4,557 ft (1,389 m)
- GNIS feature ID: 1437643

Mosida (or infrequently Mosida-by-the-Lake) is a ghost town located on the southwestern shore of Utah Lake in Utah County, Utah, United States. The nearest inhabited town is Elberta, some 12 miles (19 km) to the south. A heavily promoted planned community in the 1910s, Mosida was ultimately a failure.

== History ==
The land was purchased from the Utah State Land Board in 1909 by a group of three men: R. E. Morrison, Joseph Simpson, and J. E. Davis. They planned to divide the land and sell it in tracts for peach orchards. They named their project Mosida, an acronym formed from the first two letters of each of their surnames. Within months they sold out to a group of promoters from Denver, Colorado who incorporated as the Mosida Fruit Lands Company.

The company began to improve the property and advertise to prospective investors and buyers. Since the land west of Utah Lake lacks any major streams, they built a pumphouse at the lake's edge, dug irrigation ditches, and installed a series of pumps to water the farmland. A large boarding house was constructed to house up to 250 workers. In 1911 the boarding house filled with workmen from surrounding towns, recruited to clear and plow the land and plant apple and peach seedlings. A steam tractor pulling a massive gang plow was used to break up the soil

By 1912, 8,000 acres (32 km^{2}) of land had been plowed, 50,000 fruit trees planted, and 50,000 US bushels (1,800 m^{3}) of grain harvested. The company built a 25-room luxury hotel which became the town landmark, used to house tourists and prospective investors. Those who came to consider purchasing tracts of land or shares of stock were given a grand tour and a powerful sales pitch about Mosida's natural advantages and bright future. No expense was spared to impress the guests; a fine passenger boat ferried them across the lake to and from Provo. Locals sometimes used the boat as a dance floor for parties. The Mosida Fruit Lands Company soon added more houses, a store, a post office, and even a school. They imported two French cooks to provide their workers the best of meals at the boarding house. The company's salesmanship was effective; by 1913 some 400 people had moved to Mosida and were working the farms and orchards.

The new residents quickly found that life in Mosida did not live up to the promotional literature's glowing descriptions. The fruit trees began to die due to high salt and mineral levels. Other crops such as wheat and peanuts were more productive, but swarms of grasshoppers damaged the surviving crops, especially the alfalfa. Transportation to and from the isolated site was a challenge, and became even harder when the Mosida boat was destroyed in a fire on April 17, 1913. The pumping and irrigation operations also proved more expensive than planned, despite a second pumping plant installed in 1914. The lake level fluctuated widely from year to year, dropping so low in 1915 that the water could no longer be pumped. Individual landowners and the company itself found themselves increasingly in debt, and in 1915 the Mosida Fruit Lands Company was placed under court-ordered receivership. Creditors tried to keep the project going for a few more years, but by 1917 most people had left. The population dropped to 67 by 1920, and with no more water or power available Mosida died. The last resident stayed until 1924.

Some ruins of Mosida still stand, including the foundations of the hotel and schoolhouse and the concrete walls of a pumphouse.

== See also ==
- List of ghost towns in Utah
