= Utah Valley =

Valley in Utah County, Utah, United States

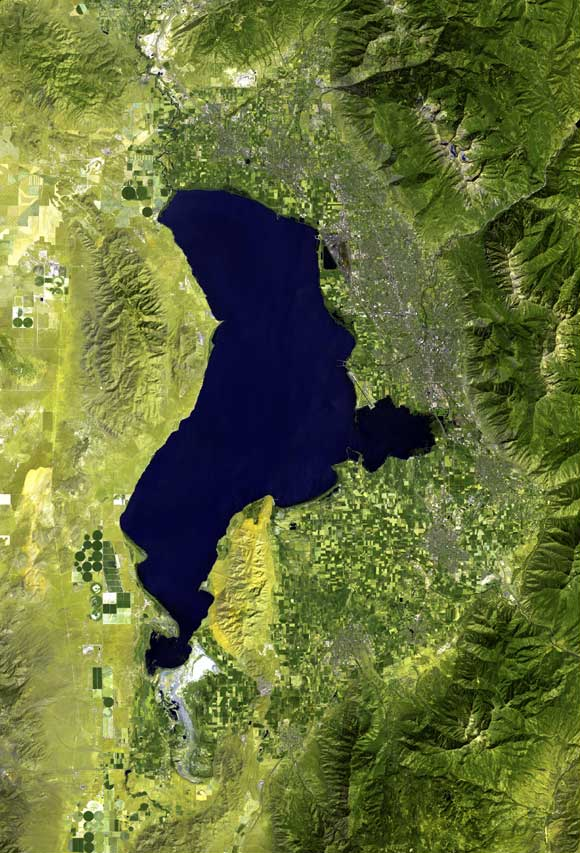
- Satellite image of Utah Valley, 2006

- Location within the United States
- Depth: 1,378 to 1,579 m (4,521 to 5,180 ft)

Geography
- Location: Utah County, Utah, United States
- Population centers: Provo
- Coordinates: 40°10′N 111°40′W
- Interactive map of Utah Valley

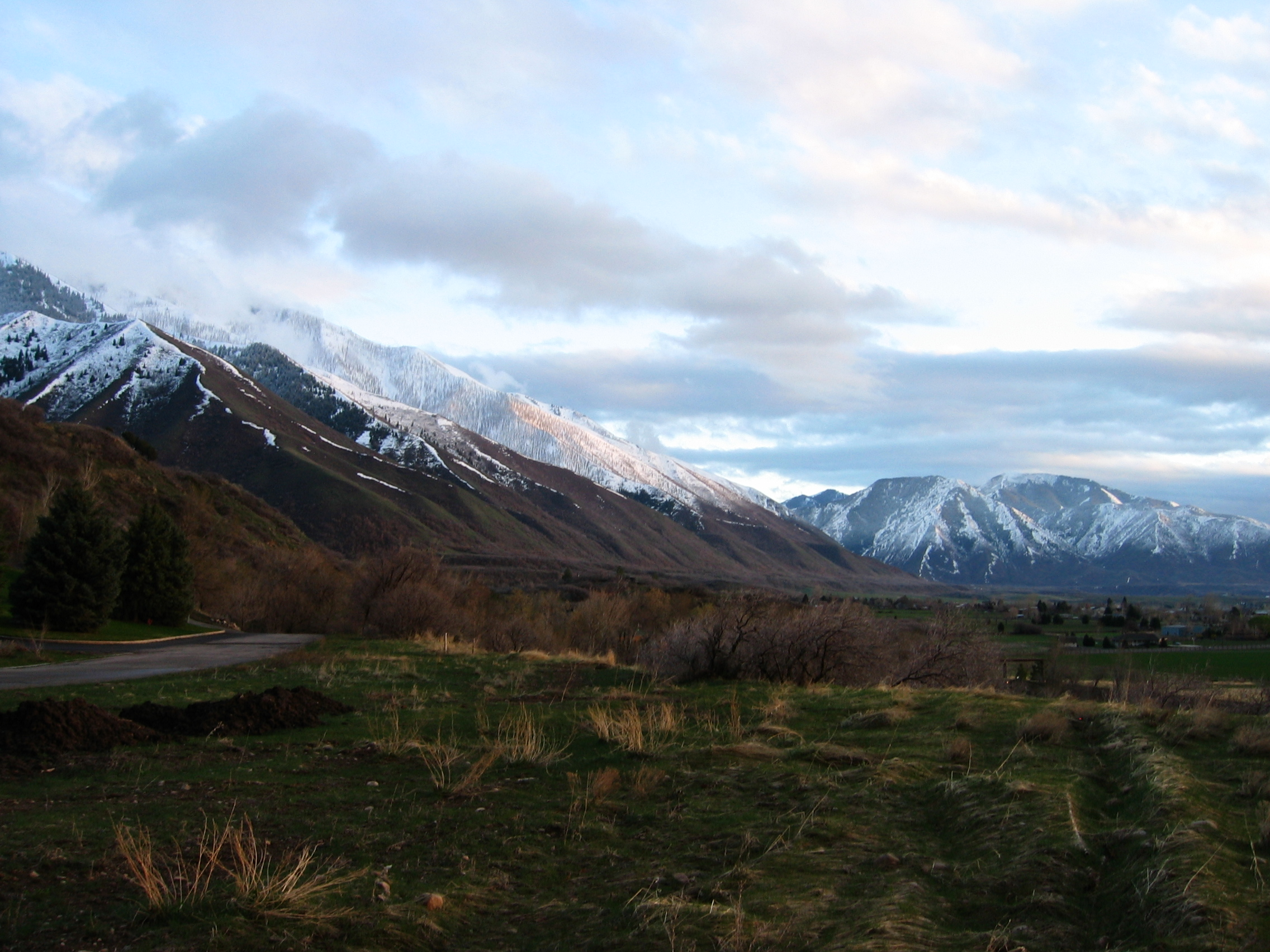
Part of the Wasatch Range forming the Utah Valley.

Utah Valley is a valley in North Central Utah located in Utah County, and is considered part of the Wasatch Front. It contains the cities of Provo, Lehi, and Orem, and their suburbs, including Alpine, American Fork, Cedar Hills, Elk Ridge, Highland, Lindon, Mapleton, Payson, Pleasant Grove, Salem, Santaquin, Saratoga Springs, Spanish Fork, Springville, Vineyard and Woodland Hills. It is known colloquially as "Happy Valley".

== Geography ==
Utah Lake is a natural shallow fresh water lake in its center. All rivers in the valley flow into Utah Lake, which itself empties into the Jordan River to the north. That river flows into the Salt Lake Valley through the Jordan Narrows, a gap in the Traverse Mountains. Geographic borders of the Utah Valley are the following; The Traverse Mountains and West Traverse Mountains to the north, the Wasatch mountains to the east, Juab Pass to the south, and Goshen Pass, West Mountain, Utah Lake, the Lake Mountains, and Cedar Pass to the west.

The geography of Utah Valley combined with the prevalence of fossil fuel burning vehicles leads to poor air quality in Utah.

== Economy ==
The northern part of Utah Valley is considered the center of Silicon Slopes and includes headquarters and regional offices of many prominent technology companies, including Adobe, Ancestry, Entrata, Intel/Micron joint venture IM Flash, Microsoft, Oracle, SanDisk, Qualtrics, Vivint, Workfront, and Xactware. The region also houses a large NSA data center.

== Education ==
Utah Valley University and Brigham Young University are located in Orem and Provo respectively. They are two of the largest universities in the state and represent approximately 78,000 students.

== Demographics ==
Most inhabitants of Utah Valley are members of the Church of Jesus Christ of Latter-day Saints, which operates seven temples in the valley. These include the Provo Utah Rock Canyon Temple in Provo, the Mount Timpanogos Utah Temple in American Fork, the Payson Utah Temple in Payson, the Provo City Center Temple in Provo, the Saratoga Springs Utah Temple in Saratoga Springs, the Orem Utah Temple in Orem, and the Lindon Utah Temple in Lindon. The final three of which were dedicated in 2023, 2024, and 2026 respectively.

The population of Utah Valley is estimated at 575,205 by the United States Census Bureau. The growth in the area has been significant. In 1970, 1980, 1994, 2009 the population was 125,005; 204,102; 277,179; and 555,551 respectively. The most populous city is Provo, with a population count of 114,801 inhabitants.

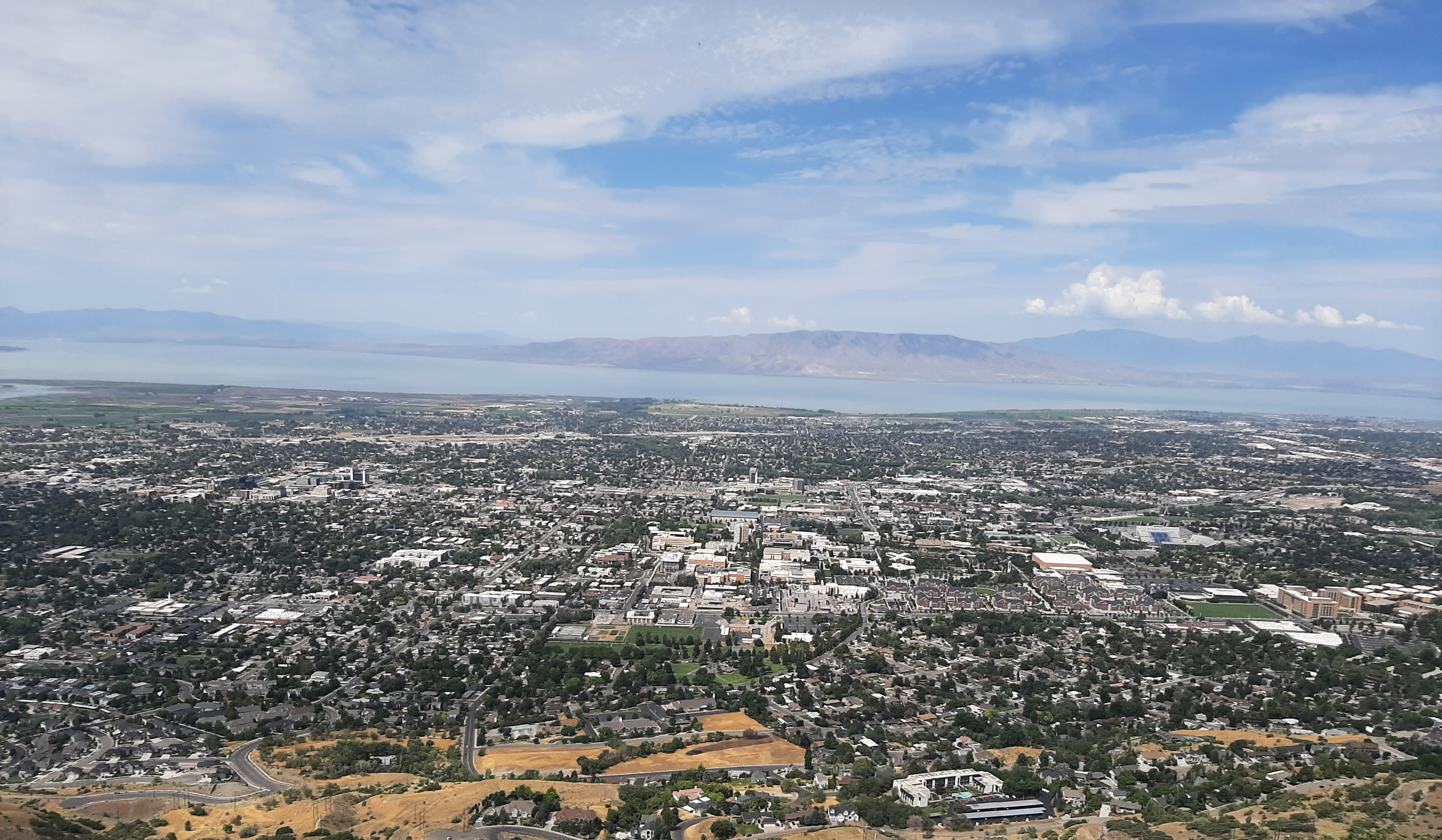
View of Utah Valley, 2021
