= Mona, Utah =

City in Utah, United States

- City
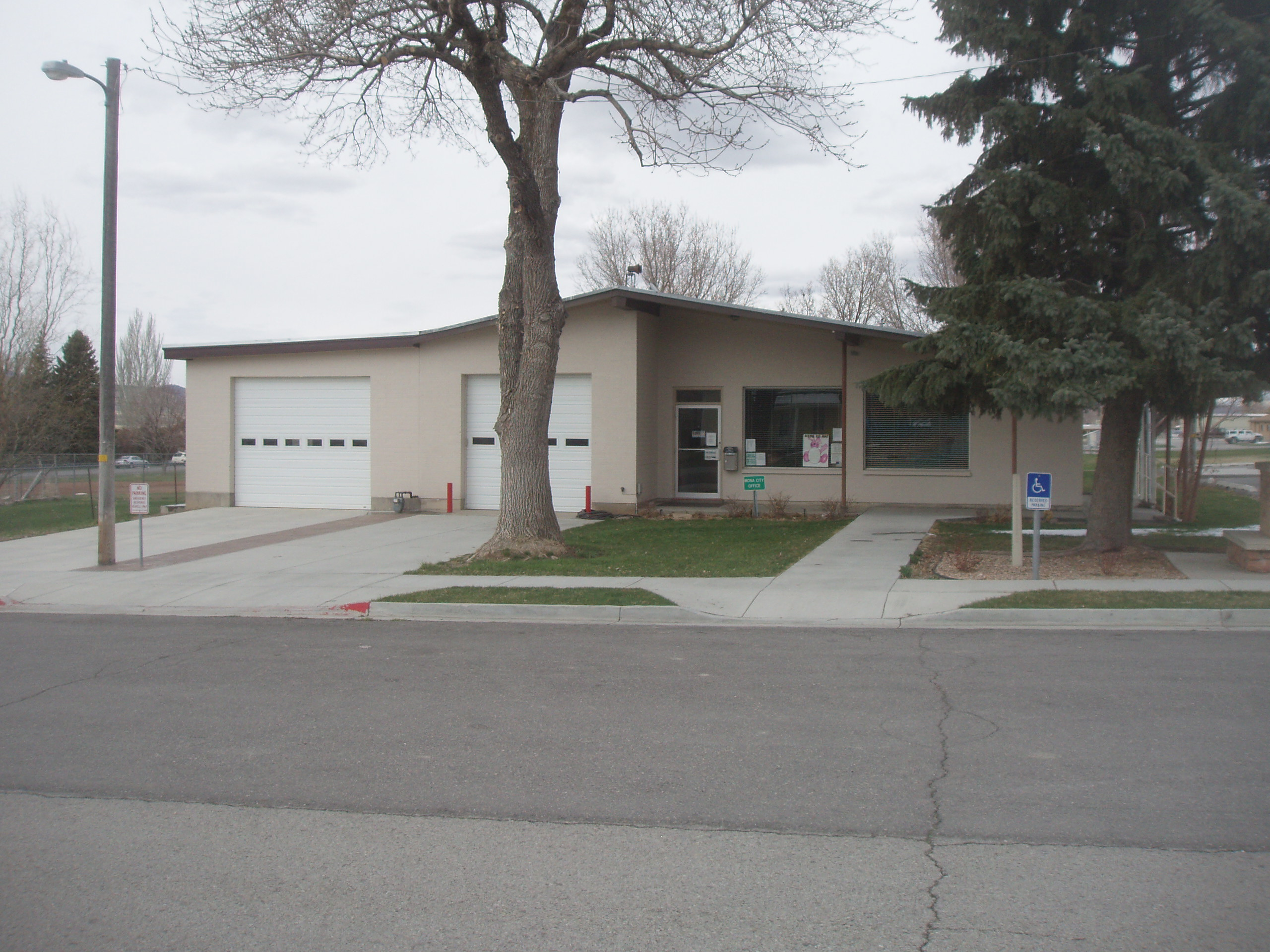
- Mona city office

- Location in Juab County and state of Utah
- Coordinates: 39°48′55″N 111°51′23″W
- Country: United States
- State: Utah
- County: Juab
- Settled: 1852
- Incorporated: 1924
- Became a city: April 1, 2001
- Named for: Isle of Man

Government
  - Mayor: Bill Mills

Area
  - Total: 2.62 sq mi (6.79 km^{2})
  - Land: 2.59 sq mi (6.71 km^{2})
  - Water: 0.031 sq mi (0.08 km^{2})
- Elevation: 4,974 ft (1,516 m)

Population (2020)
  - Total: 1,750
  - Density: 698/sq mi (269.4/km^{2})
- Time zone: UTC-7 (Mountain (MST))
  - Summer (DST): UTC-6 (MDT)
- ZIP code: 84645
- Area code: 435
- FIPS code: 49-51140
- GNIS feature ID: 1443548
- Website: www.monautah.gov

Mona is a city in Juab County, Utah, United States. As of the 2020 census it had a population of 1,750. It is part of the Provo–Orem metropolitan area.

The city is about halfway between Santaquin and Nephi along Interstate 15. The population was 850 at the 2000 census, which at the time was sufficient under Utah state law for Mona to become a city. It did so in 2001.

A farm owned by Young Living raises 200 acres (0.81 km^{2}) of lavender on the north side of town. Mona is known for its annual Lavender Festival.

== History ==
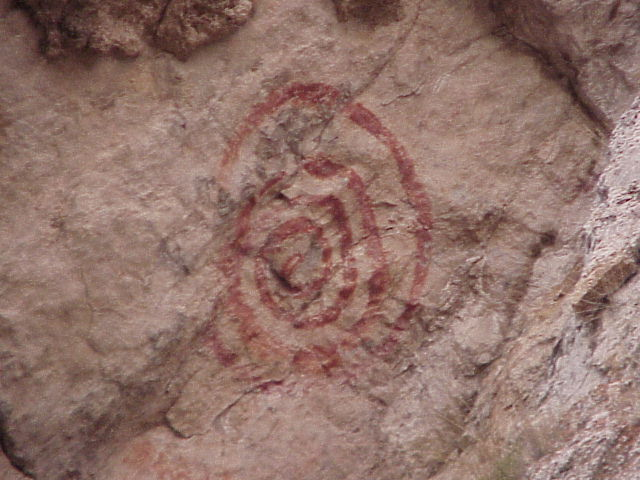
Native American rock art near Mona

Mona, one of the early settlements along the old Arrowhead Trail, was originally settled in 1852. First named Clover Creek for patches of wild clover that grew along the creek in the area, it was later renamed Willow Creek for its water source, then Starr for a local settler, before receiving its present name.

When he was a traveling worker and singer in the early 1930s, Burl Ives was once jailed in Mona for singing "Foggy Foggy Dew", because it was considered bawdy by the authorities.

== Geography ==
Mona is located in northeastern Juab County at 39°48′55″N 111°51′23″W (39.815392, -111.856354). Interstate 15 passes along the eastern edge of the city limits, with access from Exit 233. I-15 leads north 12 miles (19 km) to Santaquin and 33 miles (53 km) to Provo, while to the south it leads 9 miles (14 km) to Nephi.

According to the United States Census Bureau, Mona has a total area of 2.8 square miles (7.3 km^{2}), of which 0.04 square miles (0.1 km^{2}), or 1.50%, are water. Part of the Mona Reservoir is in the northwest corner of the city. The reservoir is an impoundment on Currant Creek, which flows north to Utah Lake.

Mount Nebo, the southernmost and highest mountain in the Wasatch Range, rises 5 miles (8 km) east of Mona to an elevation of 11,928 feet (3,636 m).

== Demographics ==
Historical population
Census	Pop.	Note	%±
1870	315		—
1880	503		59.7%
1890	469		−6.8%
1900	469		0.0%
1910	467		−0.4%
1920	408		−12.6%
1930	338		−17.2%
1940	357		5.6%
1950	328		−8.1%
1960	347		5.8%
1970	309		−11.0%
1980	536		73.5%
1990	584		9.0%
2000	850		45.5%
2010	1,547		82.0%
2020	1,750		13.1%
U.S. Decennial Census

=== 2020 census ===
As of the 2020 census, Mona had a population of 1,750. The median age was 31.2 years, 35.8% of residents were under the age of 18, and 10.5% of residents were 65 years of age or older. For every 100 females there were 105.2 males, and for every 100 females age 18 and over there were 99.3 males age 18 and over.

0.0% of residents lived in urban areas, while 100.0% lived in rural areas.

There were 480 households in Mona, of which 51.7% had children under the age of 18 living in them. Of all households, 78.3% were married-couple households, 8.1% were households with a male householder and no spouse or partner present, and 11.7% were households with a female householder and no spouse or partner present. About 12.5% of all households were made up of individuals and 4.6% had someone living alone who was 65 years of age or older.

There were 501 housing units, of which 4.2% were vacant. The homeowner vacancy rate was 1.1% and the rental vacancy rate was 9.4%.

Racial composition as of the 2020 census
Race	Number	Percent
White	1,661	94.9%
Black or African American	2	0.1%
American Indian and Alaska Native	3	0.2%
Asian	1	0.1%
Native Hawaiian and Other Pacific Islander	10	0.6%
Some other race	14	0.8%
Two or more races	59	3.4%
Hispanic or Latino (of any race)	51	2.9%

=== 2000 census ===
As of the 2000 census, there were 850 people, 232 households, and 203 families residing in the town. The population density was 614.1 people per square mile (237.8/km^{2}). There were 243 housing units at an average density of 175.5 per square mile (68.0/km^{2}). The racial makeup of the town was 98.24% White, 0.35% Native American, 0.12% Asian, 0.12% from other races, and 1.18% from two or more races. Hispanic or Latino of any race were 1.41% of the population.

There were 232 households, out of which 53.0% had children under the age of 18 living with them, 77.2% were married couples living together, 6.9% had a female householder with no husband present, and 12.1% were non-families. 9.9% of all households were made up of individuals, and 6.0% had someone living alone who was 65 years of age or older. The average household size was 3.66 and the average family size was 3.97.

In the town the population was spread out, with 40.7% under the age of 18, 10.2% from 18 to 24, 25.4% from 25 to 44, 16.6% from 45 to 64, and 7.1% who were 65 years of age or older. The median age was 24 years. For every 100 females, there were 95.0 males. For every 100 females age 18 and over, there were 96.1 males.

The median income for a household in the town was $49,464, and the median income for a family was $50,625. Males had a median income of $35,982 versus $22,222 for females. The per capita income for the town was $14,474. About 0.5% of families and 2.4% of the population were below the poverty line, including 2.3% of those under age 18 and none of those age 65 or over.

== Education ==
It is in the Juab School District.

== See also ==
- List of cities and towns in Utah
