= Payson, Utah =

City in Utah, United States

- City
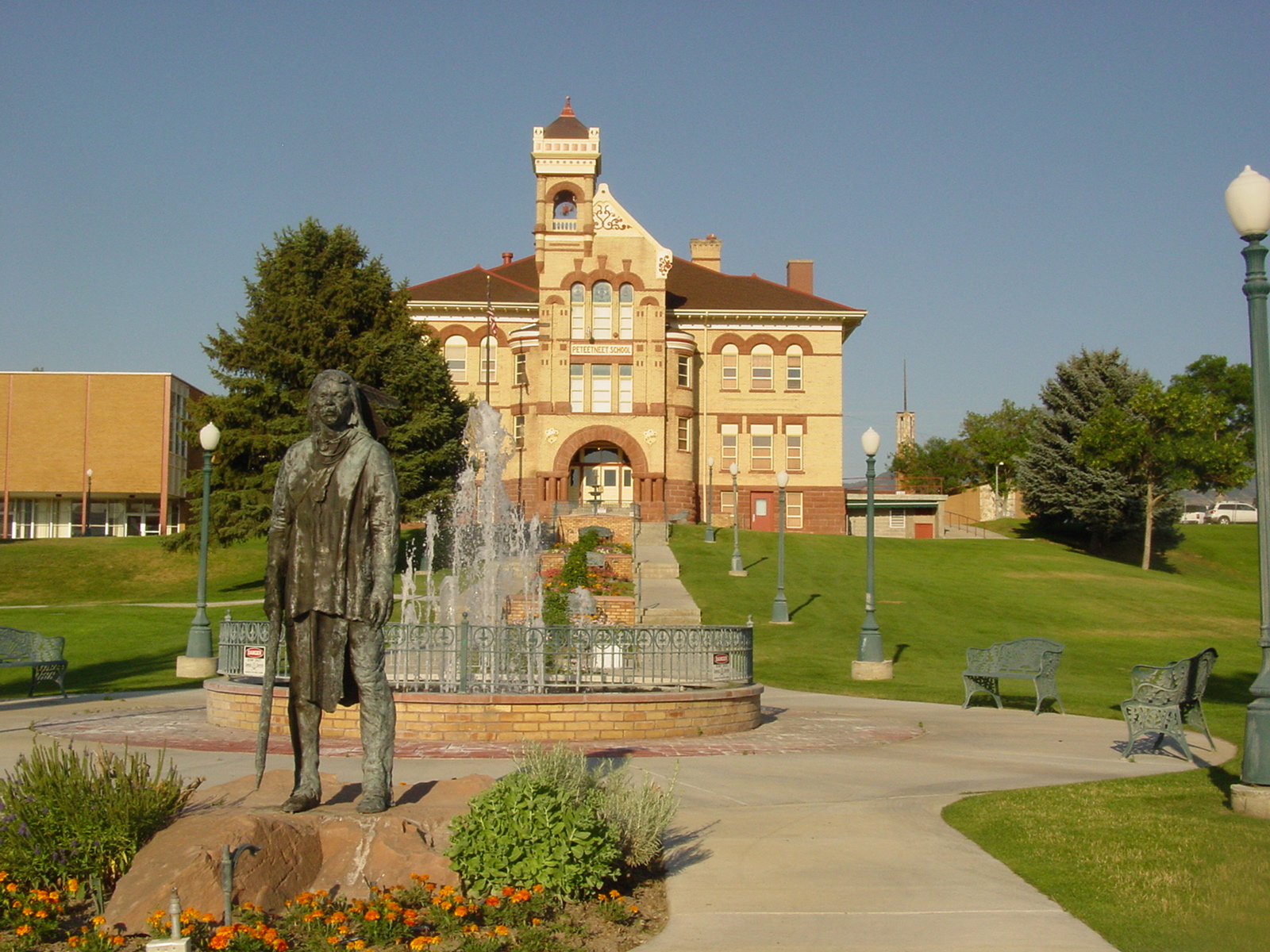
- Peteetneet Museum in Payson

- Location in Utah County and the state of Utah
- Coordinates: 40°2′20″N 111°43′59″W
- Country: United States
- State: Utah
- County: Utah
- Founded: October 20, 1850
- Incorporated: January 21, 1853
- Named for: Payson, Adams County, IL

Area
  - Total: 13.05 sq mi (33.81 km^{2})
  - Land: 13.04 sq mi (33.78 km^{2})
  - Water: 0.0077 sq mi (0.02 km^{2})
- Elevation: 4,669 ft (1,423 m)

Population (2020)
  - Total: 21,101
  - Density: 1,617.9/sq mi (624.66/km^{2})
- Time zone: UTC-7 (Mountain)
  - Summer (DST): UTC-6 (Mountain)
- ZIP code: 84651
- Area codes: 385, 801
- FIPS code: 49-58730
- GNIS feature ID: 2411391
- Website: www.paysonutah.gov

Payson is a city in Utah County, Utah, United States. It is part of the Provo–Orem metropolitan area. The population was 21,101 at the 2020 census.

== History ==
Pioneers from the Church of Jesus Christ of Latter-day Saints led by James Edward Pace Jr. first settled what is now Payson, Utah. On October 20, 1850, Pace with his family and the families of John Courtland Searle and Andrew Jackson Stewart, totaling 16 settlers in all, arrived at their destination on Peteetneet Creek.

The settlement was originally named Peteetneet Creek. Peteetneet is the anglicized approximation of Pah-ti't-ni't, meaning "our water place" in the Timpanogos dialect of the Southern Paiute language. Chief Peteetneet was a clan leader of a band of Timpanogos Indigenous Americans whose village was on a stretch of the creek about a mile northwest of Payson's present city center. The village, when fully occupied, housed more than 200 of Chief Peteetneet's clan and near kinsmen. It served as a base from which seasonal hunting and foraging parties moved to the mountains each summer and fall.

Five months later, on the morning of March 23, 1851, Brigham Young, having lost confidence in the leadership of James Pace, released him from his calling and reorganized the community under Bishop Benjamin Cross. Then, in the afternoon, in a secular meeting, Brigham Young acting as Territorial Governor, designated the settlement on Peteetneet Creek as Payson, Utah County, Utah Territory. He acknowledged naming the town after Payson, Illinois, a small town in Adams County near Quincy where kind citizens had taken in the Young family after they were driven from Missouri in 1839.

Most Paysonites/Paysonians will tell you the original name was Pace and Son or Pacen (after the leader of the original group of Mormon pioneers, James Pace and his son William B. Pace). It was then changed to Payson. After leaving Payson, Utah, James Pace then traveled south and founded Payson, Arizona.

In January 1853, Territorial Governor Brigham Young submitted a bill to the Second Utah Territorial Legislature to incorporate Payson as a city. On January 21, 1853, on the last day of the legislative session, the legislature passed the act. Brigham Young signed it. And Payson became an incorporated city within a strip of territory two miles wide on either side of Peteetneet Creek, extending from the shore Utah Lake to the top of the mountains to the south. On April 12, 1853, Payson voters elected a city council composed of aldermen and councilmen, the distinction between the two being uncertain. The voters also elected as the town's first mayor, David Crockett who had returned to Payson after James Pace's fall from power. He would serve as Mayor for 2 additional two-year terms and as an alderman until 1860.

On March 6, 1854, the LDS Church organized the Payson Ward as part of the Utah Stake with C. B. Hancock as Bishop and James McClellan and John Fairbanks as counselors. Bishop Cross, who was in declining health died on December 31 at age 65.

The Payson Tabernacle of the Church of Jesus Christ of Latter-day Saints was dedicated by Wilford Woodruff in 1872.

In 1873 the Payson independent school District established a high school, the first such institution in Utah south of Salt Lake City. It closed in 1876 after Brigham Young Academy opened in Provo, and a Presbyterian mission school offering education through grade 12 was established under Rev. Wildman Murphy. An opera house was built in Payson in 1883. In the late 1800s, a factory making horse collars operated in Payson.

When the Strawberry Valley Reclamation Project was completed in 1912, the Utah-Idaho Sugar Company decided to place a sugar beet processing factory in the area. The plant was completed in October 1913. By 1915, the biggest year for the factory, 5,014 acres (20.29 km^{2}) were planted, yielding 36,915 tons of sugar beets, which were processed into 7,722 tons of sugar.

In 1897, the beet leafhopper, Circulifer tenellus, the only known vector of the beet curly top virus (BCTV), invaded Utah County. Its transmission of the disease caused serious crop losses in Payson, Lehi and other areas of the county. As the disease grew worse, Payson farmers reduced beet acreage and planted other crops. Those willing to take a chance with beet contracts experienced declining yields. In 1924, beet growers all over Utah County experienced a complete crop failure. The result was that in 1924, Utah-Idaho Sugar closed its Payson and Lehi sugar factories. The factory was dismantled and demolished in 1940, leaving only the sugar warehouse. Beet contracts continued to be signed in the Payson area, and harvests were processed in the Utah-Idaho Sugar factory in Spanish Fork.

In 1940, the sugar factory property, which included only the sugar warehouse, was sold to the Utah Poultry Producers Co-operative Association (now Intermountain Farmers Association = IFA Country Stores), which used the building for grain storage until 1978. In 1979, this property located at 10460 South 4400 West in Payson became the present IFA fertilizer storage, blending, packaging and distribution facility.

== Demographics ==
Historical population
Census	Pop.	Note	%±
1860	830		—
1870	1,436		73.0%
1880	1,788		24.5%
1890	2,135		19.4%
1900	2,636		23.5%
1910	2,397		−9.1%
1920	3,031		26.4%
1930	3,045		0.5%
1940	3,591		17.9%
1950	3,998		11.3%
1960	4,237		6.0%
1970	4,501		6.2%
1980	8,246		83.2%
1990	9,510		15.3%
2000	12,716		33.7%
2010	18,294		43.9%
2020	21,101		15.3%
U.S. Decennial Census

=== 2020 census ===
As of the 2020 census, Payson had a population of 21,101. The median age was 28.9 years, and 33.5% of residents were under the age of 18 while 11.2% were 65 years of age or older. For every 100 females there were 100.4 males, and for every 100 females age 18 and over there were 99.8 males age 18 and over.

96.1% of residents lived in urban areas, while 3.9% lived in rural areas.

There were 6,029 households in Payson, of which 48.9% had children under the age of 18 living in them. Of all households, 65.0% were married-couple households, 12.1% were households with a male householder and no spouse or partner present, and 18.6% were households with a female householder and no spouse or partner present. About 13.6% of all households were made up of individuals and 6.0% had someone living alone who was 65 years of age or older.

There were 6,256 housing units, of which 3.6% were vacant. The homeowner vacancy rate was 0.9% and the rental vacancy rate was 5.1%.

Racial composition as of the 2020 census
Race	Number	Percent
White	17,440	82.7%
Black or African American	81	0.4%
American Indian and Alaska Native	139	0.7%
Asian	94	0.4%
Native Hawaiian and Other Pacific Islander	94	0.4%
Some other race	1,616	7.7%
Two or more races	1,637	7.8%
Hispanic or Latino (of any race)	3,589	17.0%

=== 2000 census ===
As of the census of 2000, there were 12,716 people, 3,654 households, and 3,058 families residing in the city. The population density was 1,871.8 people per square mile (723.1/km^{2}). There were 3,855 housing units at an average density of 567.5 per square mile (219.2/km^{2}). The racial makeup of the city was 94.02% White, 0.13% African American, 0.39% Native American, 0.38% Asian, 0.24% Pacific Islander, 3.52% from other races, and 1.33% from two or more races. Hispanic or Latino of any race were 6.79% of the population.

There were 3,654 households, out of which 51.8% had children under the age of 18 living with them, 70.8% were married couples living together, 9.6% had a female householder with no husband present, and 16.3% were non-families. 14.3% of all households were made up of individuals, and 6.8% had someone living alone who was 65 years of age or older. The average household size was 3.47 and the average family size was 3.87.

In the city, the population was spread out, with 38.3% under the age of 18, 12.8% from 18 to 24, 26.0% from 25 to 44, 14.8% from 45 to 64, and 8.2% who were 65 years of age or older. The median age was 24 years. For every 100 females, there were 101.8 males. For every 100 females age 18 and over, there were 96.7 males.

The median income for a household in the city was $43,539, and the median income for a family was $47,491. Males had a median income of $32,244 versus $20,869 for females. The per capita income for the city was $14,588. About 7.0% of families and 7.3% of the population were below the poverty line, including 7.9% of those under age 18 and 9.3% of those age 65 or over.

Payson's population has doubled in 1990–2010, when the population was 8,700. Payson was at the southern end of Utah valley's real estate boom.

== Culture ==
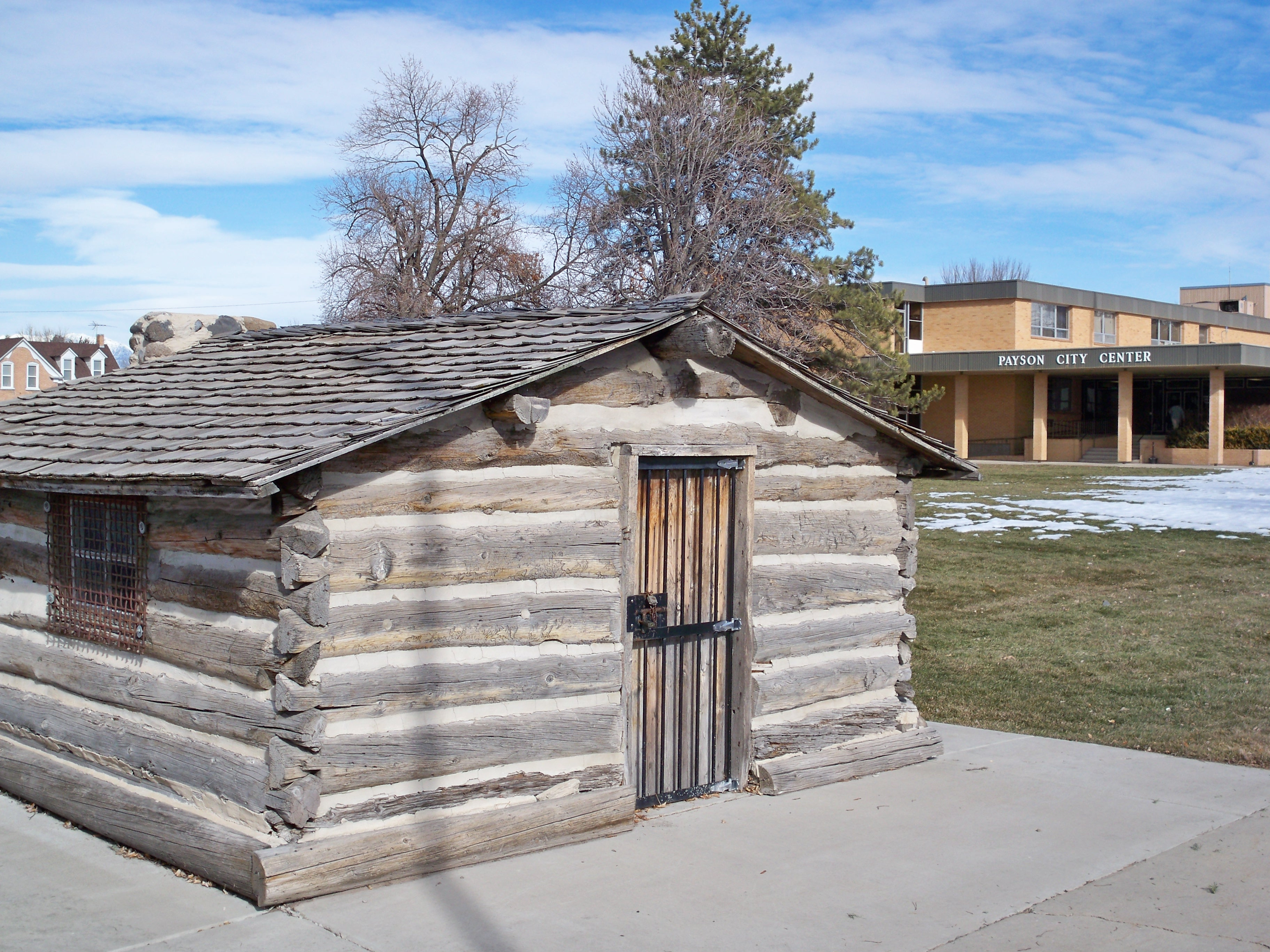
A historic cabin at Payson City Center

Payson is the site of the annual Scottish Heritage Festival, held every July. Other annual festivities include a salmon supper, held every August, and the annual Onion Days festival, held every Labor Day weekend. The city also has band concerts in the Memorial Park, and has had such concerts since the early 1950s.

Most of the movie Footloose (1984) was filmed in and around Payson, in settings such as Payson High School and Sudsie's, a local car wash. The town was also one of the locations for the thriller Warning Sign (1985). Payson was the setting of the children's movie Banjo the Woodpile Cat (1979), as the city was the childhood home of its director, the animator and film producer Don Bluth. The town is a film favorite for seminary videos filmed by the LDS Church. The Mormon-themed comedy film Baptists at Our Barbecue was also shot on Payson's historic Main Street. More recently, Payson was used to film most of the Disney Channel movie Hatching Pete.

Payson was originally named Peteetneet, after a Ute Indian chief who lived near Payson's current location. A monument still stands to Chief Peteetneet at the Peteetneet Museum and Cultural Arts Center, originally the first school in Payson. The Peteetneet Museum is a historical gem in the community and is known for its historical significance, beauty, and great sledding. A committee headed by Marva Loy Eggett has recently raised funds for the Peteetneet Museum glass elevator. Construction was completed on it the summer of 2008.

Payson celebrates its heritage through monuments such as the historic Main Street, Peteetneet Museum and Cultural Arts Center, and several Payson Historical Society markers that note houses and other sites in the city over 100 years old.

The city was the birthplace of singer-songwriter Jewel.

The city has large numbers of persons with Scottish and Scots-Irish ancestry. However, the expansion of the Salt Lake City metropolitan area into Payson has changed the city's ethnic and religious makeup with additions of Catholic (including Eastern Rite Catholic and Greek Catholic brought in by Greek, Italian and Yugoslav settlers), Presbyterian, Evangelical, and Wiccan. Payson, like Provo, has a predominantly Latter-day Saint population, but other religious sects and denominations such as Lutherans, Methodists, Roman Catholics and Southern Baptists. The imprint of Scandinavian settlement is found in thousands of residents with Scandinavian (Danish, Norwegian, Swedish, and Icelandic) surnames; Swiss people and Austrians; and since the 1930s, Mexican Americans among a few other Hispanics and Latinos.

On January 25, 2010, the Church of Jesus Christ of Latter-day Saints announced that a temple was to be built in Payson, the Payson Utah Temple. With construction completed before dedication on June 7, 2015, the Temple is the 15th in Utah and the 146th in the world.

== Schools ==
Payson is served by Nebo School District. Public schools in this district within Payson include the following: Payson High School, Payson Junior High School, Mt. Nebo Middle, Barnett Elementary, Parkview Elementary, Springlake Elementary, Taylor Elementary, Wilson Elementary. Payson High School is one of the very few schools in the USA that has its own Bagpipe Band..

== Annual events ==
Payson is home to the Onion Days and Salmon Supper events held every August and an annual Scottish Festival.

=== The Origins of Payson Onion Days: A Historical Journey ===
At the turn of the 20th century, many farmers in the Payson area faced significant hardships. Among them was Charlie Gale, a determined farmer seeking a viable crop to sustain his livelihood. His son, Elmer Gale, played a pivotal role in transforming the local agricultural landscape. Elmer, who made his living by purchasing crops from farmers and reselling them to local grocers, suggested that his father try growing onions, a crop that was in shorter supply and promised higher returns.

Elmer's suggestion proved to be fortuitous. Onions quickly became a lucrative cash crop for Charlie Gale, a respected early settler of Payson, who became one of the biggest onion producers in Payson history. Witnessing Charlie's success, other farmers in the Payson area soon followed suit, switching to onion cultivation. By 1929, Payson had established itself as a prominent agricultural district and an outstanding producer of onions.

Around this time, many communities across the country were initiating their own harvest festivals. Inspired by this trend, the residents of Payson decided to start their own celebration. They aimed to honor the town's agricultural heritage and its significant contribution to onion production. Thus, the Onion Harvest and Homecoming was born.

To pay tribute to Elmer Gale's influential role in the town's agricultural success, the inaugural Onion Days festival was suggested to be held on the anniversary of his birthday, September 2, 1929, though it was eventually moved to between September 12 and 14 that year. The celebration became an annual event, marking the town's deep-rooted connection to onion farming and community spirit.

== Notable people ==
- Earl W. Bascom, rodeo pioneer "Father of Modern Rodeo, cowboy artist and sculptor
- Don Bluth, animator and film producer
- Toby Bluth, Disney animator
- William Clayson, Mormon pioneer, LDS hymn writer
- Irene Colvin Corbett, only Mormon to die on the Titanic
- Brandon Flowers, lead singer of The Killers, lived in Payson
- Orson Pratt Huish, LDS hymn writer
- Kaycee Feild, World Rodeo Bareback Champion
- Lewis Feild, World Champion Bareback rider, hall of fame inductee
- Jewel Kilcher, singer-songwriter known as "Jewel", born in Payson
- Jesse Knight, Mormon pioneer, rancher, mining magnate, industrialist
- O. Raymond Knight, rancher, rodeo champion
- Dallin H. Oaks, LDS Apostle, attended elementary school in Payson
- Barret Peery, basketball head coach, Portland State
- Joseph L. Townsend, LDS hymn writer
