= Nephi, Utah =

City in and county seat of Juab County, Utah, United States

- City
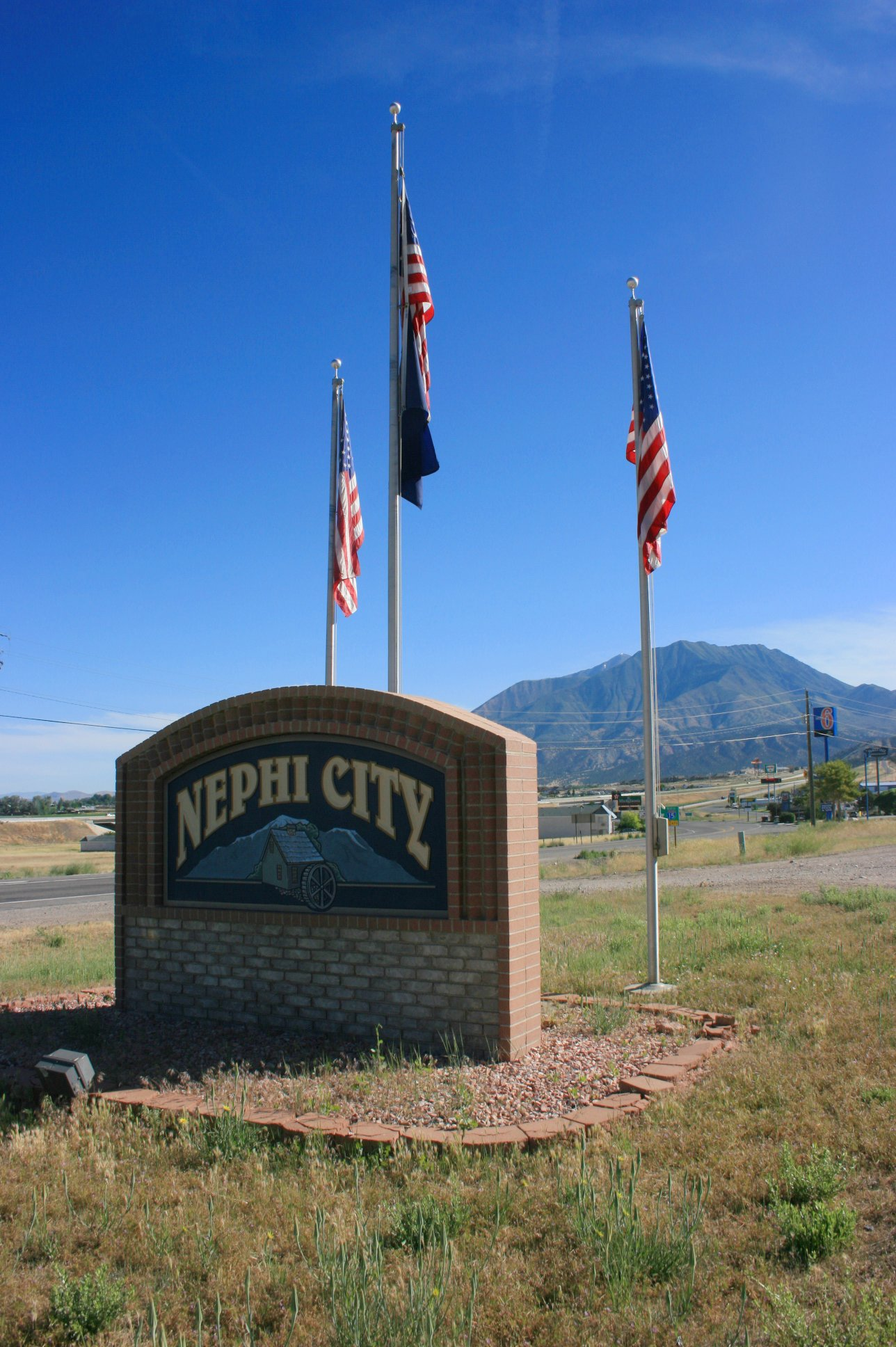
- City sign

- Location in Juab County and state of Utah
- Coordinates: 39°42′33″N 111°49′53″W
- Country: United States
- State: Utah
- County: Juab
- Settled: 1851
- Named for: Nephi

Area
  - Total: 4.75 sq mi (12.31 km^{2})
  - Land: 4.75 sq mi (12.31 km^{2})
  - Water: 0 sq mi (0.00 km^{2})
- Elevation: 5,128 ft (1,563 m)

Population (2020)
  - Total: 6,443
  - Density: 1,356/sq mi (523.4/km^{2})
- Time zone: UTC−7 (Mountain (MST))
  - Summer (DST): UTC−6 (MDT)
- ZIP code: 84648
- Area code: 435
- FIPS code: 49-54220
- GNIS feature ID: 1443793
- Website: nephi.utah.gov

Nephi (/ˈniːfaɪ/ NEE-fy) is a city in and the county seat of Juab County, Utah, United States. It is part of the Provo–Orem metropolitan area. The population was 6,443 at the 2020 census. It was settled by George Washington Bradley and other Mormon pioneers. George Washington Bradley was also commander of the military post at Nephi, Utah, during the Walker War of 1854. Nephi is the principal city in the Juab Valley, an agricultural area. Nephi was named after Nephi, son of Lehi, from the Book of Mormon.

== History ==
Before the area was settled, the site along Salt Creek was first a camping place along the Old Mormon Road to Southern California. Mormon settlers established a settlement at the site in 1851, naming it after the creek. It retained that name until 1882 when the town and its post office became Nephi.

== Demographics ==
Historical population
Census	Pop.	Note	%±
1860	672		—
1870	1,286		91.4%
1880	1,797		39.7%
1890	2,034		13.2%
1900	2,203		8.3%
1910	2,759		25.2%
1920	2,603		−5.7%
1930	2,573		−1.2%
1940	2,835		10.2%
1950	2,990		5.5%
1960	2,566		−14.2%
1970	2,699		5.2%
1980	3,285		21.7%
1990	3,515		7.0%
2000	4,733		34.7%
2010	5,389		13.9%
2020	6,443		19.6%
U.S. Decennial Census

=== 2020 census ===
As of the 2020 census, Nephi had a population of 6,443. The median age was 30.9 years. 32.7% of residents were under the age of 18 and 13.4% of residents were 65 years of age or older. For every 100 females there were 107.2 males, and for every 100 females age 18 and over there were 102.9 males age 18 and over.

98.1% of residents lived in urban areas, while 1.9% lived in rural areas.

There were 2,010 households in Nephi, of which 44.2% had children under the age of 18 living in them. Of all households, 66.8% were married-couple households, 13.7% were households with a male householder and no spouse or partner present, and 16.8% were households with a female householder and no spouse or partner present. About 17.9% of all households were made up of individuals and 9.3% had someone living alone who was 65 years of age or older.

There were 2,135 housing units, of which 5.9% were vacant. The homeowner vacancy rate was 1.2% and the rental vacancy rate was 7.6%.

Racial composition as of the 2020 census
Race	Number	Percent
White	5,947	92.3%
Black or African American	8	0.1%
American Indian and Alaska Native	41	0.6%
Asian	27	0.4%
Native Hawaiian and Other Pacific Islander	29	0.5%
Some other race	104	1.6%
Two or more races	287	4.5%
Hispanic or Latino (of any race)	377	5.9%

=== Income and poverty ===
The median income for a household in the city was $97,348. Males had a median income of $74,743 versus $50,222 for females. The per capita income for the city was $34,229. About 1,672 families (margin of error about 126) were 5.0% below the poverty level (error margin of 3.6%); 607 (±99) of those families had children related to the householder between 5 and 17 years of age and 219 (±99) included householders who were 65 years of age or older.

== Geography ==
Nephi is in eastern Juab County in the Juab Valley, between the Wasatch and San Pitch Mountains to the east and the lower West Hills and Long Ridge to the west. Interstate 15 runs along the eastern edge of the city, with access from Exits 222, 225, and 228. I-15 leads north 31 miles (50 km) to Spanish Fork and south 37 miles (60 km) to Scipio. Utah State Route 28, Nephi's Main Street, runs north 3 miles (5 km) to I-15 and south 41 miles (66 km) to Gunnison. Utah State Route 132 crosses Main Street in the center of town, leading southeast 22 miles (35 km) to Moroni and southwest 28 miles (45 km) to Leamington.

According to the U.S. Census Bureau, Nephi has a total area of 4.6 square miles (11.9 km^{2}), all land.

=== Climate ===
In the Köppen climate classification, Nephi has either a humid subtropical climate (Cfa) or humid continental climate (Dfa) depending on which variant of the system is used.

Climate data for Nephi, Utah (1981–2010)
Month	Jan	Feb	Mar	Apr	May	Jun	Jul	Aug	Sep	Oct	Nov	Dec	Year
Mean daily maximum °F (°C)	39.6 (4.2)	44.6 (7.0)	55.6 (13.1)	64.0 (17.8)	73.6 (23.1)	83.9 (28.8)	91.8 (33.2)	89.8 (32.1)	80.5 (26.9)	66.8 (19.3)	51.4 (10.8)	39.5 (4.2)	65.1 (18.4)
Mean daily minimum °F (°C)	18.2 (−7.7)	21.5 (−5.8)	28.5 (−1.9)	34.3 (1.3)	42.3 (5.7)	50.1 (10.1)	58.7 (14.8)	57.5 (14.2)	48.1 (8.9)	36.9 (2.7)	26.9 (−2.8)	18.5 (−7.5)	36.8 (2.7)
Average precipitation inches (mm)	1.31 (33)	1.32 (34)	1.61 (41)	1.66 (42)	1.61 (41)	0.98 (25)	0.75 (19)	0.90 (23)	1.19 (30)	1.57 (40)	1.24 (31)	1.30 (33)	15.46 (393)
Average snowfall inches (cm)	12.2 (31)	10.4 (26)	6.6 (17)	2.7 (6.9)	0.4 (1.0)	0.0 (0.0)	0.0 (0.0)	0.0 (0.0)	0.0 (0.0)	1.2 (3.0)	6.9 (18)	12.9 (33)	53.4 (136)
Source: NOAA

== Education ==
It is in the Juab School District.

== Notable people ==
- Roger Boisjoly, engineer who tried to prevent Space Shuttle Challenger from launching, lived his final years in Nephi.
- Brandon Flowers of The Killers lived in Nephi from age 8 until his junior year in Juab High School. The Killers' 2021 album Pressure Machine is a concept album inspired by Flowers' childhood in Nephi, and features spoken word interviews with town residents.
- Alfred McCune, railroad builder and mine operator, moved to Nephi.

== See also ==
- List of municipalities in Utah
