= Roe A. and Louise R. Deal House =

Historic house in Utah, United States

- U.S. National Register of Historic Places
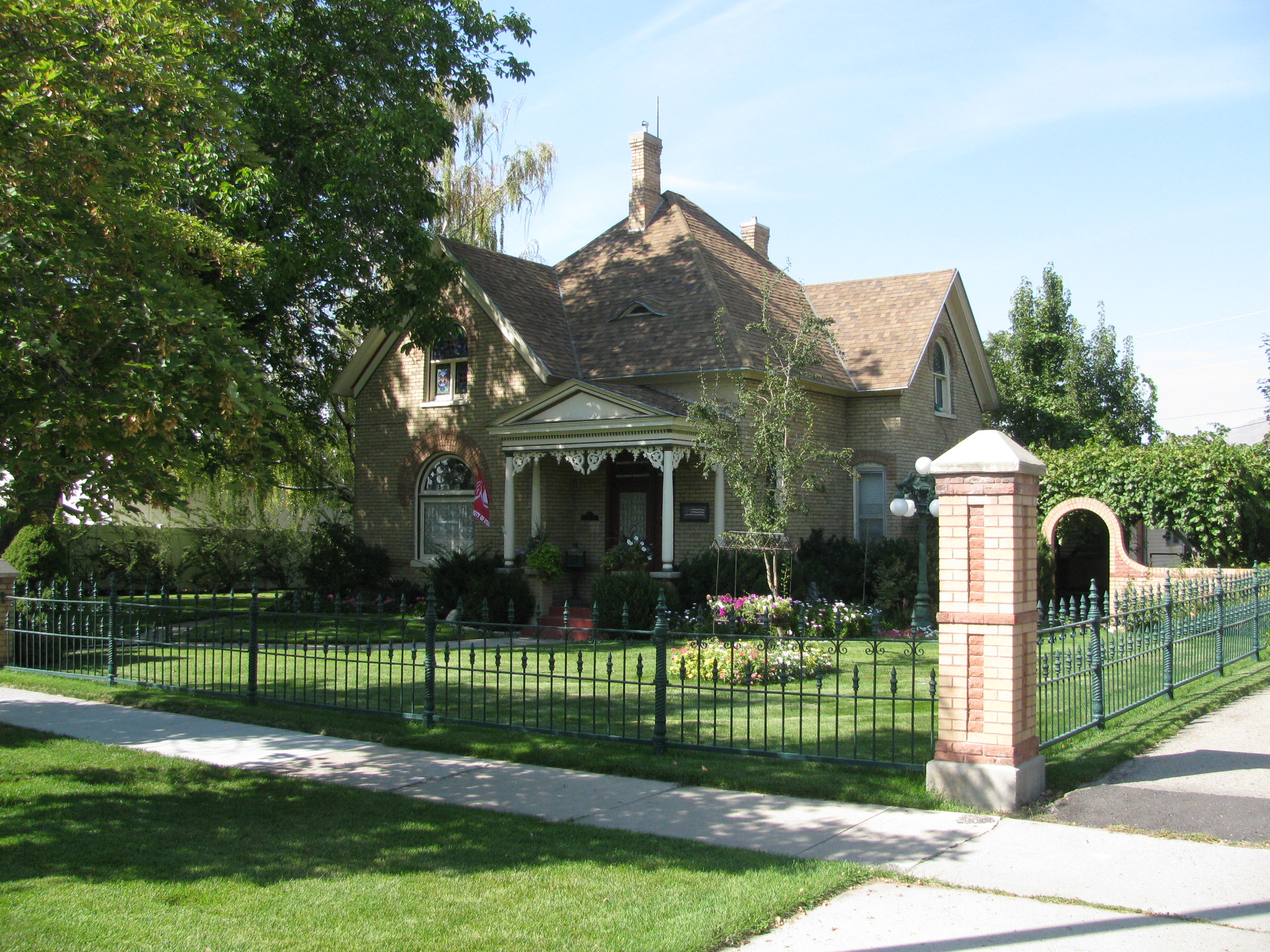

- Location within Utah Location within the United States
- Location: 39 E 200 N, Springville, Utah
- Coordinates: 40°9′52.1″N 111°36′33.64″W
- Area: 0.5 acres (0.20 ha)
- Built: 1900
- Architectural style: Late Victorian
- MPS: Springville MPS
- NRHP reference No.: 97001568
- Added to NRHP: January 5, 1998

The Roe A. and Louise R. Deal House is an historic house in Springville, Utah, United States. The house was added to the U.S. National Register of Historic Places in 1998. Along with eleven other properties, the Deal House was nominated to the National Register via the Springville Multiple Property Submission.

The NRHP nomination for the house argues that it "is significant in the broad patterns of Springville history as an example of the larger, more substantially constructed homes built during the late nineteenth and early twentieth centuries", and that it demonstrates the development in Springville of awareness of popular architectural styles elsewhere.
