= Nephi and Annie Kindred House =

Historic house in Utah, United States

- U.S. National Register of Historic Places
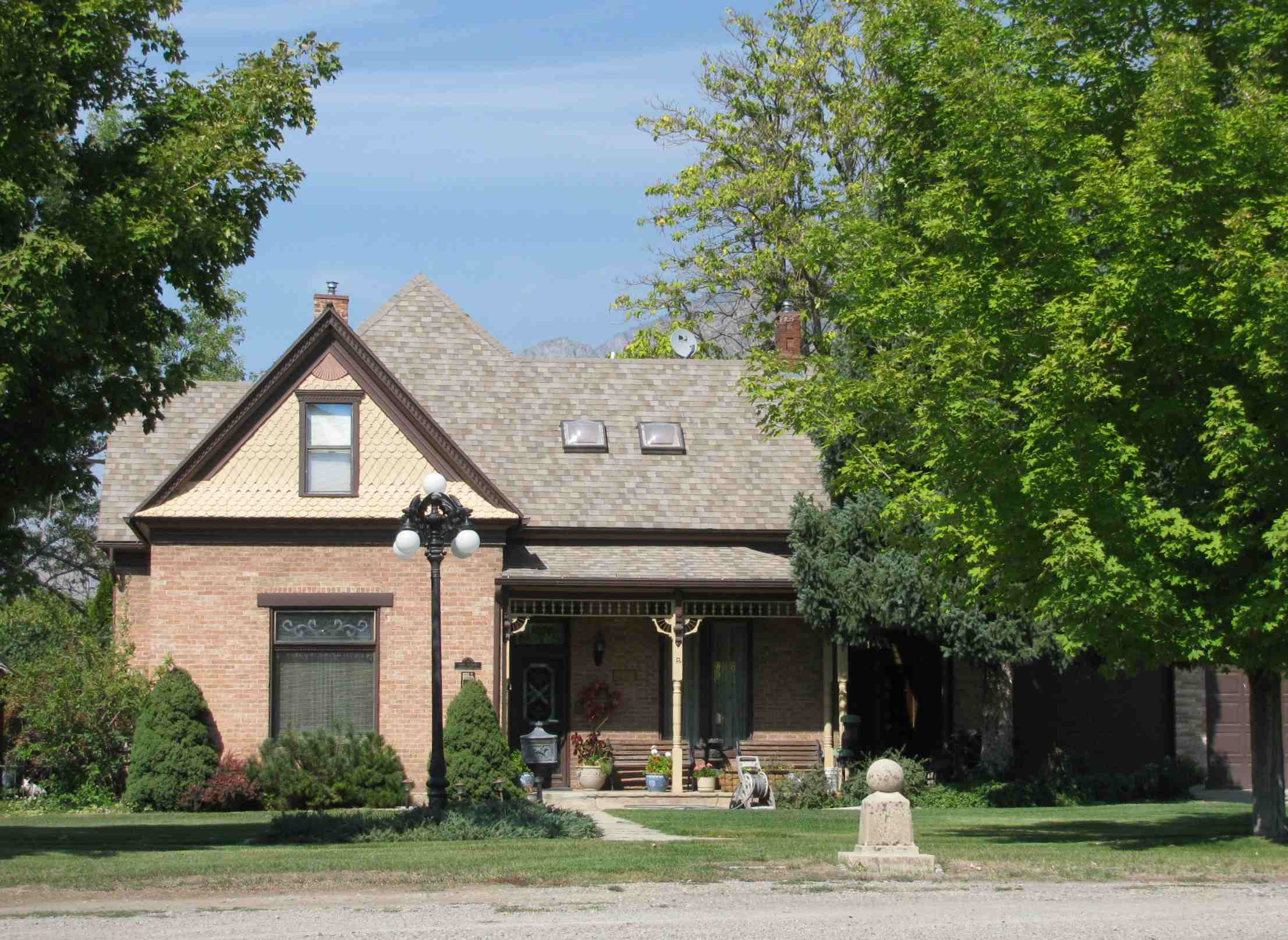

- Location within Utah Location within the United States
- Location: 188 W Center, Springville, Utah
- Coordinates: 40°10′1″N 111°36′46″W
- Area: 0.3 acres (0.12 ha)
- Built: 1896
- Built by: Berkley, Andrew; Richardson, Reuban
- Architectural style: Queen Anne
- MPS: Springville MPS
- NRHP reference No.: 97001573
- Added to NRHP: January 5, 1998

The Nephi and Annie Kindred House in 188 W Center in Springville, Utah was built in 1896. It was listed on the National Register of Historic Places in 1998.

It shows eclectic use of Victorian architecture styles.

It was built by Andrew Berkley, a mason, and Reuben Richardson, a carpenter.
