= The Hill Climber =

Artwork by Jeff Decker

The Hillclimber
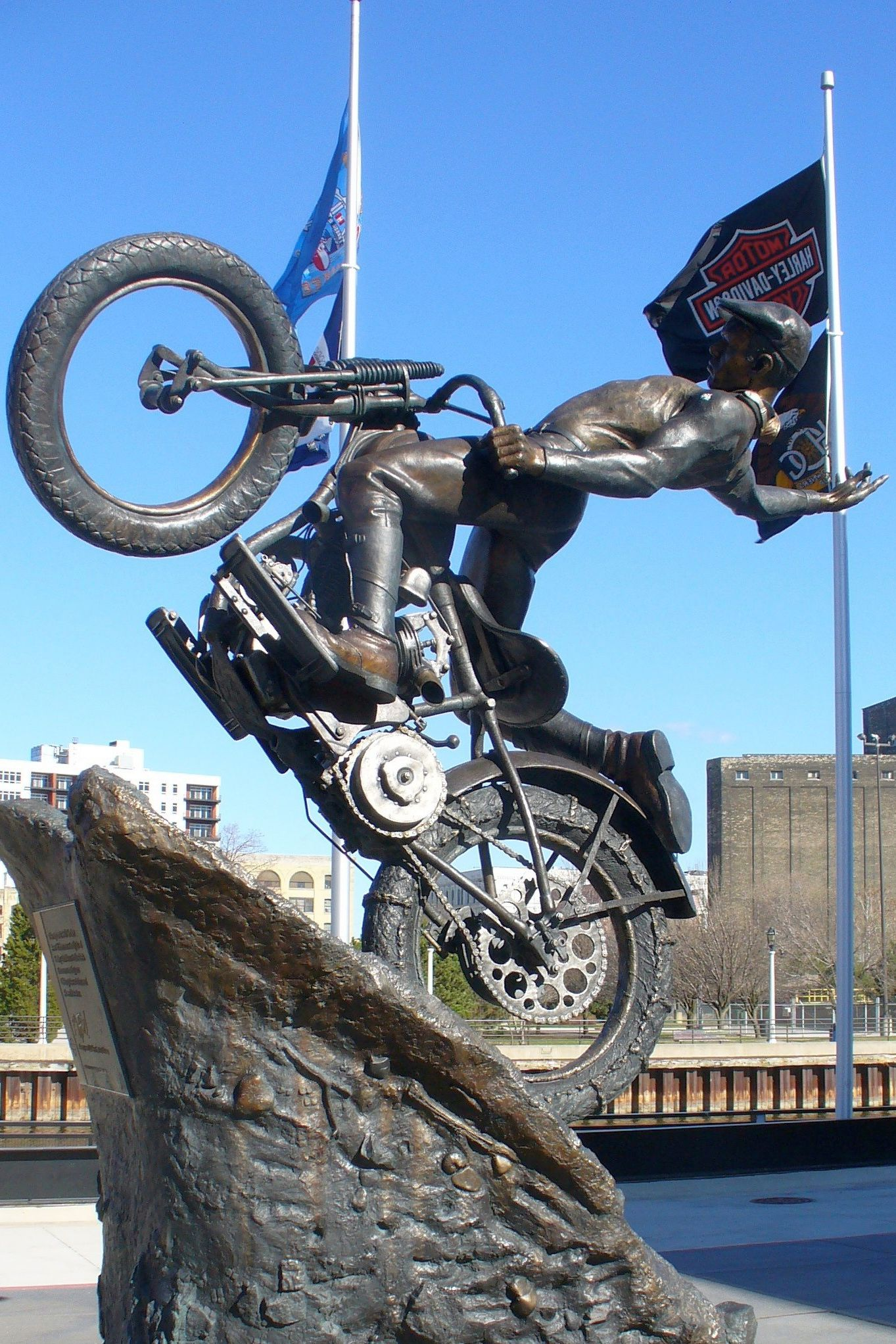
- Artist: Jeff Decker
- Year: June 2008
- Dimensions: 4.9 m (16 ft)
- Location: Harley-Davidson Museum; Milwaukee, Wisconsin, U.S.; 43°01′52.66″N 87°54′56.56″W
- Owner: Harley-Davidson Museum

The Hillclimber is a public artwork by American artist Jeff Decker, located on the grounds of the Harley-Davidson Museum in Milwaukee, Wisconsin, United States.

== Description ==
The Hillclimber is a 5,000 pound bronze welded sculpture that stands 16 feet tall and was created by Jeff Decker. Decker is a Utah-based artist, historian and Harley enthusiast. This sculpture is an enlarged life and 1/2 size of his original called, By the Horns; a sculpture referencing the similarities of bull riding and the sport hill climbing. This was a somewhat collaborative piece done with painter David Uhl, another artist licensed by Harley-Davidson. The rider is shown participating in a sport called hillclimbing, popular in the 1920s and 30s. The figure is free of fear in his eyes as one foot is being swept off the bike and his right arm extends backwards."He is crashing," Decker said of the helmet less young rider. "But every hillclimber crashes. It's part of the race." Hillclimbers were known to race up hills nicknamed the “widow maker” because of the danger and high rate of injury involved in this sport. The sculpture portrays a vintage Harley rider frozen in a skyward wheelie on a DAH bike, one of only six in the world. A documentation to the artist's friendship with Willie and Nancy Davidson can be seen on the gear drive that is inscribed with "Willie G."

== Historical information ==
This sculpture can be found on the Founders Terrace of the Harley-Davidson Museum in Milwaukee, Wisconsin. The sculpture is located on the most visible part of the museum's site. The piece was a gift from the family of Willie G. Davidson, a senior vice president and chief styling officer at Harley who is the grandson of one of the company founders, William A. Davidson. Willie and Nancy Davidson saw the original By the Horns sculpture and commissioned an enlarged duplicate to donate to the Harley-Davidson Museum.
