= Merit Academy =

Merit Preparatory Academy
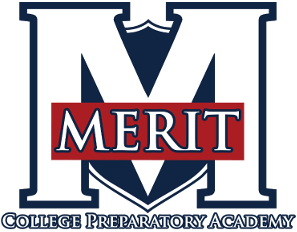
- Logo of Merit Preparatory Academy (Created in 2014)

Location
- 1440 West Center Street; Springville, Utah 84663; 40°10′03″N 111°38′09″W

Information
- Type: Public, charter
- Established: c. 2008; 17 years old
- Authorizer: Utah State Charter School Board
- Director: Kristi Gilbert
- Grades: 7–12
- Enrollment: 493 (2023–2024)
- Colors: Navy, maroon, silver
- Mascot: Knight
- Website: www.meritacademy.org

Merit Preparatory Academy (MPA) is a charter high school located in Springville, Utah, U.S., established in 2008, it serves students grades 7-12.

== Facilities ==
The school building is a 63,000-square-foot (5,900 m^{2}) facility on approximately 12 acres (49,000 m^{2}) of grounds. It has features such as classrooms, foreign language labs, a gymnatorium (gym/auditorium), an art classroom, a dance studio, music rooms, a kitchen, a cafeteria, and both indoor and outdoor sports facilities.

== Instructional Focus Tracks ==
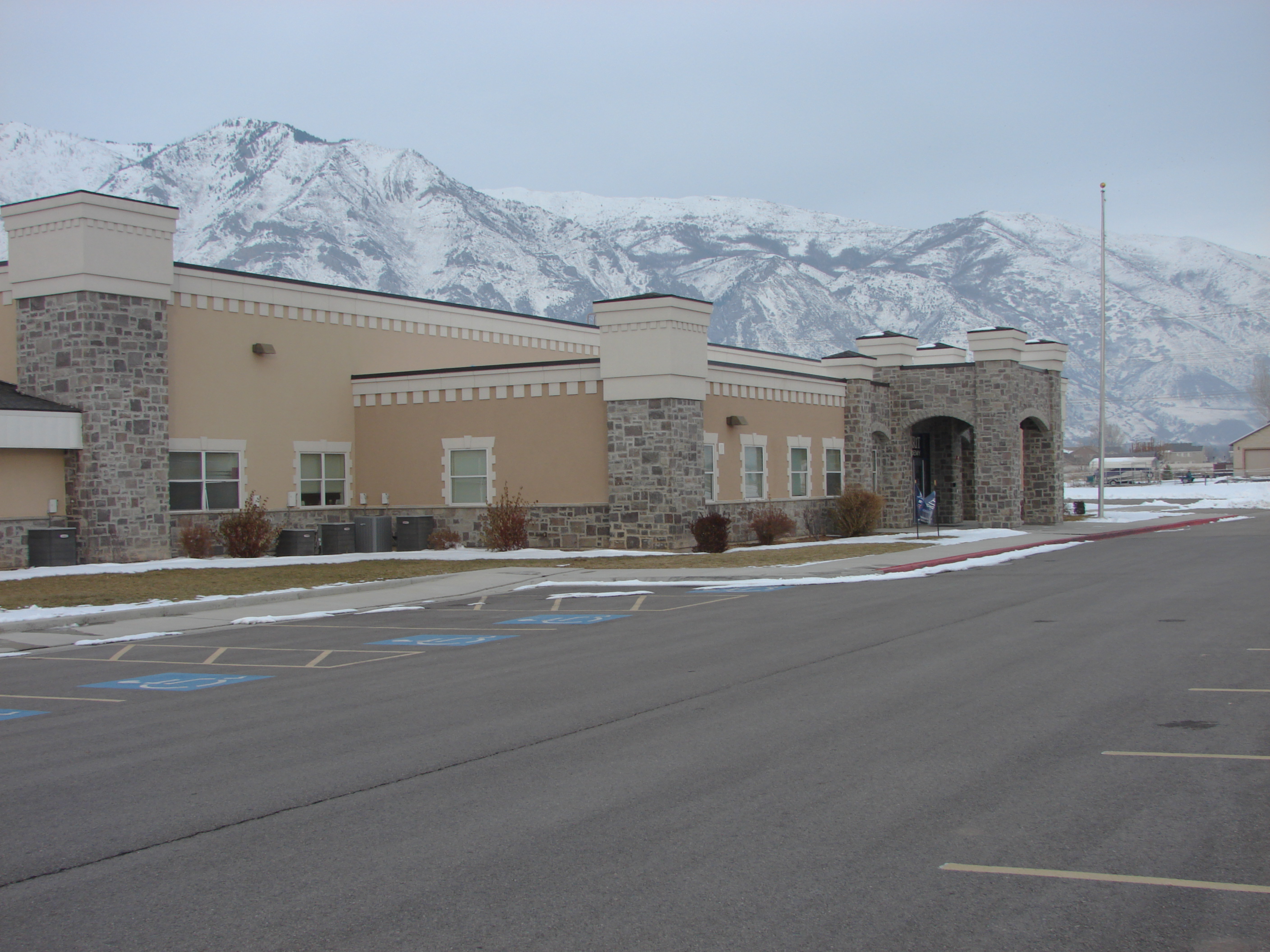
Looking northeast at Merit Academy in Springville, Utah, January 2016

Instructional Focus Tracks (IFTs):

- Concurrent Enrollment (College Credit)
- Business
- Science & Engineering
- Science & Mathematics
- Computers & Technology
- English & Humanities
- Foreign Languages
- Fine Arts
- General Studies
- Individualized Focus
