= Jeff Decker =

American sculptor

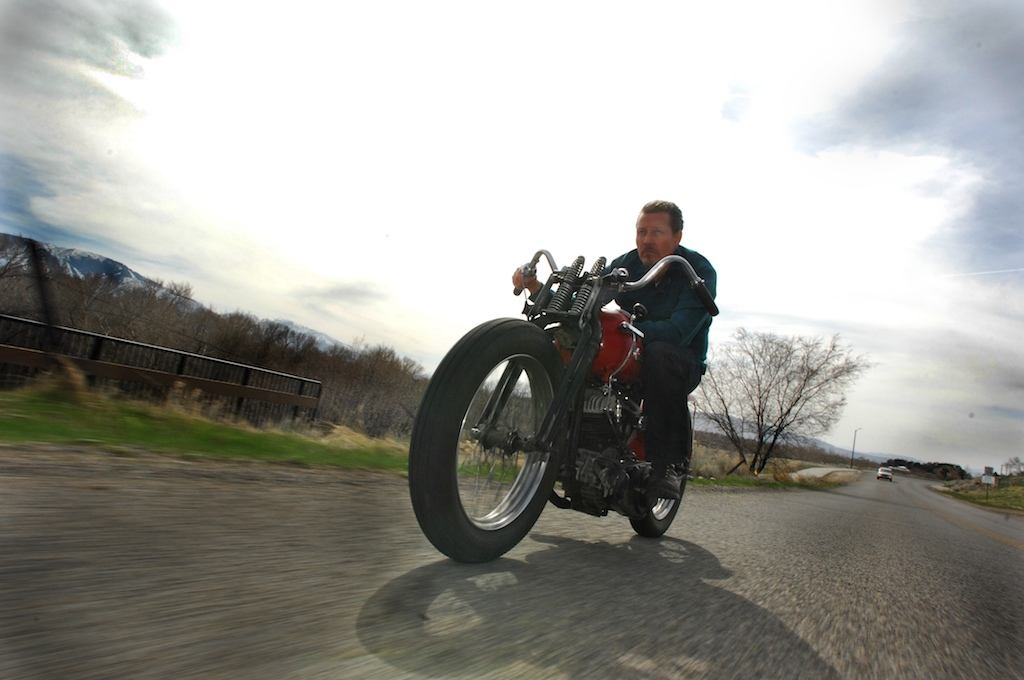
- Jeff Decker
- Born: June 14, 1966 (age 60); Torrance, California
- Education: Brigham Young University
- Occupation: Sculptor
- Known for: Bronze sculptures, The Hill Climber
- Spouse: Kelly Lei Decker
- Website: jeffdeckerstudio.com

Jeff Decker is a sculptor and historian who is known for his bronze sculptures, the most notable of which is titled "By the Horns" (also known as The Hill Climber), a 16-foot-tall, 5,000-pound bronze located on the grounds of the Harley-Davidson Museum. His bronze-cast sculptures depicting the synergy of man and modern machines, particularly historic motorcycles, is known in both the motorcycling community and the world of fine art. As of 2009, Decker was Harley-Davidson's official sculptor.

== Professional background ==
Decker is the son of Allen and Lana Decker. Steeped in the southern California car culture of the 1960s, Decker learned the ways of his father. An intense collector, Decker's father owned one of the area's largest flathead speed equipment collections.

Working full-time at a bronze casting foundry, Decker's first idea was to capture Man's quest for speed in all vehicles. His first sculpture was a 1924 Miller Indy car. Next came the Baby Bootlegger, a 1922 world record-holding speedboat.

On display at Bob Dron Harley-Davidson located in Oakland, California, Decker created a life-size bronze statue from a famous photograph of Joe Petrali showing him astride a Harley Streamliner, taken during Petrali's historic 136 mile per hour record setting run at Daytona on March 13, 1937. and is the only bronze sculpture artist licensed by Harley-Davidson to replicate their products. Decker also created a five-foot-tall, about 1,000-pound bronze of Elvis with a Harley-Davidson motorcycle he owned, a 1956 KHK model.

== Bronze Sculptures ==
Name	Year	Size	Weight
The 1924 Miller 91 Indy Car	1994	26″ × 12″ × 12″	60 pounds
The Baby Bootlegger	1995	42″ × 12″ × 8″	60 pounds
The Flying Merkel	1997	22″ × 13″ × 8″	55 pounds
Jim Davis Trophy Bust	1998	18″ × 6″ × 6″	20 pounds
The 1915 Cyclone	1998	22″ × 13″ × 8″	55 pounds
Flat Out at Bonneville	1999	42″ × 12″ × 32″	300 pounds
Tilt & Turns	1999	24" x 24" x 12"	75 pounds
The 1916 Big Valve Excelsior	2000	22″ × 13″ × 8″	55 pounds
The 1912 Indian Big Base 8 valve racer	2000	22″ × 13″ × 8″	55 pounds
The 1916 8 Valve Harley-Davidson works racer	2000	22″ × 13″ × 8″	55 pounds
Neck and neck with Death	2000	7’ x 2’ x 2’	300 pounds
The Bullet 1/2 scale	2001	44″ × 28″ × 28″	300 pounds
The Bullet 1/4 scale	2002	22″ × 14″ × 14″	50 pounds
Slant Artist	2003	18″ × 14″ × 28″	20 pounds
Petrali	2003	7′ × 2′ × 4′	800 pounds
Petrali/Marquette-size	2004	18″ × 8″ × 10″	25 pounds
Harley-Davidson's 1000+4	2004	18″ × 8″ × 12″	20 pounds
Ruby	2005	18″ × 8″ × 12″	25 pounds
Daytona	2006	28″ × 22″ × 13″	60 pounds
West Was Won	2007	36″ × 20″ × 18″	110 pounds
The King and his Ride	2007	18″ × 8″ × 12″	30 pounds
By the Horns (The Hill Climber)	2008	9′ × 5′ × 18′	5 tons
