= Springville, Utah =

City in Utah, United States

Springville
- City
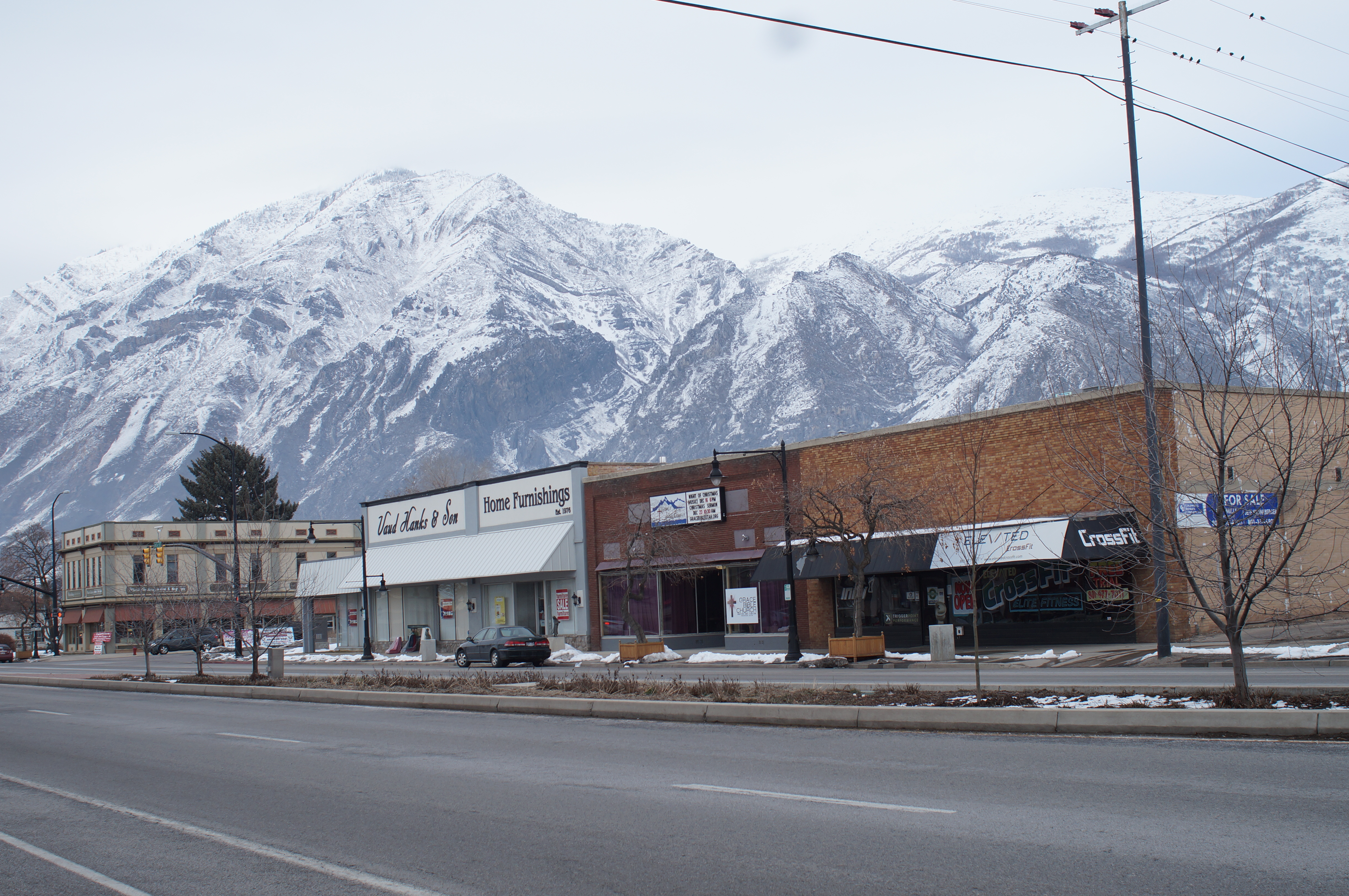
- Main Street with the snowy Wasatch Mountains in the background
- Nickname: Art City
- Location in Utah County and the state of Utah
- Coordinates: 40°09′56″N 111°38′18″W
- Country: United States
- State: Utah
- County: Utah
- Settled: September 18, 1850
- Incorporated: April 4, 1853
- Named for: a local spring

Area
  - Total: 14.39 sq mi (37.28 km^{2})
  - Land: 14.34 sq mi (37.15 km^{2})
  - Water: 0.050 sq mi (0.13 km^{2})
- Elevation: 4,554 ft (1,388 m)

Population (2020)
  - Total: 35,268
  - Density: 2,458.8/sq mi (949.34/km^{2})
- Time zone: UTC−7 (Mountain (MST))
  - Summer (DST): UTC−6 (MDT)
- ZIP code: 84663
- Area codes: 385, 801
- FIPS code: 49-72280
- GNIS feature ID: 2411963
- Website: www.springvilleutah.gov

Springville is a city in Utah County, Utah, United States, that is part of the Provo–Orem metropolitan area. The population was 35,268 in 2020, according to the United States Census. Springville is a bedroom community for commuters who work in the Provo-Orem and Salt Lake City metropolitan areas. Other neighboring cities include Spanish Fork and Mapleton. Springville has the nickname of "Art City" or "Hobble Creek".

== History ==
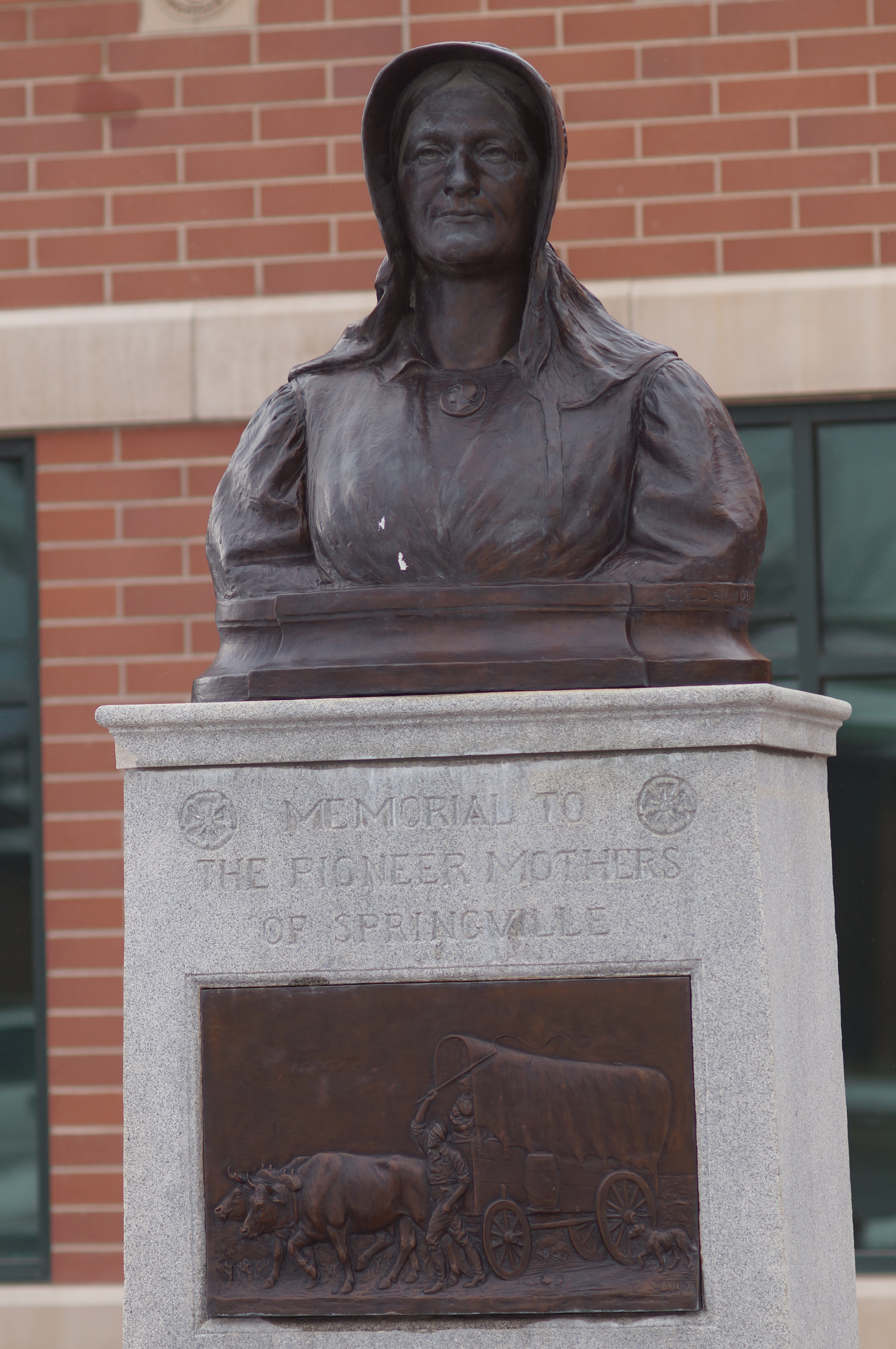
Memorial to Springville, Utah's pioneer mothers. It was unveiled in 1932 by sculptor Cyrus Dallin, who was born in Springville in 1861.

The first European explorer of what is now Springville was Father Silvestre Vélez de Escalante, a Franciscan padre, in 1776. What became Springville lay along the wagon route called the Mormon Road that Mormon pioneers and 49ers traveled through southern Utah, northern Arizona, southern Nevada and Southern California. From 1855, each winter trains of freight wagons traveled on this road across the deserts between Los Angeles and Salt Lake City until the late 1860s when the railroad arrived in Utah. During the year 1849, a group of pioneers led by William Miller and James Mendenhall traveled to the Provo River area. Mendenhall and Miller explored a little further south and fell in love with what is now known as the Hobble Creek area. Springville was settled in 1850 by eight pioneer families, led by Aaron Johnson, who crossed the plains to Salt Lake Valley from the East and were directed by Brigham Young to settle 50 miles (80 km) further south.

Incorporated in February 1853, the pioneers called the city Hobble Creek because an early exploration team led by Oliver B. Huntington in February 1849 had a horse lose a pair of iron hobbles (restraints tied to the horse's forelegs) while the team was camped next to the creek. As the town grew, the name was changed to Springville, after the Fort Springville. Fort Springville was named after the many freshwater springs in the area, particularly near the fort. The original name was not completely lost, however, as the canyon stream (and associated canyons), a local elementary school, and city-owned golf course have retained the name Hobble Creek.

Springville is known as "Art City" due to its strong development of the arts. Springville is home to the Springville Museum of Art, Utah's oldest museum for the visual fine arts (circa 1937). The museum, housed in a historic Spanish Colonial Revival-style building, showcases collections of many well-known artists, both local and national, including collections of Utah art, a major Soviet collection, early Americana, and the European Steed collection. It was dedicated by David O. McKay as a "sanctuary of beauty and a temple of meditation." Springville is the birthplace of noted sculptor Cyrus Dallin. The main street is dotted with bronze statues, including several from local sculptors Gary Price and Jeff Decker.

Springville is a thriving community which has experienced steady growth over the past ten years. The current population is projected to grow to more than 50,000 over the next ten years, in line with the expected future expansion of its commercial, office, retail, and industrial sectors along the city's I-15 corridor.

== Geography ==
According to the United States Census Bureau, the city has an area of 14.4 square miles (37.4 km^{2}), of which 14.4 square miles (37.2 km^{2}) is land and 0.04 square miles (0.1 km^{2}), or 0.34%, is water.

Springville is on the west side of the Wasatch Mountain Range and 3 miles (5 km) east of the average shoreline of Utah Lake and almost entirely east of Interstate 15. All vehicular traffic that transports goods to the north, south, east and west funnels through the interstate hub near Springville's freeway location. With its connection to the arts, Springville is a community that has experienced steady growth over the past ten years. Its current population of 31,205 continues to increase with 4.6% annual growth.

== Demographics ==
Historical population
Census	Pop.	Note	%±
1860	1,357		—
1870	1,661		22.4%
1880	2,312		39.2%
1890	2,849		23.2%
1900	4,322		51.7%
1910	3,356		−22.4%
1920	3,010		−10.3%
1930	3,748		24.5%
1940	4,796		28.0%
1950	6,475		35.0%
1960	7,913		22.2%
1970	8,790		11.1%
1980	12,101		37.7%
1990	13,950		15.3%
2000	20,424		46.4%
2010	29,466		44.3%
2020	35,268		19.7%
U.S. Decennial Census

=== 2020 census ===
As of the 2020 census, Springville had a population of 35,268. The median age was 28.5 years. 33.9% of residents were under the age of 18 and 10.1% of residents were 65 years of age or older. For every 100 females there were 99.7 males, and for every 100 females age 18 and over there were 97.3 males age 18 and over.

99.6% of residents lived in urban areas, while 0.4% lived in rural areas.

There were 10,418 households in Springville, of which 48.2% had children under the age of 18 living in them. Of all households, 66.8% were married-couple households, 11.7% were households with a male householder and no spouse or partner present, and 18.2% were households with a female householder and no spouse or partner present. About 15.1% of all households were made up of individuals and 6.8% had someone living alone who was 65 years of age or older.

There were 10,704 housing units, of which 2.7% were vacant. The homeowner vacancy rate was 0.5% and the rental vacancy rate was 2.9%.

Racial composition as of the 2020 census
Race	Number	Percent
White	28,378	80.5%
Black or African American	212	0.6%
American Indian and Alaska Native	335	0.9%
Asian	294	0.8%
Native Hawaiian and Other Pacific Islander	334	0.9%
Some other race	2,447	6.9%
Two or more races	3,268	9.3%
Hispanic or Latino (of any race)	5,717	16.2%

=== 2010 census ===
As of the 2010 census, the population had grown to 29,466.

=== 2000 census ===
As of the 2000 census, there were 20,424 people, 5,975 households, and 5,024 families residing in the city. The population density was 1,770.5 people per square mile (683.6 people/km^{2}). There were 6,229 housing units at an average density of 540.0 units per square mile (208.5 units/km^{2}). The city's racial makeup was 94.58% White, 0.11% African American, 0.62% Native American, 0.35% Asian, 0.28% Pacific Islander, 2.23% from other races, and 1.83% from two or more races. Hispanic or Latino of any race were 4.77% of the population.

There were 5,975 households, of which 51.5% had children under the age of 18 living with them, 72.4% were married couples living together, 8.7% had a female householder with no husband present, and 15.9% were non-families. 13.2% of all households were made up of individuals, and 5.8% had someone living alone who was 65 years of age or older. The average household size was 3.41 and the average family size was 3.76.

In the city, the population was spread out, with 37.4% under the age of 18, 12.7% from 18 to 24, 28.0% from 25 to 44, 14.0% from 45 to 64, and 7.9% who were 65 years of age or older. The median age was 25 years. The heavily weighted 18- to 24-year-old demographic is largely due to the city slowly attracting students and graduates from Brigham Young University, in the adjoining city of Provo, as well as Utah Valley University in the nearby city of Orem. For every 100 females, there are 98.5 males. For every 100 females age 18 and over, there were 94.9 males.

The city's median household income was $46,472, and the median family income was $48,845. Males had a median income of $37,942 versus $26,098 for females. The city's per capita income was $15,634. About 6.6% of families and 8.0% of the population were below the poverty line, including 10.1% of those under age 18 and 4.0% of those age 65 or over.

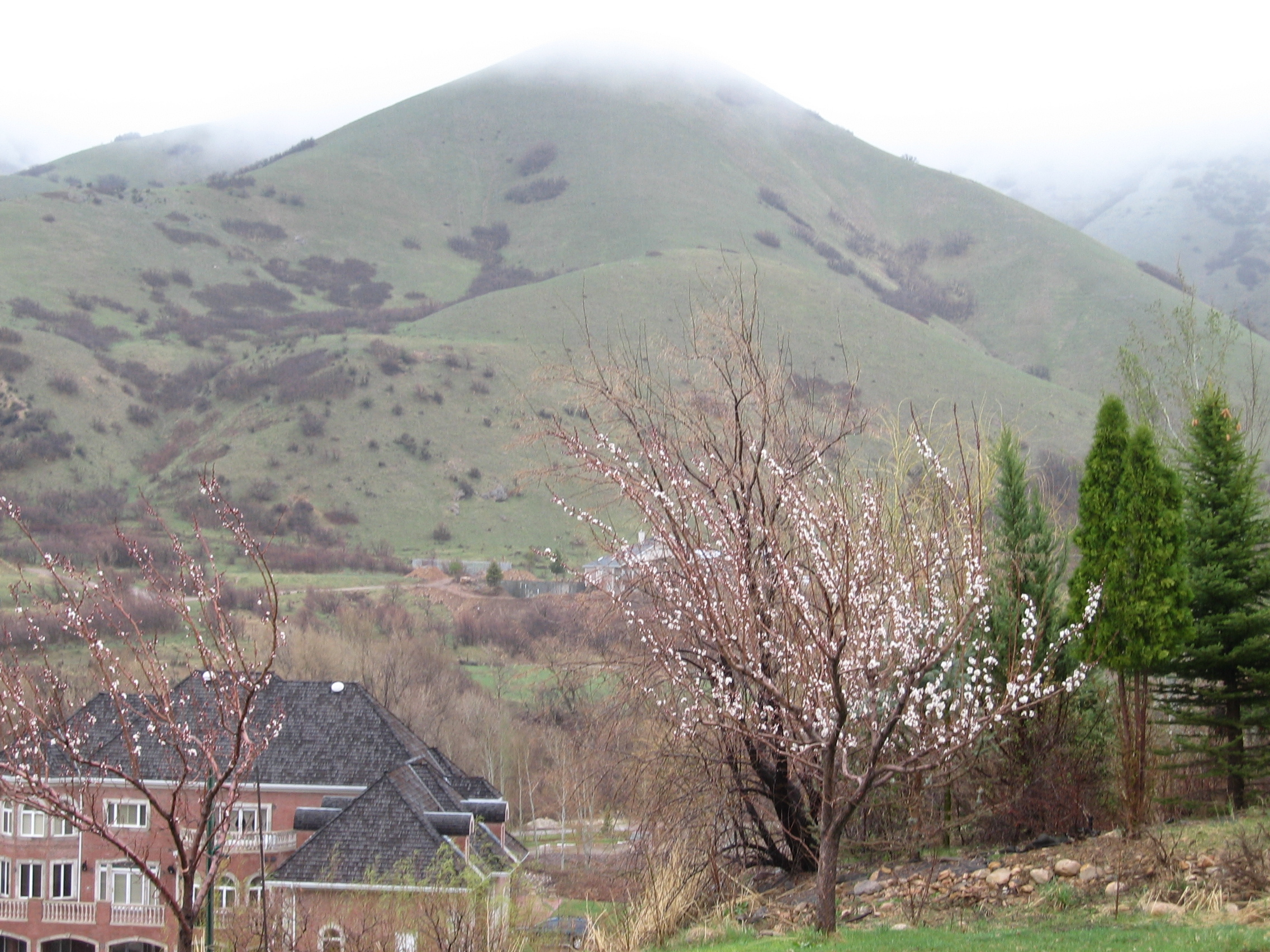
Mountains to the east of Springville, part of the Wasatch Range

== Local events ==
Art City Days, held each year in early June, is one of the first city celebrations of the summer season in Utah Valley. Residents join in a variety of activities to celebrate their community, its history, and the warmer weather. Activities include a parade, carnival, hot air balloons, contests, sporting events, and fireworks.

Springville is also home to the Springville World Folkfest, a week-long celebration of folk dance and music held every July at the outdoor amphitheater in the Spring Acres Arts Park. Folk dance groups travel from around the world to participate in this festival. Folkfest performers are housed by host families in the Springville area.

Every May, Springville hosts the annual Indian Festival of Utah also in Spring Acres Arts Park, the state's only cultural event devoted to East Indian, Pakistani, and South Asian communities across the Salt Lake City metropolitan area. Formerly held in nearby Spanish Fork, it represents the small but thriving Indian American and South Asian American communities of northern Utah.

== Library ==
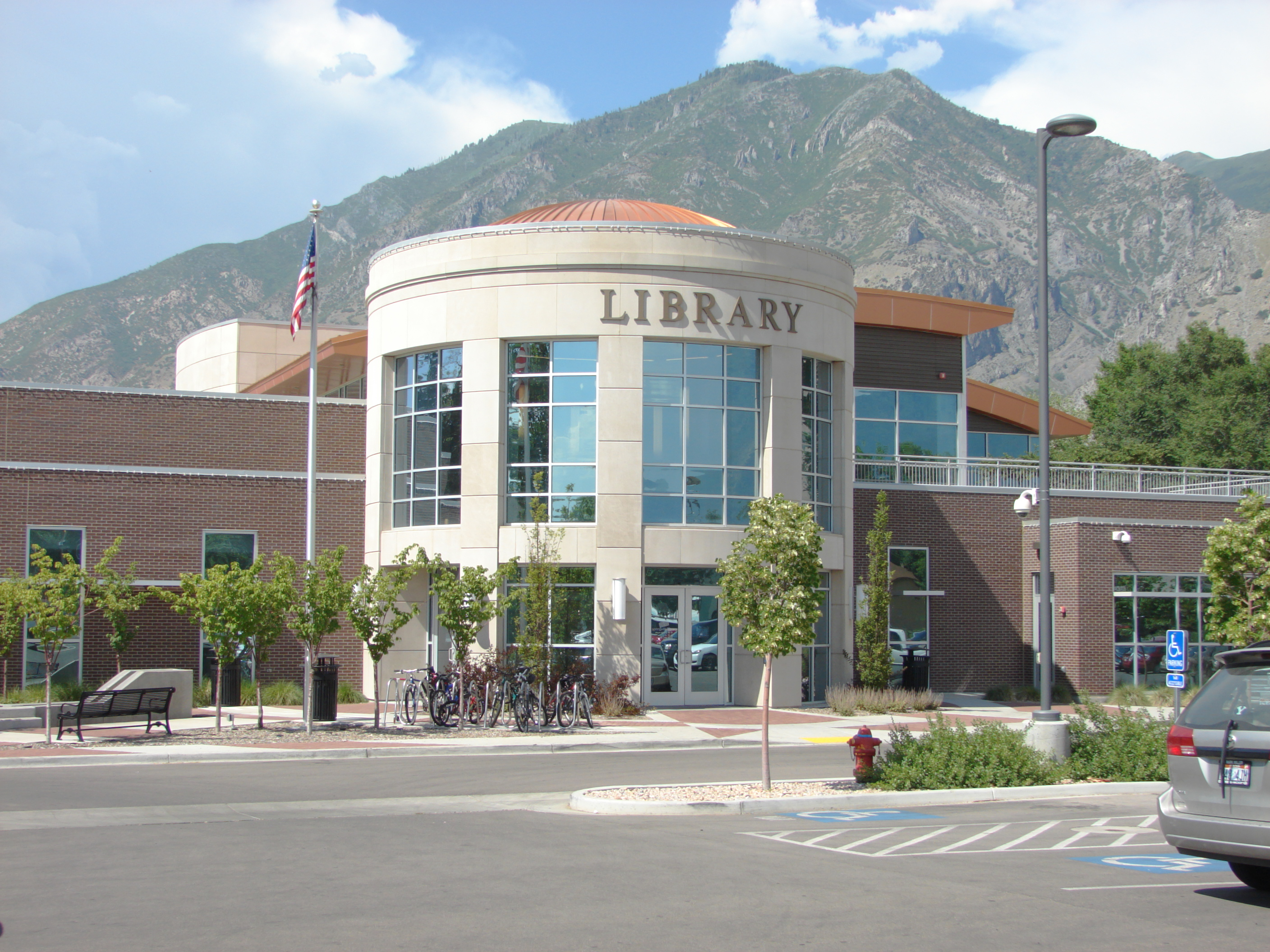
Springville Public Library with view of Wasatch Range in background

With Springville growing at such a fast rate, the need for a new library soon arose. The old library, the Springville Carnegie Library, could not fit the needs of the rapidly growing city. From 1965 to 2008, the library was housed in the north wing of the Springville Office Building of the time. The old building became the home of the Daughters of Utah Pioneers Museum and the Springville Historical Society. Construction began on the current library in 2008 and was finished in 2011. Along with having over one million books, movies, and playaways, the new library hosts events, classes, and children's programs.

== Education ==
Springville is served by Nebo School District. Public schools in this district within Springville include Springville High School, Springville Junior High School, Spring Canyon Middle School, Art City Elementary, Brookside Elementary, Cherry Creek Elementary, Sage Creek Elementary, Meadow Brook Elementary, and Westside Elementary. Reagan Academy and Merit Academy, both charter schools, are also in Springville.

In 2020, Springville opened the Utah Schools for the Deaf and the Blind's third campus, which was named after Elizabeth DeLong, a leader among Utah's deaf community in the early 20th century.

== Climate ==
Under the Köppen climate classification, Springville has a humid subtropical climate (Cfa) or a humid continental climate (Dfa) depending on which variant of the system is used.

Climate data for Springville, Utah
Month	Jan	Feb	Mar	Apr	May	Jun	Jul	Aug	Sep	Oct	Nov	Dec	Year
Mean daily maximum °F (°C)	40 (4)	46 (8)	57 (14)	65 (18)	75 (24)	85 (29)	94 (34)	92 (33)	82 (28)	67 (19)	52 (11)	40 (4)	66 (19)
Mean daily minimum °F (°C)	22 (−6)	26 (−3)	33 (1)	39 (4)	47 (8)	54 (12)	61 (16)	60 (16)	51 (11)	40 (4)	31 (−1)	24 (−4)	41 (5)
Average precipitation inches (mm)	1.9 (48)	1.9 (48)	1.9 (48)	2.0 (51)	2.1 (53)	1.2 (30)	0.8 (20)	1.0 (25)	1.4 (36)	2.0 (51)	1.7 (43)	1.9 (48)	19.8 (501)
Source: weather.com

== Photos ==
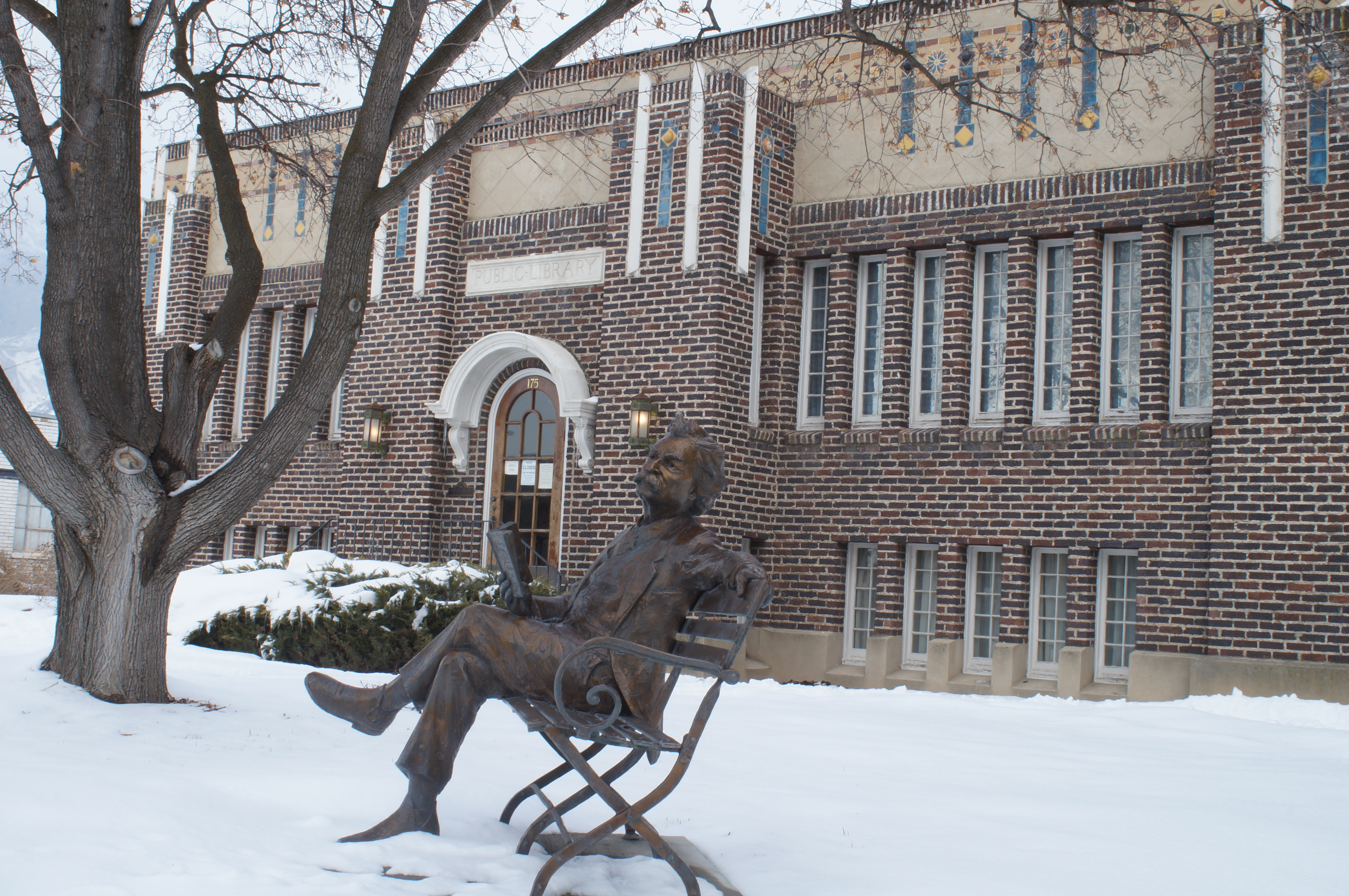
This building functioned as the Springville, Utah public library from 1922 to 1965, when the library was moved to a newer building. A sculpture of Mark Twain reading a book now adorns the lawn.

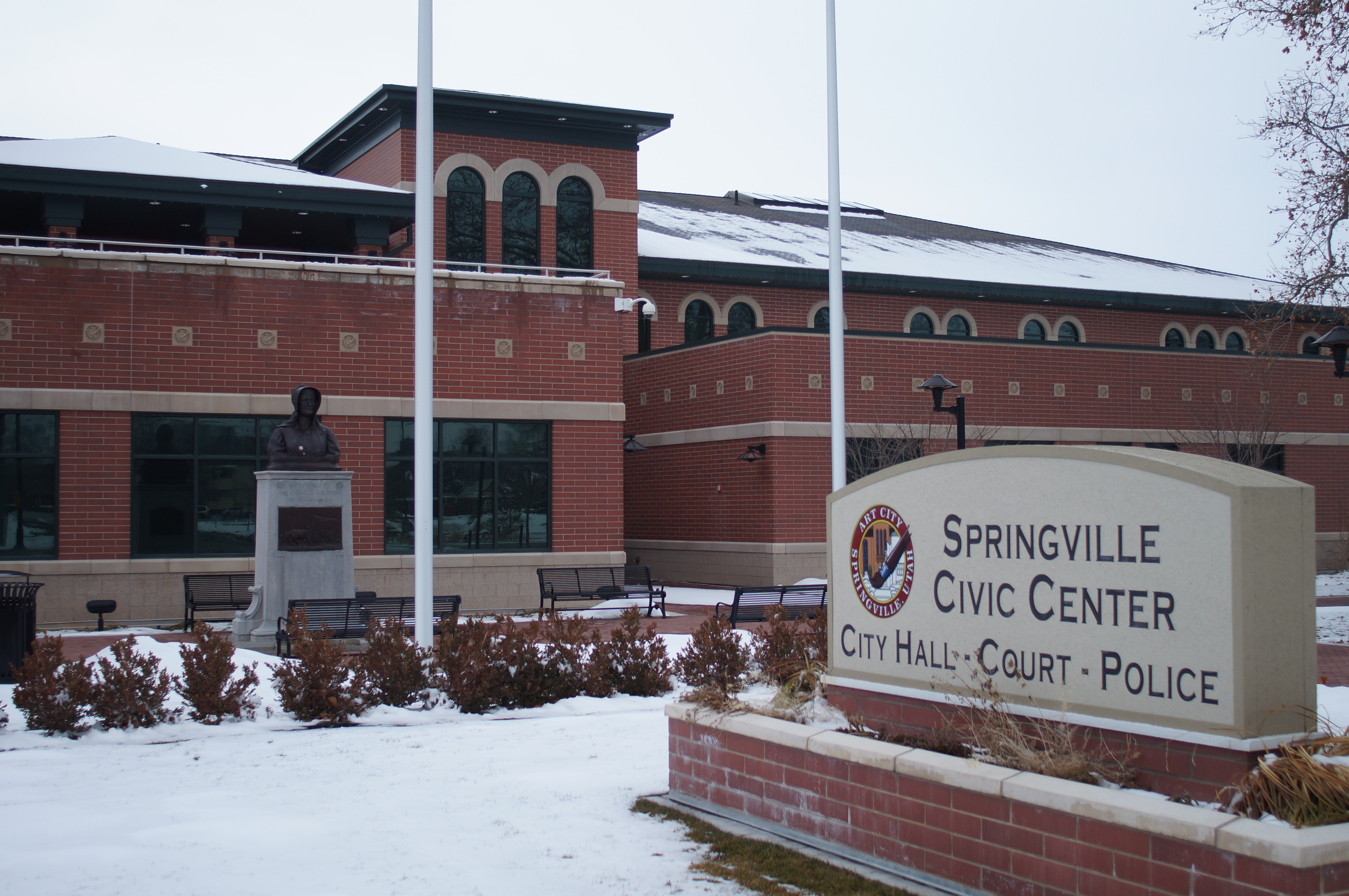
The Springville, Utah Civic Center building with Dallin Pioneer Mother Memorial. The Dallin sculpture was moved from its nearby park site when the new Civic Center Building was erected.

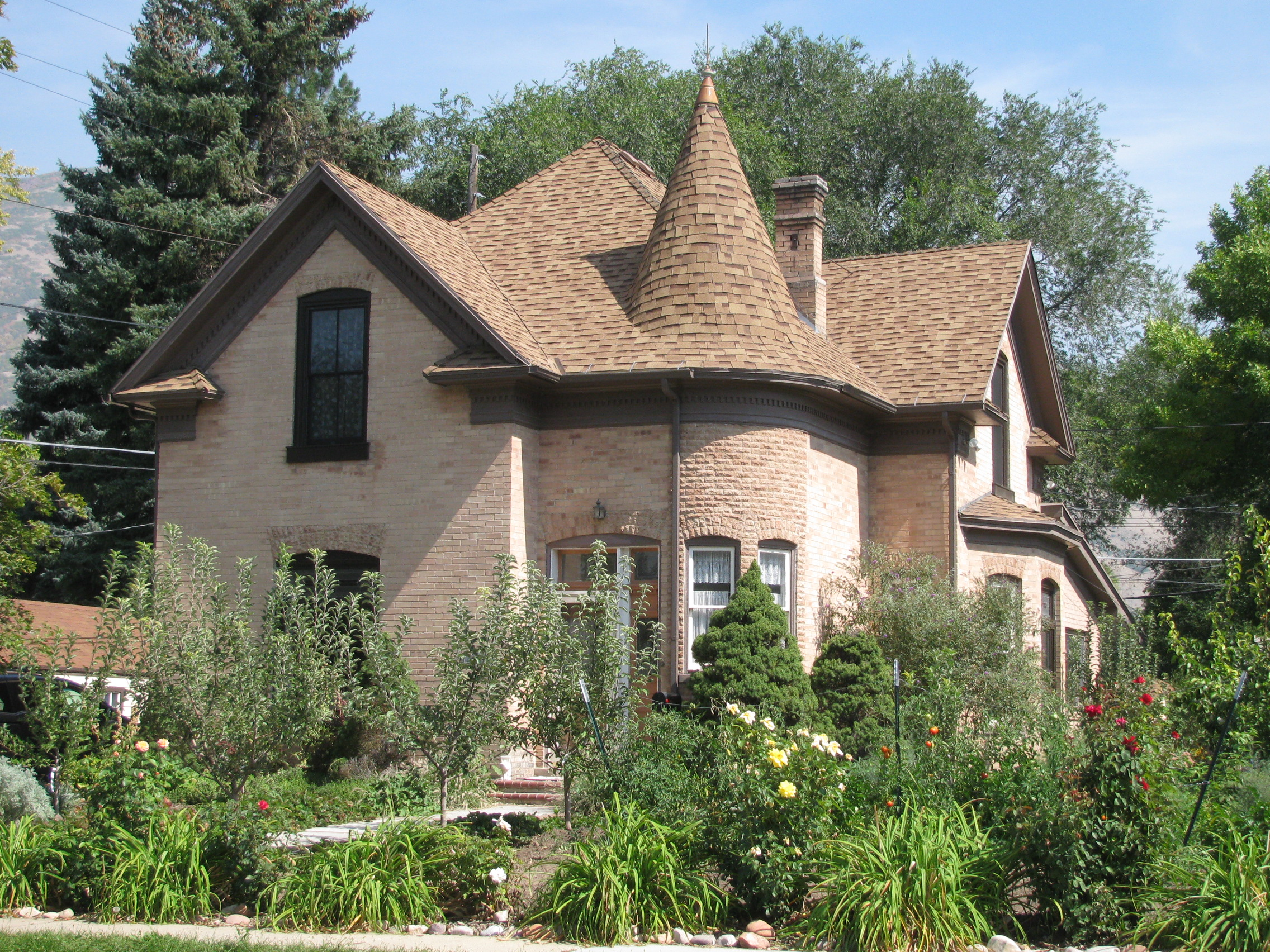
This is the Dallin House at 253 S. 300 E. associated with sculptor Cyrus E. Dallin in Springville. Built about 1905, the sculptor apparently lived there at some point in later life.

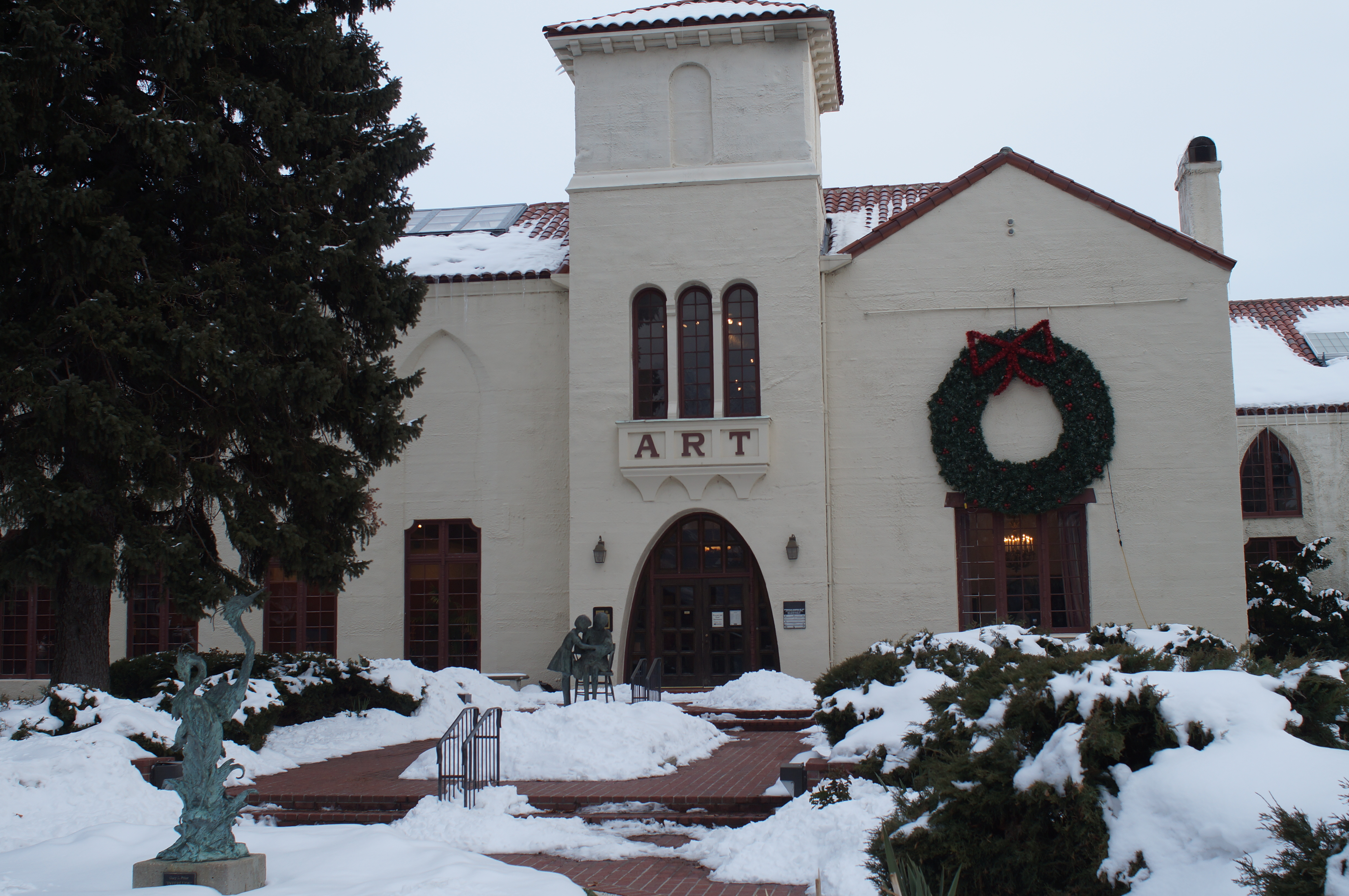
The Art Museum is on 400 South.

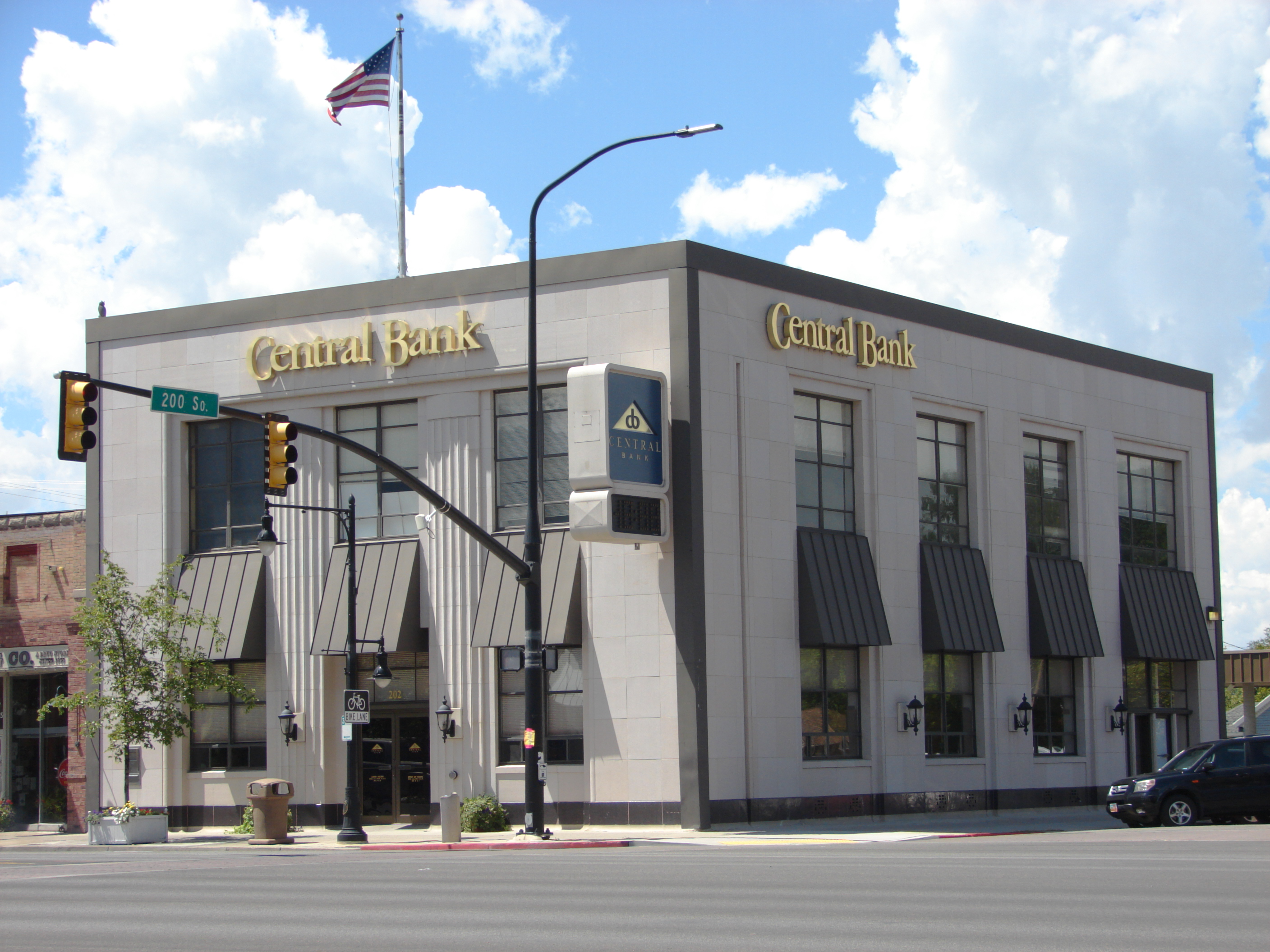
The Central Bank on South Main Street

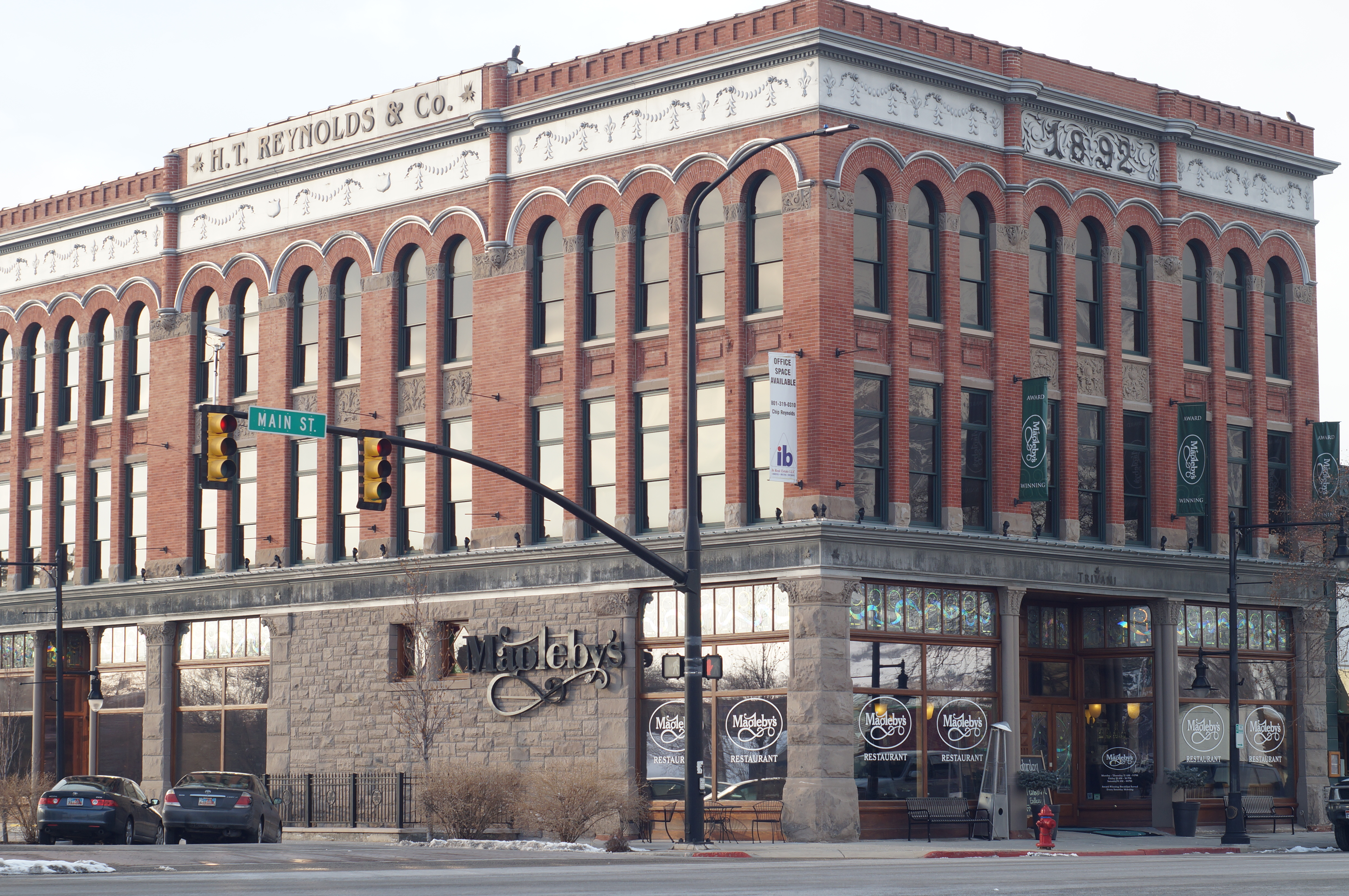
This old building is at the corner of 200 South and Main Street.

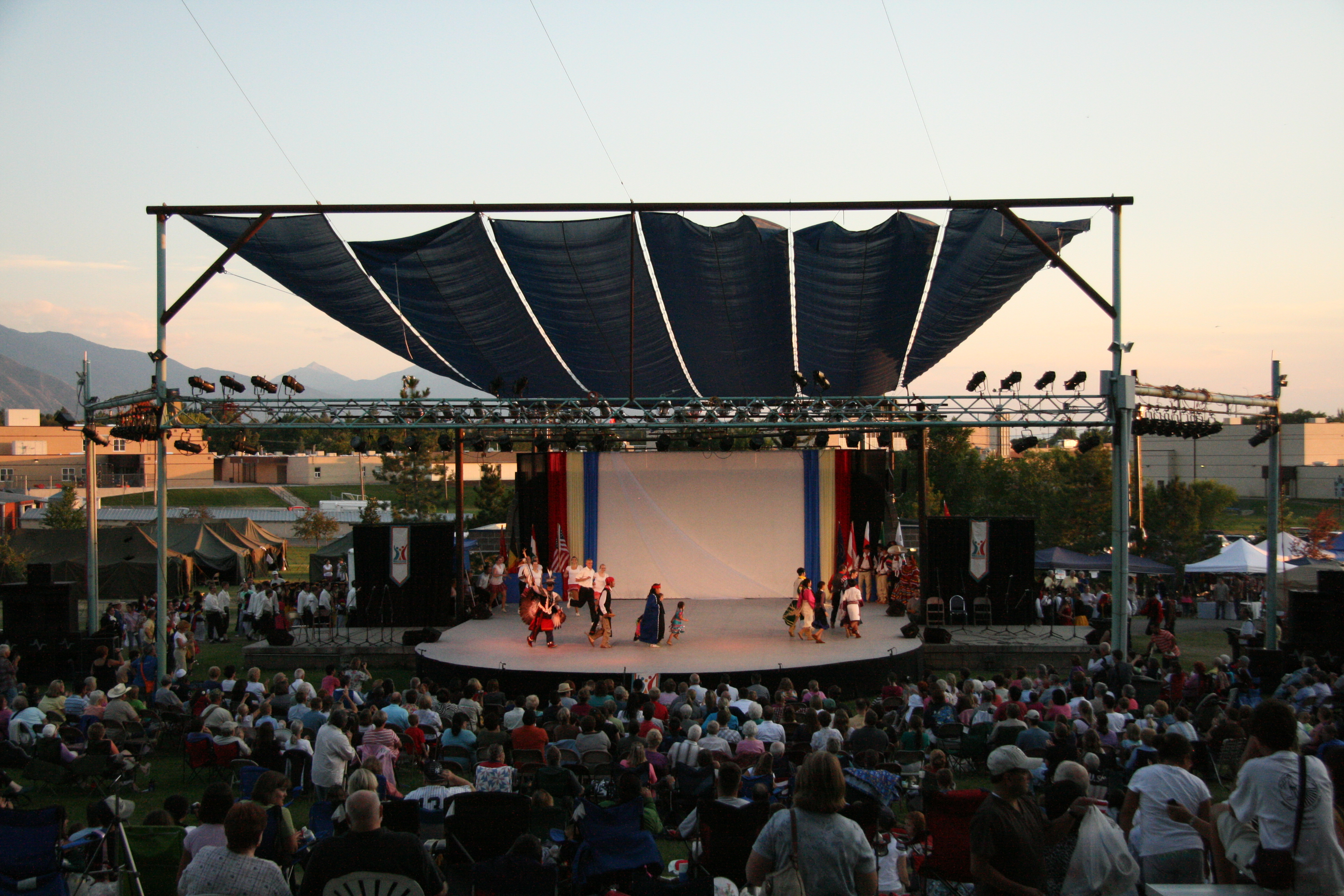
Springville, Utah's World Folkfest

== Notable people ==
- Charity Anderson (born 2000), dancer
- Quinn Allman (born 1982), musician
- Don Bluth (born 1937), film writer and director, animator
- David Dalton (born 1934), musician
- Chad Daybell (born 1968), author and husband of Lori Vallow, convicted of multiple murders
- Ruby Franke (born 1982), former YouTuber, convicted child abuser
- Jeff Decker (born 1966), sculptor
- Claybourne Elder (born 1982), actor
- Elfie Caroline Huntington (1868–1949), photographer
- Bryan Johnson (born 1977), entrepreneur and anti-aging practitioner
- Scott Mitchell (born 1968), football player
- Gary Lee Price (born 1955), sculptor
- Colby Ward (born 1964), professional baseball player

== See also ==
- List of cities and towns in Utah
