= Harley-Davidson Museum =

Transport museum in Milwaukee, Wisconsin

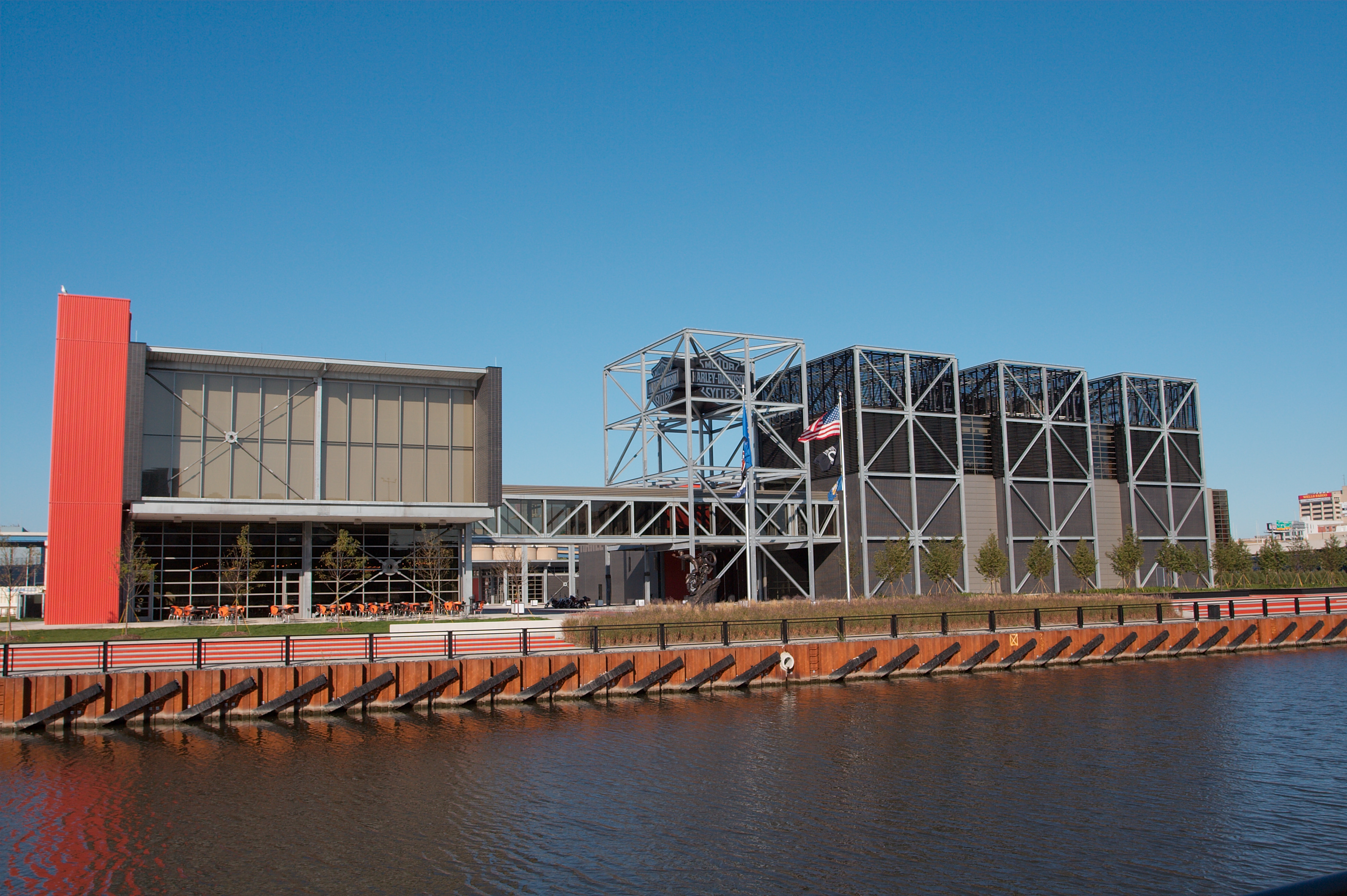
- Harley-Davidson Museum from across the Menomonee River
- Established: July 12, 2008; 18 years ago
- Location: Milwaukee, Wisconsin, U.S.
- Coordinates: 43.031°N 87.916°W
- Type: Transport museum
- Collection size: Harley-Davidson motorcycle and artifacts
- Public transit access: MCTS
- Website: Official website

The Harley-Davidson Museum is a museum in Milwaukee, Wisconsin, United States. It chronicles the history of Harley-Davidson, an American motorcycle manufacturer founded in 1903 known for its loyal brand community. (Note: "Experience Our History". Harley-Davidson.) The 130,000 square feet (12,000 m^{2}) three-building complex on 20 acres (8.1 ha) along the Menomonee River bank contains more than 450 Harley-Davidson motorcycles and hundreds of thousands of artifacts from the company's 120-year history.

== History ==
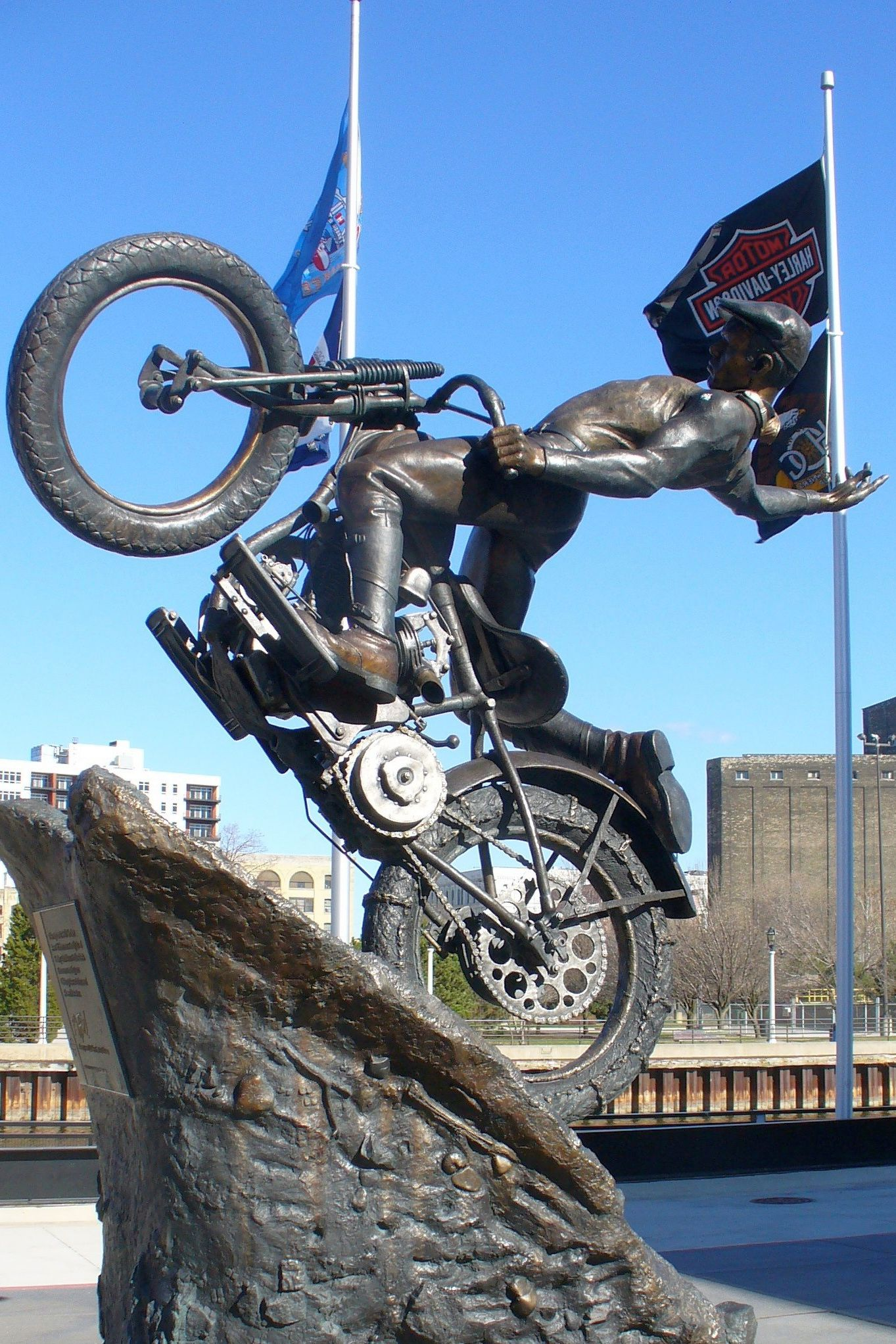
The Hill Climber

The museum opened to the public on July 12, 2008, on a 20-acre (8.1 ha) site in the Menomonee Valley. The museum was built in a historically industrial area of Milwaukee. Prior to Harley-Davidson's purchase of the land from the city, the site was formerly used by the Milwaukee Department of Public Works, Lakeshore Sand Company, and Morton Salt. (Note: Kaczkowski, Manya. "High on the hog". Midwest Airlines.) A 4-foot (1.2 m) layer of imported soil was added to combat the contaminated soil. New vegetation was planted to restore the landscape to its riparian state.

In late February 2006, designs for the museum were unveiled. (Note: "The Harley-Davidson Museum". Pentagram.) The designs were created by James Biber, a partner at Pentagram, his team, and Michael Zweck-Bonner, an associate at Pentagram. (Note: Patton, Phil (2008-07-31). "Disciples of Harley-Davidson Get Their Church". The New York Times. ISSN 1553-8095.) Abbott Miller, a partner at Pentagram, designed the museum's permanent exhibitions. The firm designed the museum over a period of eight years.

On June 1, 2006, Harley-Davidson began the construction of the US$75 million (equivalent to US$120,000,000 in 2025) complex with a groundbreaking ceremony that included legendary Harley-Davidson dirt track motorcycle racer, Scott Parker, breaking ground by doing a burnout with a Harley-Davidson XL883R Sportster, instead of with the traditional golden shovel. The site includes parking spaces for 1,000 motorcycles and 500 cars. The museum's façade also features a 17-foot (5.2 m) tall, steel Harley-Davidson sign. (Note: Springen, Karen (2008-07-10). "Harley-Davidson Museum Opens to Motorcycle Fans". Newsweek. ISSN 0028-9604.)

== Exhibits ==
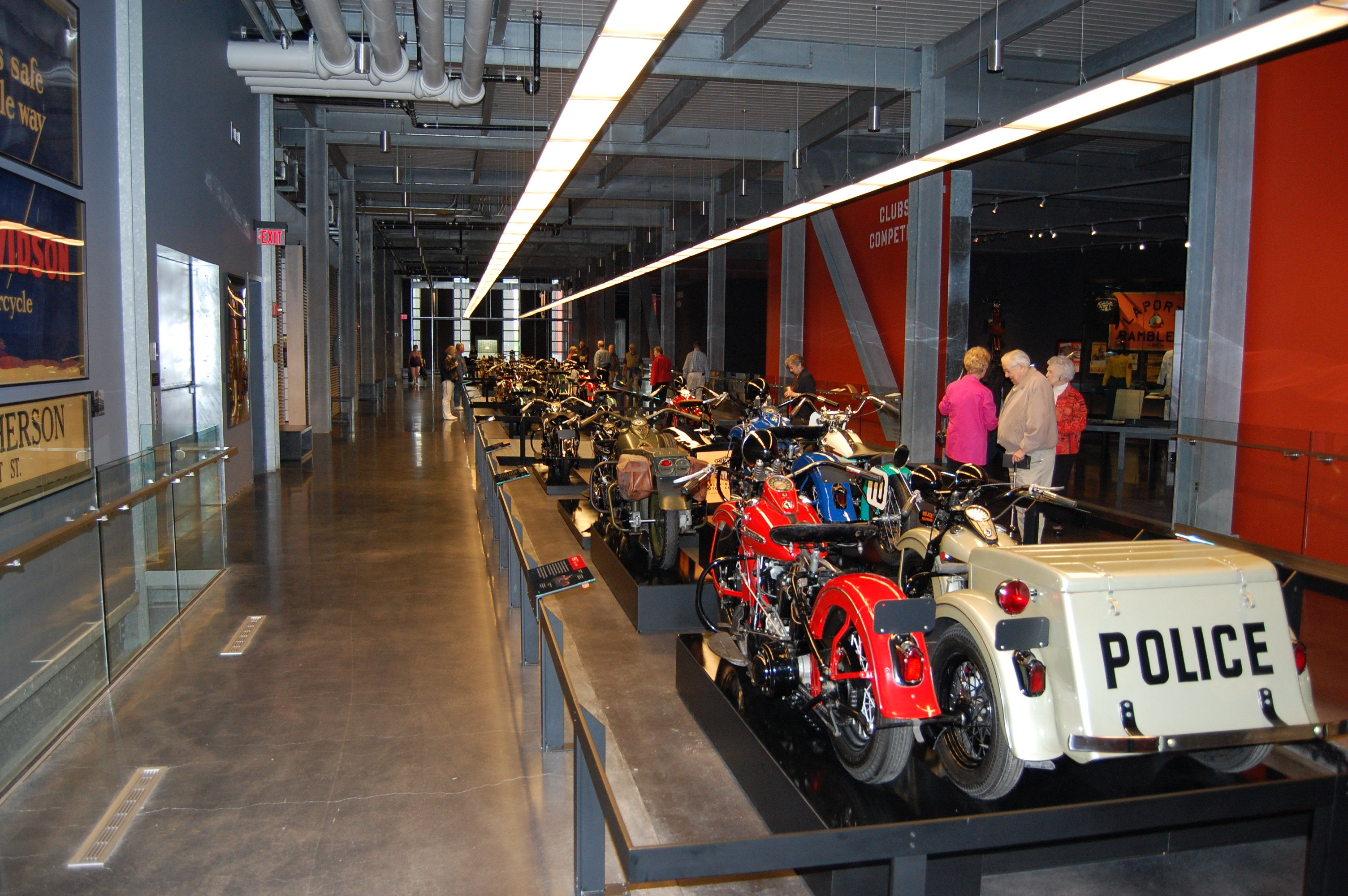
Motorcycle procession display

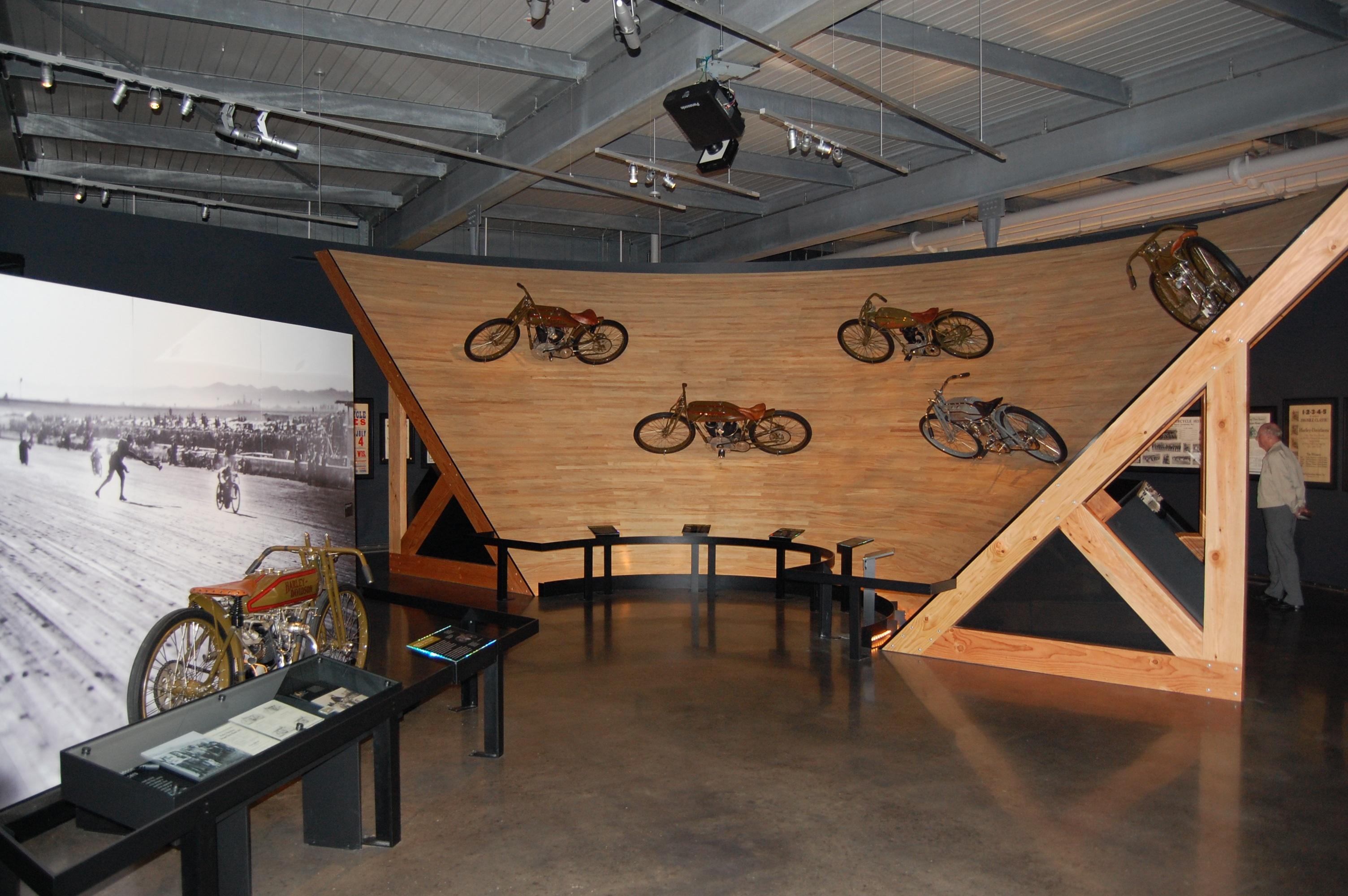
Wooden board track section

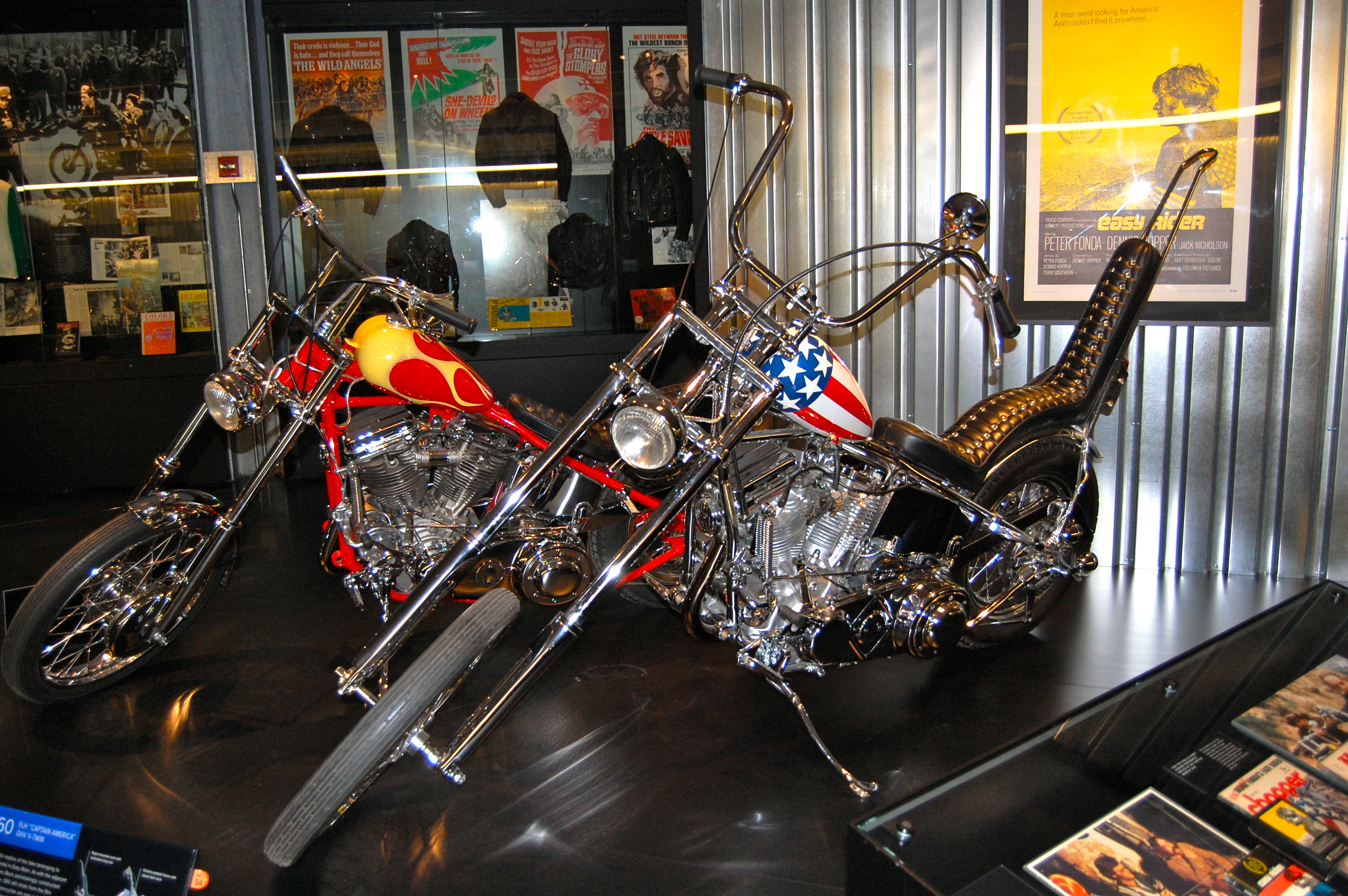
Captain America replica bike from Easy Rider

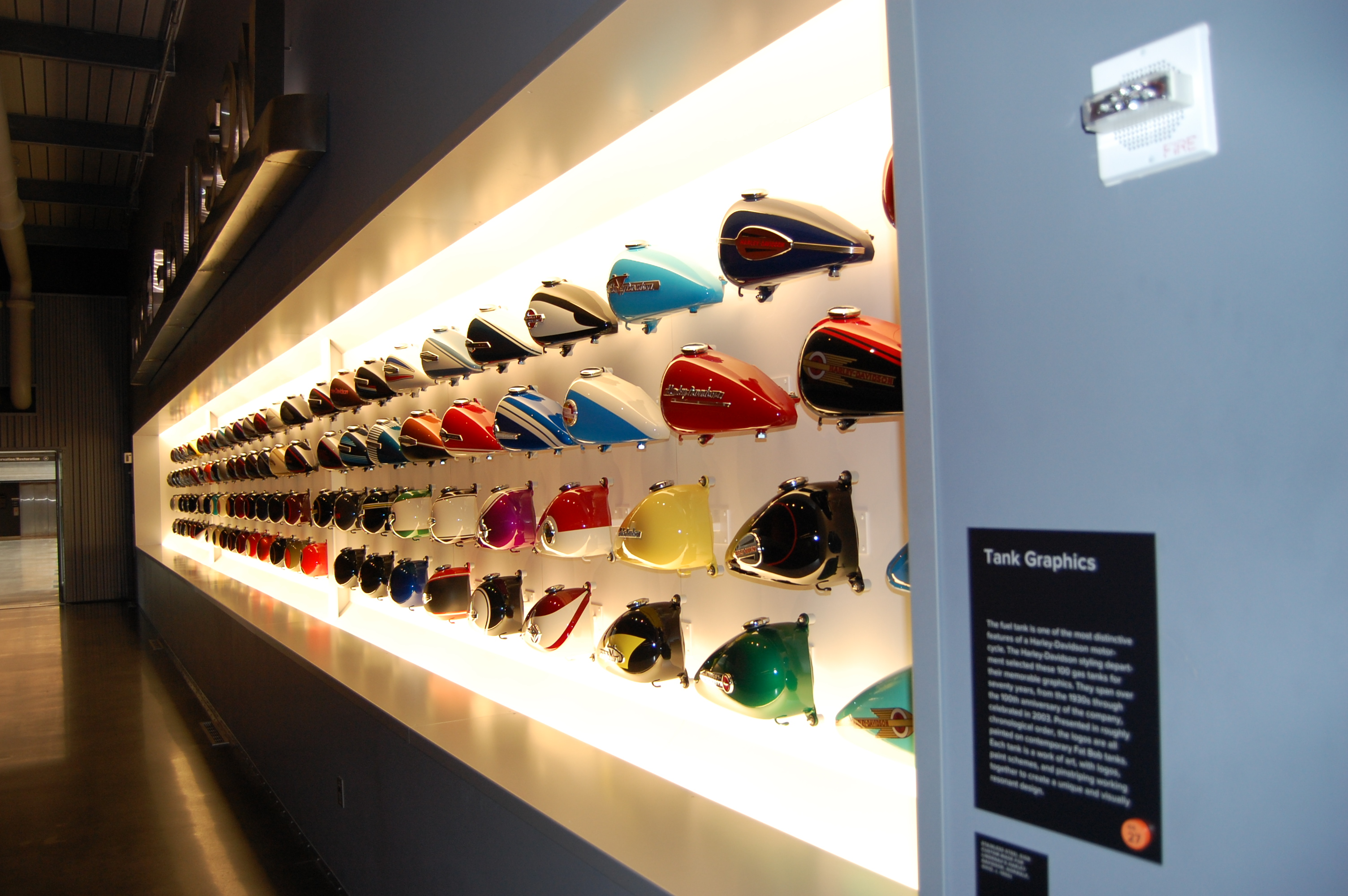
Gas tank gallery

The museum's galleries permanent exhibitions, spread throughout two floors, in addition to temporary exhibits and the motor company's archives. The complex also includes a restaurant, café, retail shop, and special event spaces.

Also on display are historic Harley-Davidson items that tell the company's story and history, such as photographs, posters, advertisements, clothes, trophies, video footage of vintage and contemporary motorcycling, and interactive exhibits, including 10 motorcycles that visitors can sit on.

=== The Motorcycle Gallery ===
On the museum's upper level, a procession of motorcycles is displayed down the center of the main hall, running the length of the building, with galleries on either side.

=== The Harley-Davidson Journey ===
Along the east side of the upstairs galleries, a series of interconnected galleries exhibit the Harley-Davidson's chronological history. The galleries relate the company's history from its origins in a 10 by 15 foot (3.0 m × 4.6 m) wooden shack to its current status as the top U.S. motorcycle manufacturer, producing more than 330,000 bikes each year. The centerpiece of the gallery is "Serial Number One", the oldest known Harley-Davidson in existence, which is encased in glass. The glass enclosure sits within a floor-embedded, illuminated outline of the backyard shed the motor company was founded in.

=== The Engine Room ===
The museum's second floor galleries begin with the Engine Room. A Knucklehead engine is displayed disassembled into several pieces. The Engine Room also features several interactive touch screen elements that show how Harley motors, including Panhead and Shovelhead motors work. (Note: Carpenter, Susan (2008-07-06). "The new Harley-Davidson Museum is hog heaven". Los Angeles Times. Milwaukee. ISSN 2165-1736.)

=== Clubs and Competition ===
The Clubs and Competition gallery includes displays and information about Harley-Davidson's racing history. The gallery includes a section of a replica wooden board track, suspended in the air at a 45-degree incline. The wooden track features vintage video footage of actual board track races, and attached 1920s-era Harley-Davidson racing motorcycles; the bikes that raced on board tracks at 100 miles per hour (160 km/h). Fatalities were common, which led to the banning of wooden board tracks for motorcycle racing.

=== Tank Gallery ===
The museum's upper floor exhibits also include the Gas Tank Gallery, formerly part of the Harley-Davidson 100th Anniversary Open Road Tour. The exhibit displays 100 of Harley-Davidson's most memorable tank graphics, spanning 70 years, selected by the company's styling department and reproduced on "Fat Bob" tanks.

=== Custom Culture ===
The Custom Culture gallery covers Harley-Davidson's impact on American and global culture. The centerpiece of the Custom Culture Gallery is "King Kong", a 13 foot (4.0 m) long, two-engine Harley-Davidson motorcycle customized by Felix Predko. The exhibit also features exact replicas of the customized Harley-Davidson bikes ridden by Peter Fonda and Dennis Hopper in the 1969 film Easy Rider, including Fonda's "Captain America" chopper and Hopper's "Billy Bike". Two of each of the two choppers were created, and one "Captain America" was destroyed in the film's production.

== Corporate archives and collections ==
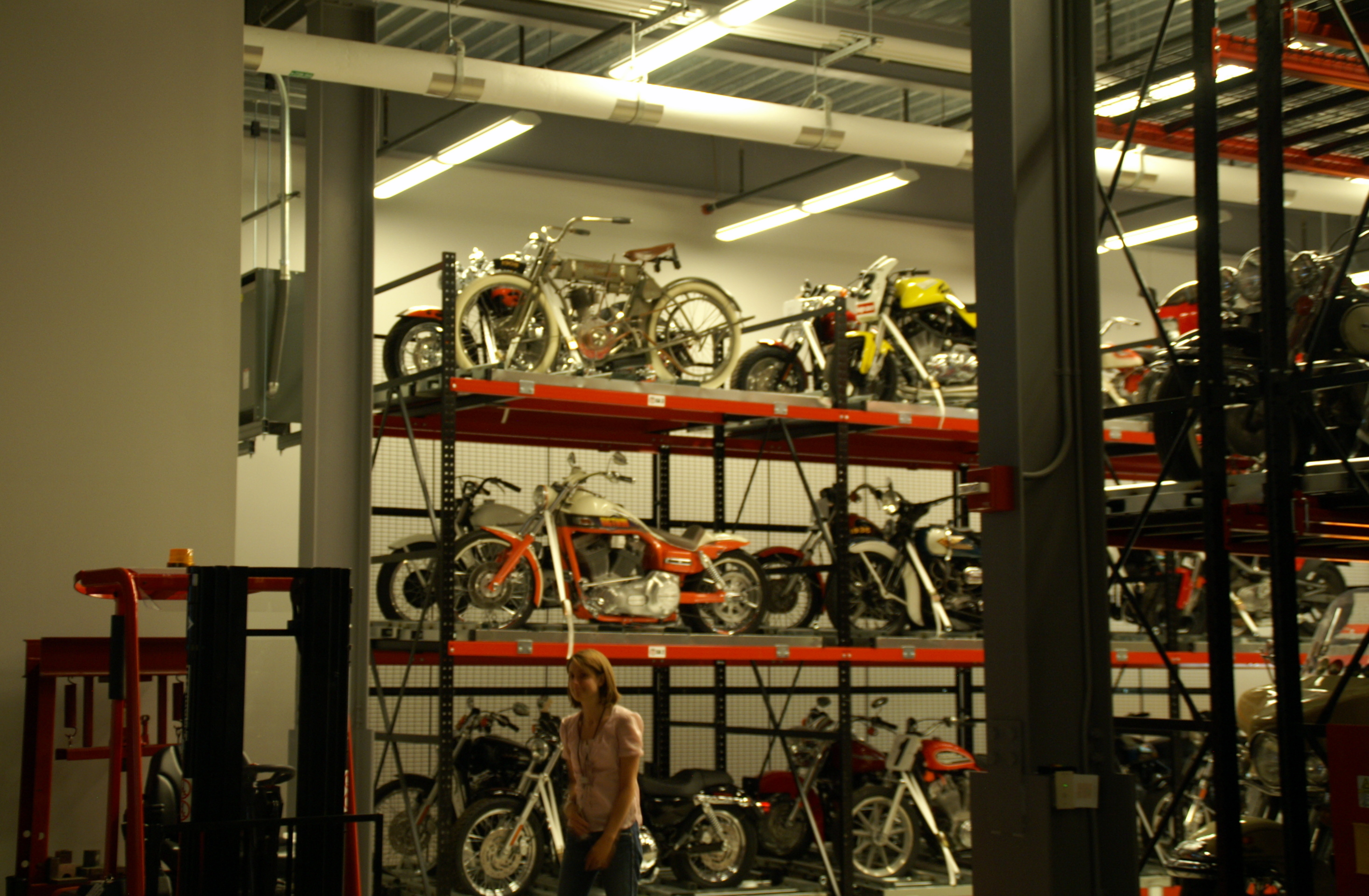
Motorcycle archives at Harley-Davidson museum

The Harley-Davidson Motor Company's corporate archives are also housed on the museum's grounds. The archives supplied more than 85% of the items on display in the museum. Since 1915, the company's founders decided to pull one bike from the production line to be preserved in an archive. One motorcycle on display was recovered on a beach in British Columbia after being swept out to sea more than 4,000 miles (6,400 km) away in a tsunami that hit Japan in 2011. (Note: Billock, Jennifer (2016-09-12). "The Motorcycle That Rode the Tsunami". Smithsonian. ISSN 0037-7333.)

== See also ==
- The Hill Climber outdoor sculpture
