= Spanish Fork =

Spanish Fork may refer to:

- Enciclopedia Libre Universal en Español - a fork of the Spanish language Wikipedia
- Spanish Fork, a stream in Boise County, Idaho, northwest of Idaho City
- Spanish Fork, Utah, a city in southern Utah County
  - Spanish Fork High School
- Spanish Fork Canyon, a canyon through which the Spanish Fork (river) and Soldier Creek flow, southeast of the city
- Spanish Fork (river), a river that flows through Spanish Fork Canyon, through the city of Spanish Fork, and into Utah Lake
