= Kay S. Cornaby =

American politician

Member of the Utah State Senate from the 7th district
- In office 1977–1990

Personal details
- Born: January 14, 1936 (age 90) Spanish Fork, Utah, U.S.
- Died: November 25, 2013
- Party: Republican
- Education: Brigham Young University; Harvard Law School

Kay S. Cornaby (January 14, 1936 – November 25, 2013) was an American politician. He served as a Republican member for the 7th district of the Utah State Senate from 1977 to 1990.
