= Spanish Fork Fire Station =

- Formerly listed on the U.S. National Register of Historic Places
- Location: 365 N. Main St., Spanish Fork, Utah
- Area: Less than one acre
- Built: 1934
- Architectural style: Colonial Revival
- MPS: Public Works Buildings TR
- NRHP reference No.: 85000818

Significant dates
- Added to NRHP: April 1, 1985
- Removed from NRHP: October 7, 1996

The Spanish Fork Fire Station was built in 1934 in Spanish Fork, Utah, United States. It included Colonial Revival architecture. It was listed on the National Register of Historic Places in 1985.

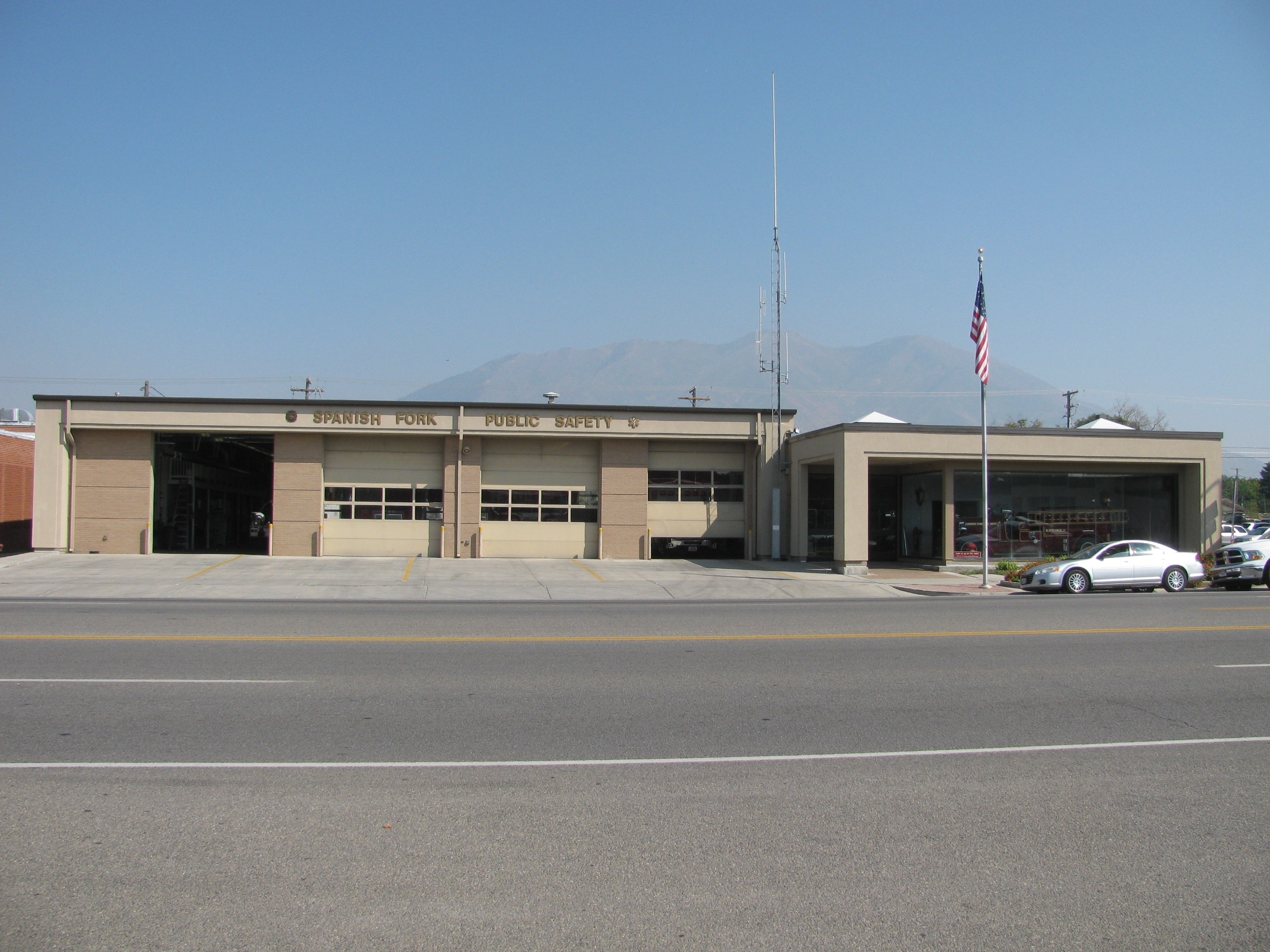
September 2012 photo of replacement station

The station was delisted from the National Register in 1996. Delisting occurs usually when a historic building has been demolished or otherwise lost its historic integrity.

== See also ==
- National Register of Historic Places listings in Utah County, Utah
