= Icelandic heritage in Spanish Fork, Utah =

Spanish Fork, Utah, was the first Icelandic settlement in the United States. Icelandic people settled there primarily from 1855 to 1914. Icelandic influence in Spanish Fork is still prevalent today. This is primarily visible in the Icelandic Monument found in Spanish Fork, as well as the festivals that have been held over the years to pay tribute to the Icelandic people who helped establish Spanish Fork.

== Icelanders in Spanish Fork ==
There was a large religious component in the motivation of the early Icelandic settlers coming to Utah. A majority of the Icelandic people that settled in Spanish Fork were members of the Church of Jesus Christ of Latter Day Saints, especially in the earlier years. These people learned of the Church while they were still in Iceland. The first people to bring word of the Church to the Vestmannaeyjar (Westman Islands), which is where many of these Icelandic immigrants lived before they came to America, were Thorarinn Haflidason and Gudmundur Gudmundsson. They had learned about the religion while they were in Denmark learning trade. They brought their new religion back to the Vestmannaeyjar, and taught it to their friends and family there. The people who converted to the Church of Jesus Christ of Latter Day Saints later moved from Iceland to Utah because that was the location of the Church headquarters, and prosperity was promised to the members who moved there.

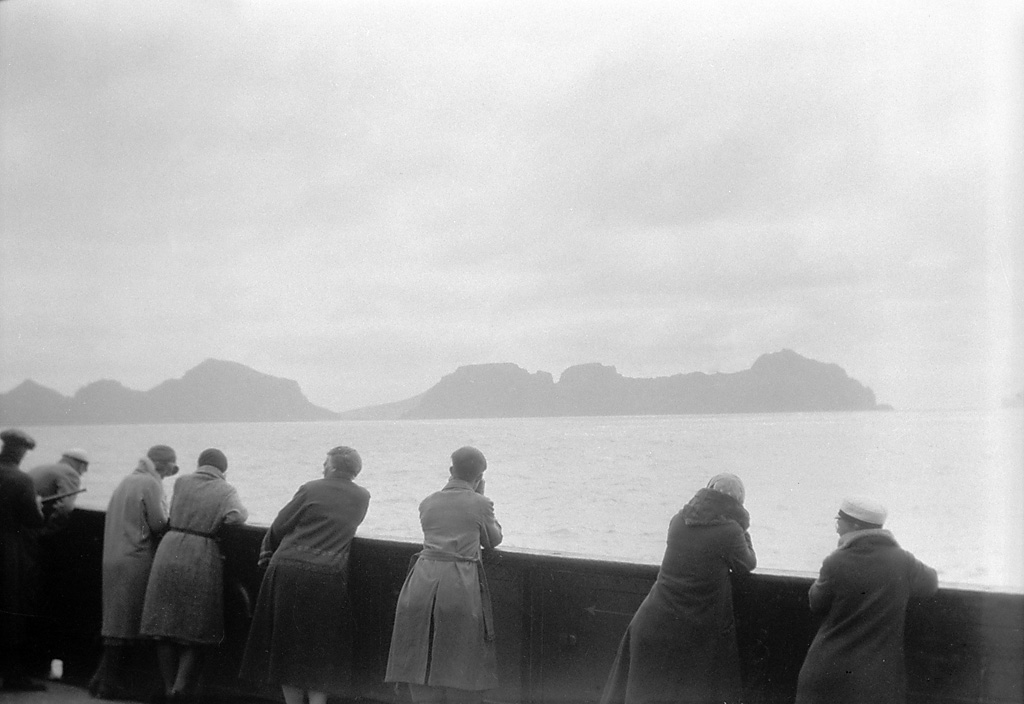
Vestmannaeyjar (Vestmannaeyjar)

=== Early life of the Icelanders in Spanish Fork ===
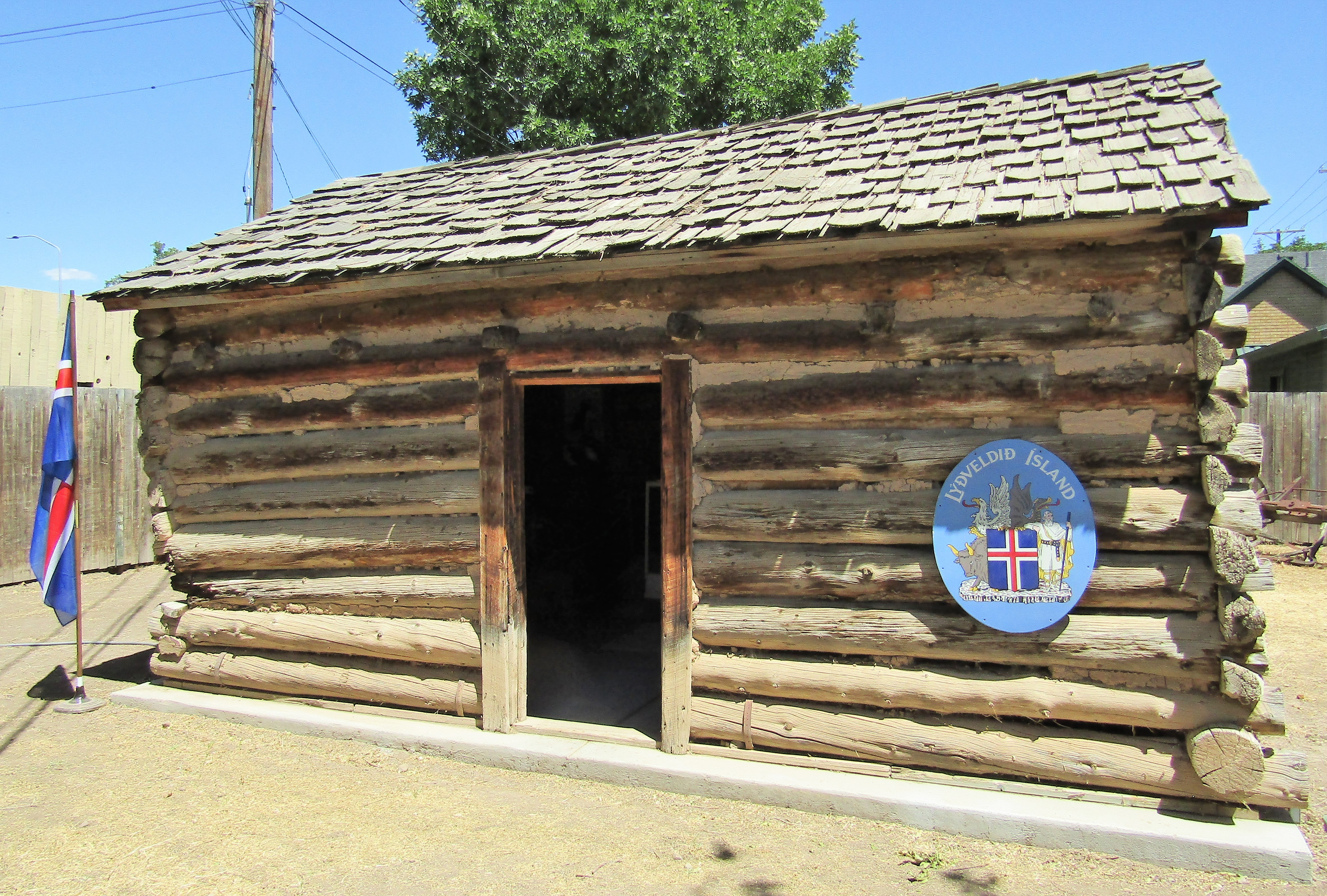
Spanish Fork Pioneer Cabin

After first traveling to Salt Lake City, Utah, and being directed by Brigham Young, the president of the Church of Jesus Christ of Latter-day Saints, to go south, the first three Icelandic settlers, Samuel and Margret Bjarnson and Helga Jónsdóttir, arrived in Spanish Fork on September 7, 1855. Their journey from Iceland took 10 months over land and sea (information found on the plaques at the Icelandic monument). They were directed to settle in Spanish Fork by Brigham Young due to the area already being inhabited by other Scandinavian people. All the Icelanders who came after them chose to come to Spanish Fork as well in an effort to maintain their culture. By 1860 there were 16 Icelanders living in Spanish Fork, making it the first permanent Icelandic settlement in the United States. The Scandinavian settlers already in Spanish Fork occupied different areas of the city, the Icelanders lived closely together in the southeast part of town.

When Icelanders first moved to Spanish Fork they lived in dug-outs, holes which they dug in order to provide a quick means of shelter; however, the Icelanders were known to be skilled in the art of building homes and quickly built the nicest homes Spanish Fork had seen. Spanish Fork came to be known as “Little Iceland.” The Icelanders living in Utah saw it as not only a place of religious freedom, but also a place of great opportunity to build a new home and receive new opportunities. These new opportunities also inspired Icelanders who were not members of the Church to emigrate from Iceland to Utah. They wrote home to their friends and family about their experiences. Although in their letters they acknowledged the difficulty of cultural differences, they referred to Utah as the “Sunshine Land” and invited their friends and family to come and join them. In addition, some Icelanders who were members of the Church returned to Iceland between the years of 1860 and 1914 to share their religion and new home with other Icelanders, inviting them to join the Church and embark to Utah. By 1914 there was a total of 410 Icelandic people settled in Spanish Fork.

== Icelandic Monument ==
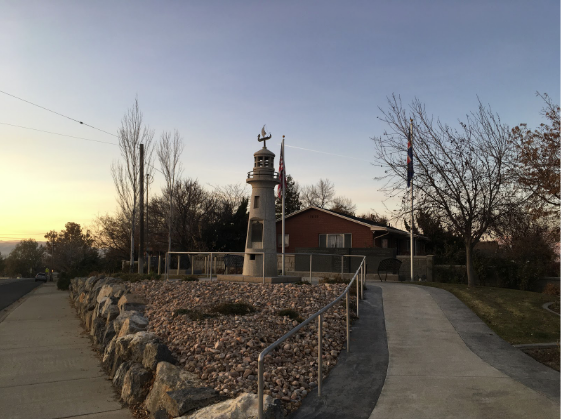
Icelandic Monument, Lighthouse

The Icelandic Monument is located at 785 E Canyon Road Spanish Fork, Utah. The monument consists of a wall listing the names of the 410 original Icelandic settlers, a lighthouse, and an Icelandic rock. On the side of the lighthouse there is also a list of names, sixteen of the first Icelandic people to settle in Spanish Fork. The purpose of the monument was to pay tribute to the people who founded the town, and to create a bridge between Iceland and Spanish Fork today. The bridge has been reinforced by a sister monument that was built in Iceland.

The monument was first erected and dedicated in 1938 by the Daughters of Utah Pioneers and the Utah Icelandic Association as part of the Icelandic Days celebration. It was dedicated on August 2, 1938, by Andrew Jensen, the Assistant Church Historian for the Church of Jesus Christ of Latter-day Saints at the time. Mary Hanson Sherwood, one of the 16 Icelandic settlers who came between 1855 and 1860 (name listed on plaque) was present and had the opportunity to speak. The original monument consisted of only the lighthouse with a plaque on the side containing the names of the first 16 Icelandic settlers.

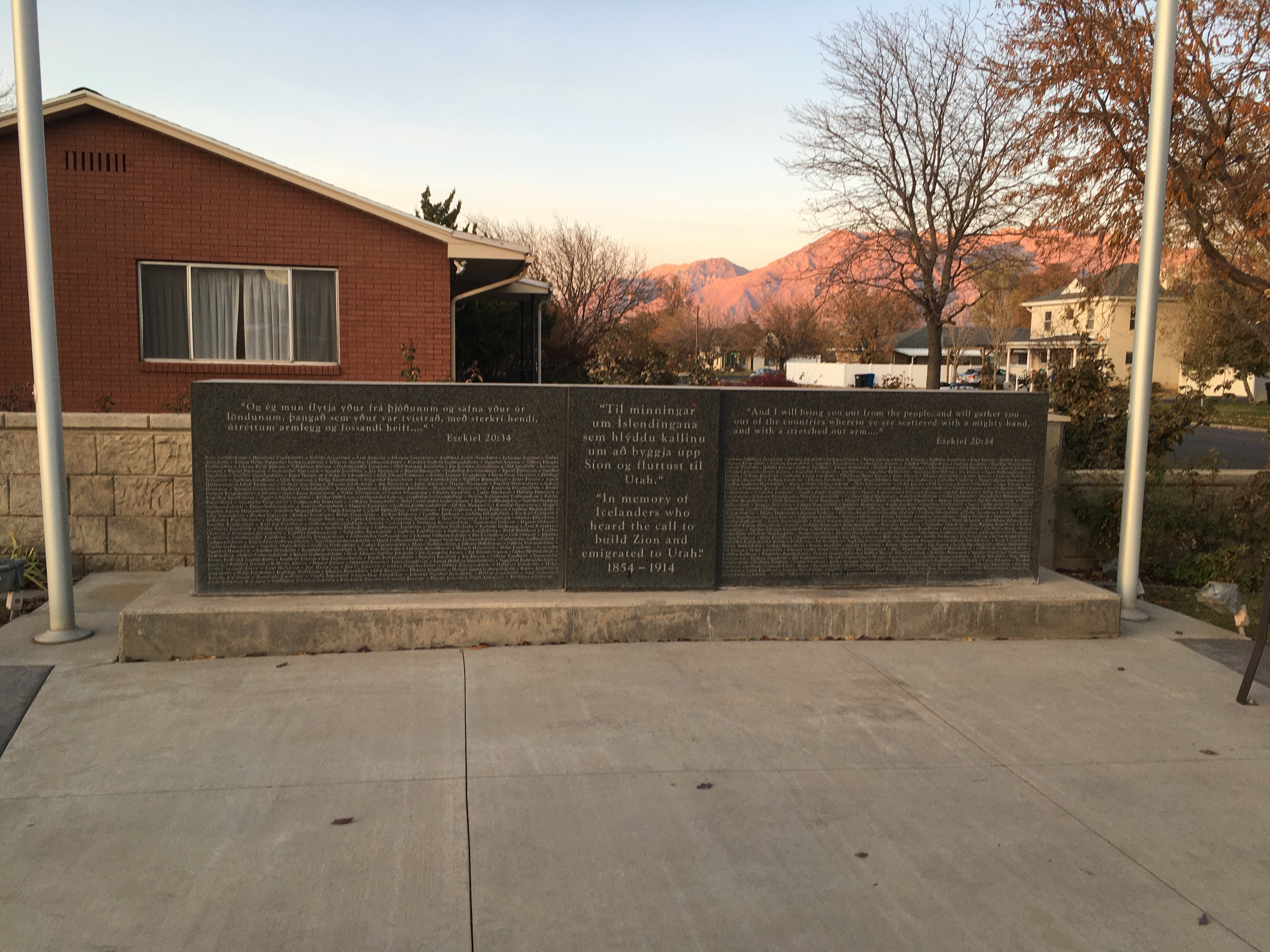
Icelandic Monument, Wall

In 2005, the Spanish Fork Monument was renovated and received three new updates: a rock from the shore of Vestmannaeyjar where its sister monument is located, a wall with a list of the 410 names of the Icelanders that immigrated to Utah prior to 1914, and other plaques giving explanations of the historical events of Icelanders coming to Spanish Fork. Gordon B. Hinckley, the President of the Church of Jesus Christ of Latter-day Saints in 2005 requested, and was given permission, to dedicate the newly renovated Icelandic Monument. It was rededicated on June 25, 2005. Nearly 4,000 people, many of Icelandic descent and 120 of them visitors from Iceland were present for the dedication and the celebrations of that event. Olafur Ragnar Gimsson, President of Iceland at that time, was also present at the dedication.

=== Names of 16 original Icelandic settlers ===
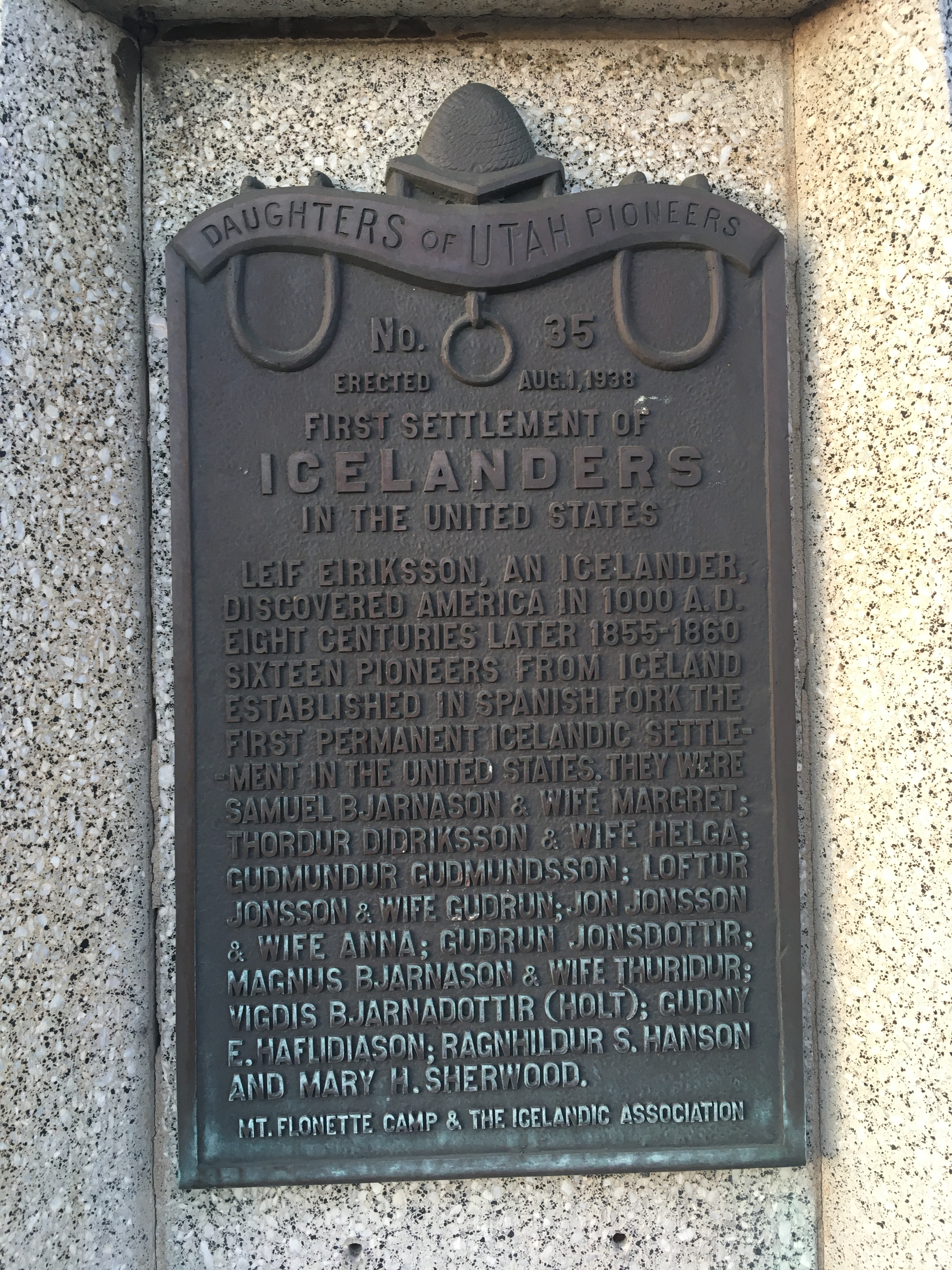
Plaque with names

The following is the list of the 16 Icelandic settlers that first came to Spanish Fork between 1855 and 1860 as found on the plaque at the Icelandic monument in Spanish Fork:

- Samuel Bjarnason and his wife Margrét
- Þórður Diðriksson and his wife Helga
- Guðmundur Guðmundsson
- Loftur Jónsson and his wife Guðrún
- Jón Jónsson and his wife Anna
- Gudrún Jónsdóttir
- Magnús Bjarnason and his wife Þuríður
- Vigdís Bjarnadóttir (Holt)
- Guðný Erasmusdóttir Haflíðason
- Ragnhildur Stefánsdóttir Hanson
- Mary H. Sherwood

Because of differences between Icelandic naming traditions and English naming traditions, as well as differences between Icelandic orthography and English orthography, several of these people went by more than one name and/or name spelling throughout their lives.

=== Sister monument in Vestmannaeyjar, Iceland ===
On June 30, 2000, a sister monument to the Spanish Fork Monument in Vestmannaeyjar was dedicated by Elder William Rolfe Kerr, a leader in the Church of Jesus Christ of Latter-day Saints at that time. It was built in order to remember the 410 Icelanders who emigrated from Iceland to Utah. This monument stands right next to the Atlantic Ocean in a place where many converts to the Church were baptized before embarking on their trip to Utah. The names of all those 410 Icelanders are found on the monument and were added in 2005 to the Spanish Fork monument as well.

== Icelandic celebrations ==
In an effort to help the Scandinavian settlers assimilate the leaders of the Church of Jesus Christ of Latter-day Saints encouraged members to have activities, including church meetings together. Until this point, members had congregated for church in their native language, however, they followed the counsel of church leaders and began meeting with those from different countries. Although this change caused them to be in an unfamiliar situation and culture, they were able to keep pieces of their culture. In order to spend time together, support one another, and remember their culture and heritage they began the celebration of Iceland Day (originally on August 2). In general, Icelanders are proud of their heritage and make efforts to hold on to their roots. Evidence of this is found in the linguistic abilities of second generation Icelanders. The majority of second generation Icelanders living outside of Iceland can speak Icelandic just as well as their parents. In an effort to teach their posterity about their Icelandic heritage many celebrations have taken place in Spanish Fork.

=== Centennial Celebration ===
One of the most significant Icelandic celebrations that has taken place in Spanish Fork was the Centennial Celebration on June 15, 16, and 17 in 1955. It marked the 100 year anniversary of the first Icelanders coming to Spanish Fork. Icelandic celebrations usually involve dancing, singing, and other activities such as Glima that remind Icelanders of their heritage, the Centennial Celebration was no exception. The Centennial Celebration Program Pamphlet included the full schedule of events for those three days. Many of the activities were held outside or at Spanish Fork High School in the auditorium, and were free to attend. The activities included a pageant (which was meant to symbolize the migration of early Icelanders), Glima (Icelandic wrestling), parades, city tours for visitors, and speeches by a representative from the U.S. State Department as well as a representative from Iceland.

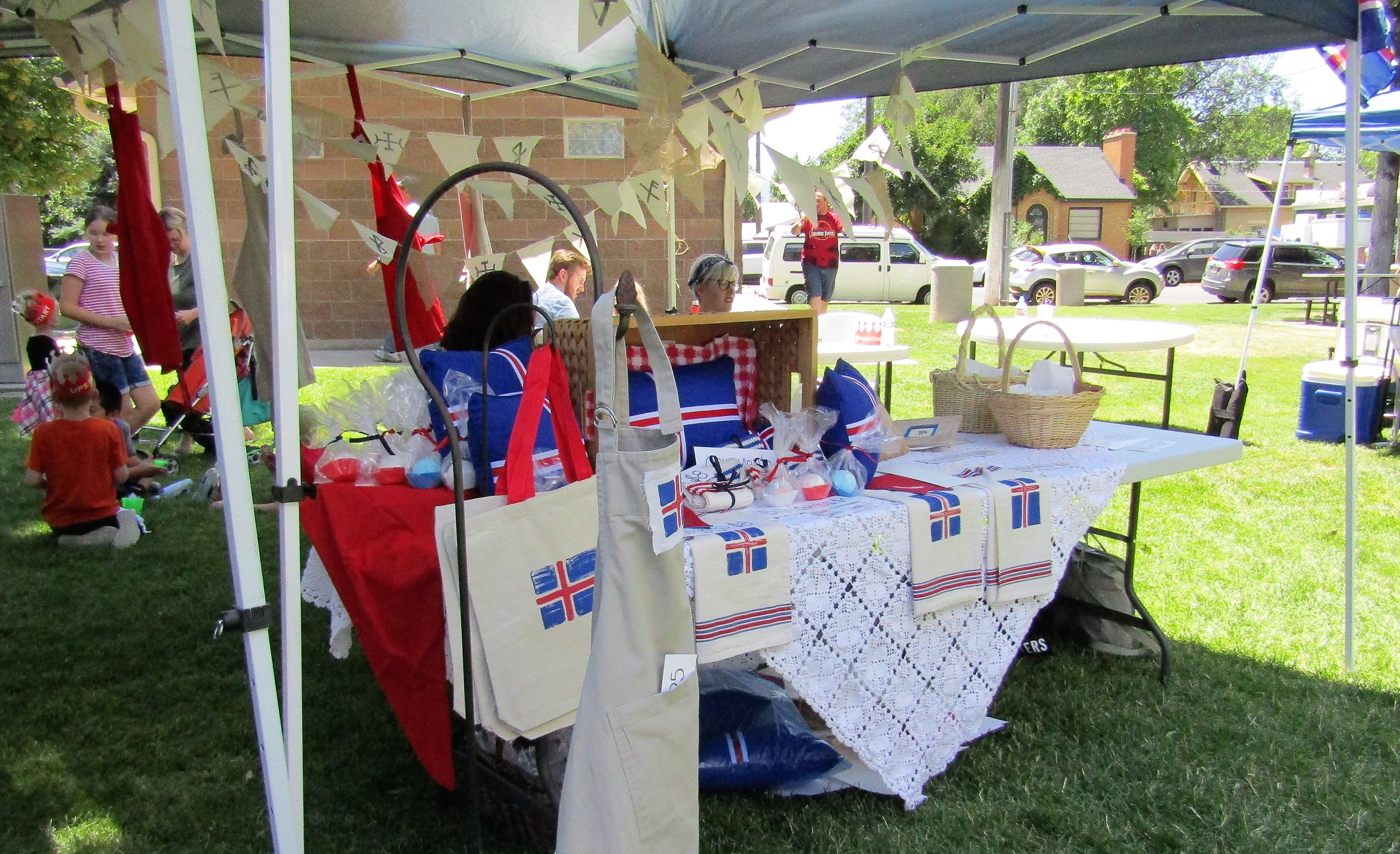
Iceland Days; Fire and Ice Festival Booth

=== Annual celebration ===
In addition to this special Centennial Celebration, Icelanders first celebrated what was called “Icelander Days” in 1897. Today in Spanish Fork, they hold an annual celebration which is often called “Iceland Days”. It is usually held in June and today involves Icelandic food, celebrations, and visiting the historic Icelandic sites in Spanish Fork. People from Spanish Fork, as well as surrounding areas, many of Icelandic descent, enjoy participating in this annual celebration.
