= D. Elden Beck =

American entomologist (1906–1967)

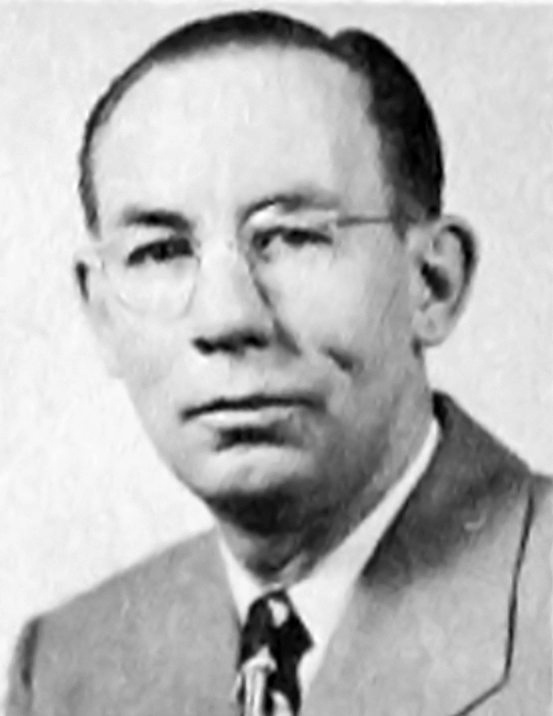
- Born: April 11, 1906; Spanish Fork, Utah
- Died: August 9, 1967 (aged 61)
- Spouse: Florence Robinson
- Children: 4

D. Elden Beck (April 11, 1906 – August 9, 1967) was a professor of zoology and entomology at Brigham Young University (BYU). Beck served as the chair beginning in 1962. Before his time at BYU, he served as the head of the Biology Department at Dixie Junior College. He served in the United States Army Medical Department from 1943 to 1945. Beck also helped develop mosquito control programs in Utah County and with the World Health Organization. His research led to the discovery of a new genus and five new species, along with multiple photographs in magazines and multiple collections in museums. In his personal life, he married Florence Robinson in 1933 and had four children. Beck died on August 9, 1967, at the age of 61.

== Early life ==
D. Elden Beck was born in Spanish Fork, Utah, on April 11, 1906, to Mitchell Robertson Beck and Ruth Eleanor Davis. Beck was a member of the Church of Jesus Christ of Latter-day Saints (LDS Church). He was baptized in 1914. In 1914, his family moved to McGill, Nevada. Beck first attended school there, and enjoyed playing pranks, camping, and collecting insects, rocks, plants and animals. In 1921, he and his family moved to Lava Hot Springs, Idaho, where Beck graduated from high school in 1925.

== Education ==
Beck attended Brigham Young University (BYU) in Provo, Utah, and studied zoology and entomology. While he was at BYU, Beck lived with his grandmother in Spanish Fork and commuted each day. He also enlisted in the Medical Corps of the National Guard, and served for three years. Beck was selected to participate in a biology field expedition in 1928 where he spent six weeks surveying land in Idaho and Utah. During his senior year at BYU, he was a laboratory instructor in general zoology. He graduated from BYU in 1929 with his bachelor's degree, and in 1930 with a master's degree. Beck then got his Ph.D. from Iowa State College in 1933. On May 31, 1933, he married Florence Robinson in the Salt Lake Temple. The couple had four children.

== Career ==
Beck was made the head of the Biology Department at Dixie Junior College in St. George, Utah, after his graduation in 1933. He stayed at Dixie College until 1938 when he went to teach at BYU in the Zoology and Entomology Department, of which he became chair in 1962.

Beck served in the Medical Entomological Service of the United States Army Medical Department from 1943 to 1945. While stationed in Guadalcanal, Beck collected insects and reptiles which were sent back to BYU. This collection included over 16,000 insect specimens. He was promoted to captain in 1945. He was honorably discharged in October 1945.

After his service, Beck returned to BYU. He studied mosquito abatement and the effects of atom bombs on wildlife. With his research, he helped develop a mosquito control program for Utah County. Beck left BYU on sabbatical to do research at the American Museum of Natural History in New York City and at Lake Placid, Florida. Beck's research resulted in a new genus and five new species. His research included many photographs of plants and animals that were published in various magazines.

He served as an adviser of the World Health Organization on malaria and mosquito control from 1956 to 1958, working closely with the Chinese government. Beck also spent two years working with the Taiwan Provincial Malaria Research Institute. Beck had a collection of earthworms that he began in 1948. This collection was sent to the American Museum of Natural History.

== Other contributions ==
Beck was an active member of the LDS Church. He served as the superintendent of the local Sunday School and held the office of high priest.

Beck served as the president of the Provo Junior Chamber of Commerce. He was also the editor of the Provo, Utah, "Centennial Souvenir 1849–1949".

Beck died on August 9, 1967, in Provo, Utah.
