= Palmyra, Utah =

- CDP
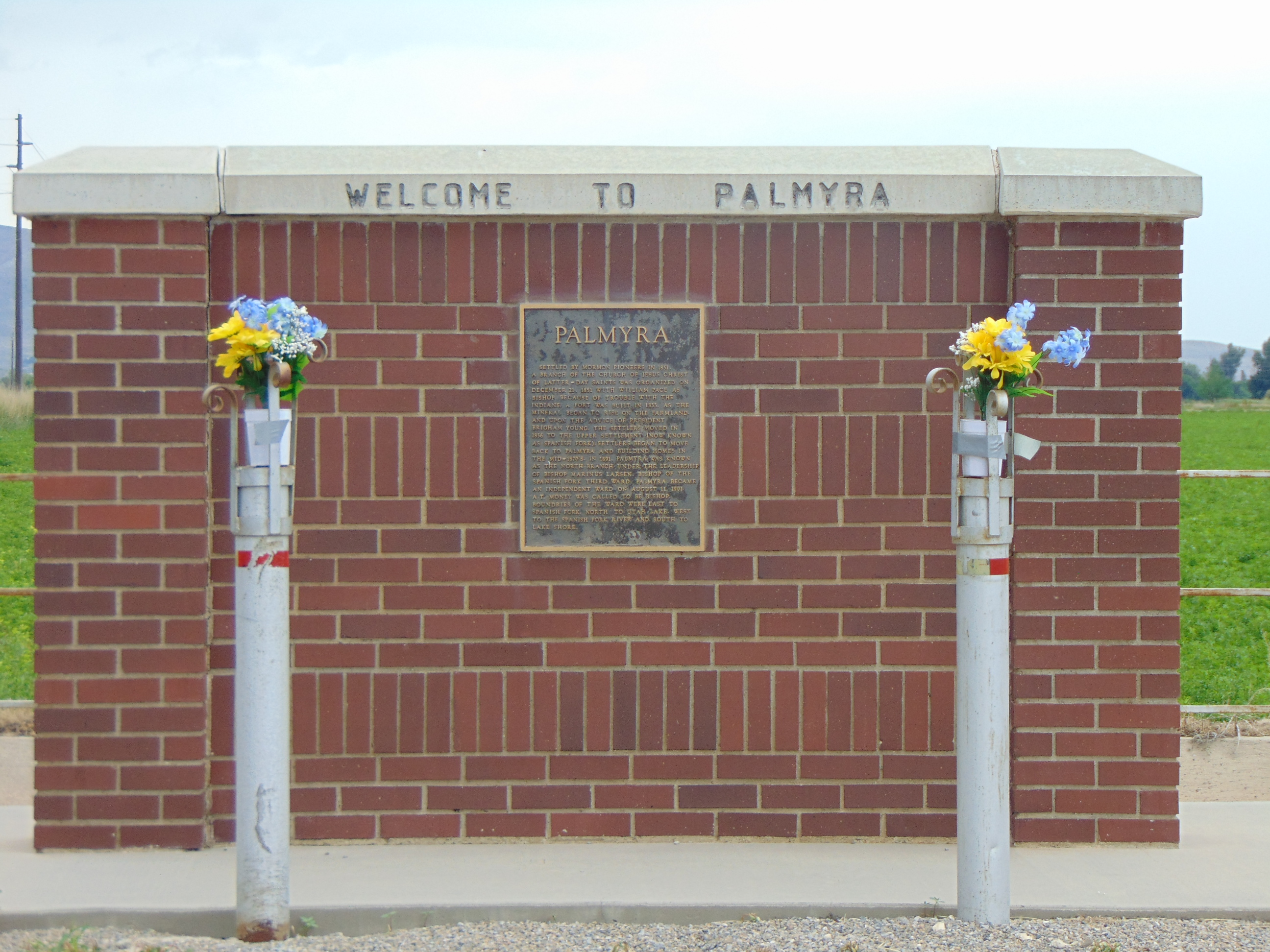
- Welcome to Palmyra sign, June 2016

- Location in Utah County and the state of Utah
- Coordinates: 40°7′36″N 111°41′7″W
- Country: United States
- State: Utah
- County: Utah
- Named for: Palmyra, New York

Area
  - Total: 11.7 sq mi (30.4 km^{2})
  - Land: 11.5 sq mi (29.8 km^{2})
  - Water: 0.23 sq mi (0.6 km^{2})
- Elevation: 4,524 ft (1,379 m)

Population (2020)
  - Total: 443
  - Density: 38.5/sq mi (14.9/km^{2})
- Time zone: UTC-7 (Mountain (MST))
  - Summer (DST): UTC-6 (MDT)
- ZIP code: 84660
- Area code: 801
- FIPS code: 49-57630
- GNIS feature ID: 1444167

Palmyra is a census-designated place (CDP) in Utah County, Utah, United States. It is part of the Provo–Orem Metropolitan Statistical Area. The population was 443 at the 2020 census. Palmyra is located directly west of Springville and northwest of Spanish Fork.

Palmyra was first settled in 1852.

== History ==
Palmyra, located seven miles south of Provo, was founded on the Spanish Fork River in 1852. The settlement was incorporated as a city by the Utah territorial legislature the following January. In March 1853, Stephen Markham was ordained a bishop and set apart to preside over the Palmyra LDS Ward. The town was eventually abandoned sometime in 1856, under the advice of Brigham Young. Most of the settlers located farther up the river, where the site of present-day Spanish Fork had been chosen and where a survey of a city had already been made. At the turn of the century, the area was resettled.

== Geography ==
According to the United States Census Bureau, the CDP has a total area of 11.7 square miles (30.4 km^{2}), of which 11.5 square miles (29.8 km^{2}) is land and 0.23 square miles (0.6 km^{2}), or 2.05%, is water.

== Demographics ==
Historical population
Census	Pop.	Note	%±
1940	262		—
1950	236		−9.9%
2000	485		—
2010	491		1.2%
2020	443		−9.8%
Source: U.S. Census Bureau

As of the census of 2000, there were 485 people, 142 households, and 123 families residing in the CDP. The population density was 42.2 people per square mile (16.3/km^{2}). There were 148 housing units at an average density of 12.9/sq mi (5.0/km^{2}). The racial makeup of the CDP was 97.53% White, 0.21% Native American, 2.06% Asian, 0.21% from other races. Hispanic or Latino of any race were 3.71% of the population.

There were 142 households, out of which 40.8% had children under the age of 18 living with them, 80.3% were married couples living together, 4.2% had a female householder with no husband present, and 12.7% were non-families. 12.0% of all households were made up of individuals, and 4.2% had someone living alone who was 65 years of age or older. The average household size was 3.42 and the average family size was 3.72.

In the CDP, the population was spread out, with 34.0% under the age of 18, 10.1% from 18 to 24, 23.5% from 25 to 44, 21.6% from 45 to 64, and 10.7% who were 65 years of age or older. The median age was 31 years. For every 100 females, there were 119.5 males. For every 100 females age 18 and over, there were 114.8 males.

The median income for a household in the CDP was $58,750, and the median income for a family was $90,122. Males had a median income of $42,917 versus $24,531 for females. The per capita income for the CDP was $18,967. About 5.8% of families and 8.5% of the population were below the poverty line, including 17.0% of those under age 18 and none of those age 65 or over.

== See also ==
- List of census-designated places in Utah
