= Sri Sri Radha Krishna Temple =

Radha Krishna temple in Utah, United States

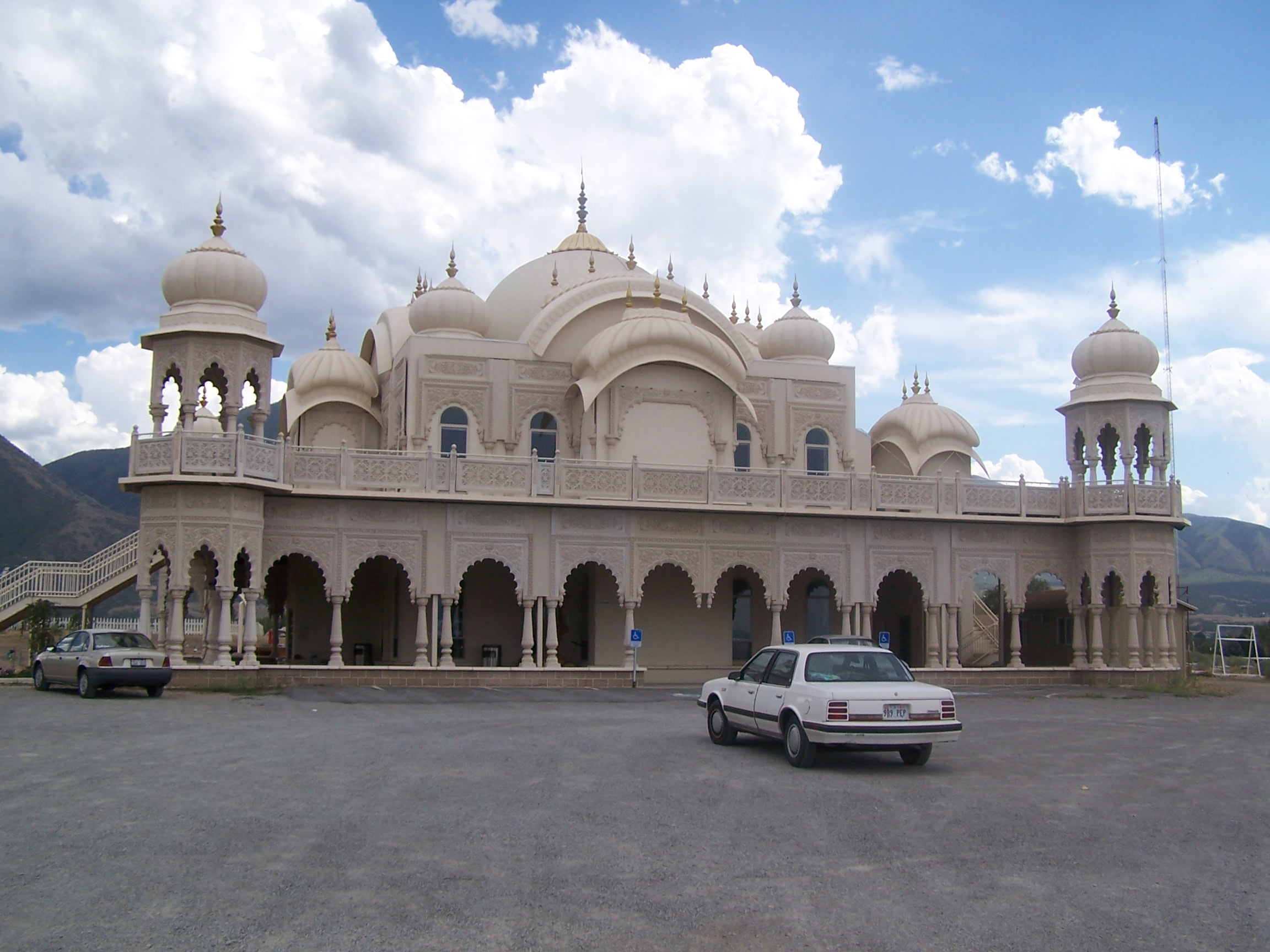
- The temple in August 2006

- Location in Utah Sri Sri Radha Krishna Temple (the United States)

Religion
- Affiliation: Hinduism
- Festivals: Holi in March, Llama Fest in July, Krishna Janmashtami in August, Diwali in October

Location
- Location: 311 W 8500 S, Spanish Fork, UT 84660
- Country: United States
- Coordinates: 40.075703°N 111.662122°W

Architecture
- Completed: 1998
- Temple: 1

Website
- www.utahkrishnas.org

The Sri Sri Radha Krishna Temple in Utah County, United States is a Hindu temple dedicated to Radha Krishna. It was built to meet the needs of the Hindu community in Utah County. The temple hosts many seasonal festivals, events and weekly services for prayer and meditation.

== History ==
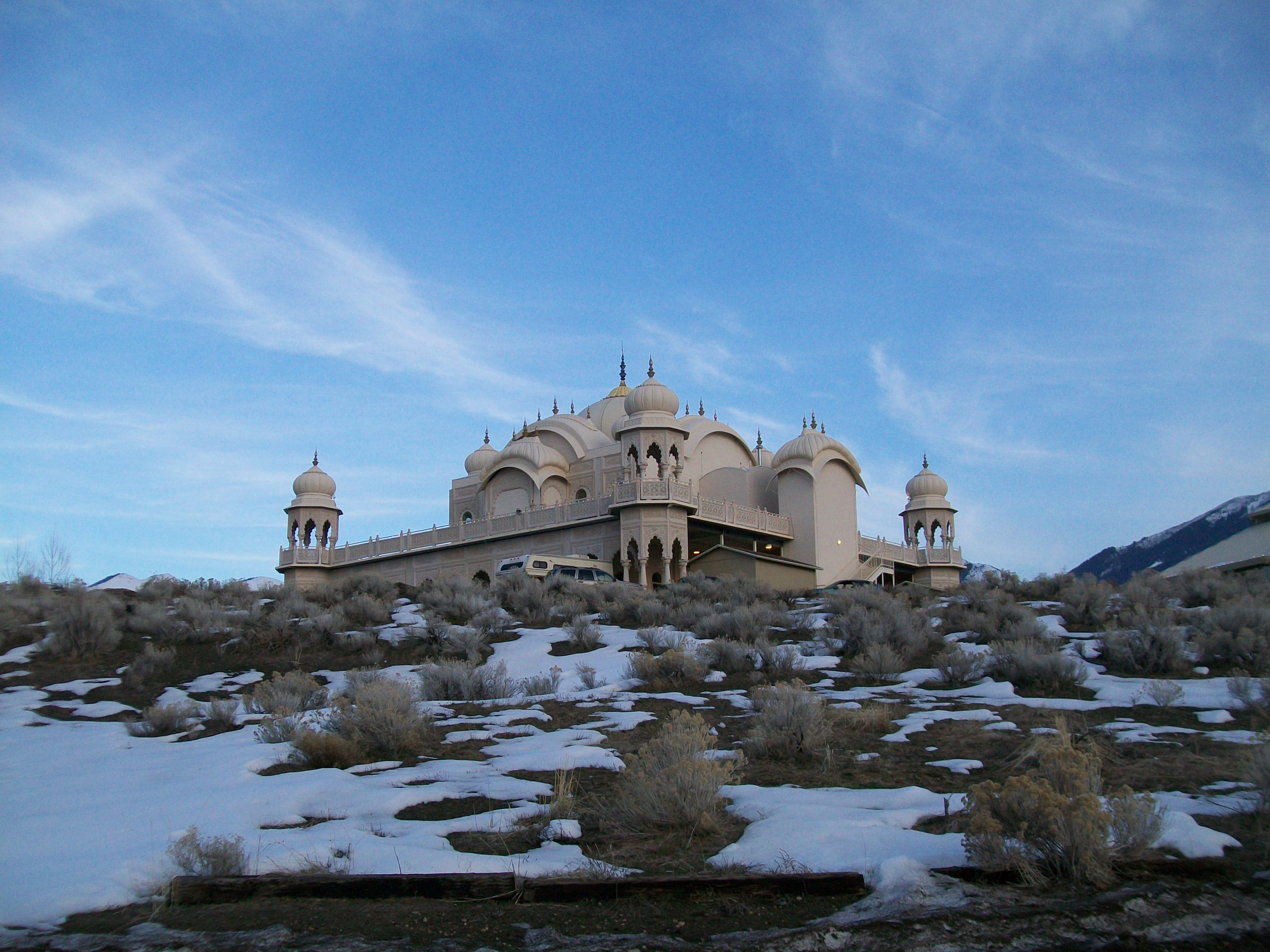
The Temple during winter, January 2008

The history behind the Sri Sri Radha Krishna temple is rooted in devoted members of the International Society for Krishna Consciousness (ISKCON) and their efforts to bring awareness of their religion and Indian culture to the wider world. The influence of this movement can be traced back thousands of years to the basic beliefs surrounding Krishna, and additionally to modern advocates for Krishna Consciousness like Swami Prabhupada.

The Sri Sri Radha Krishna temple is in existence mainly due to the efforts of Charu Das (formerly Christopher Warden) and his activity within ISKCON. Charu Das, an American by birth, left the United States in order to protest and avoid the Vietnam War. He then traveled through Europe, India, and Singapore. While in Singapore he met his future wife, Vaibhavi Dasi, and the two of them began a lifetime of work to further Krishna Consciousness. The two went to Australia, where they lived and worked for a time. After spending several years with a community of Krishna devotees, Charu left Australia and returned to the United States where he served in several positions for ISKCON.

Charu Das first visited Utah in 1975 when he traveled to Brigham Young University (BYU) to sell books for a trust under ISKCON. His impressions were positive, and he appreciated the atmosphere of tolerance and interest. In 1983, Charu Das left his residence in Los Angeles and moved to Spanish Fork, Utah. Vaibhavi das designed the temple, inspired by traditional architecture seen in India. On November 10, 1996, devotees organized a ground breaking ceremony to pay respect to Hindu deities. On February 16, 1998, the construction of the temple began.

The Sri Sri Radha Krishna temple continues to thrive each year as it attracts thousands of guests for both tours and seasonal festivals.

== Events and festivals ==
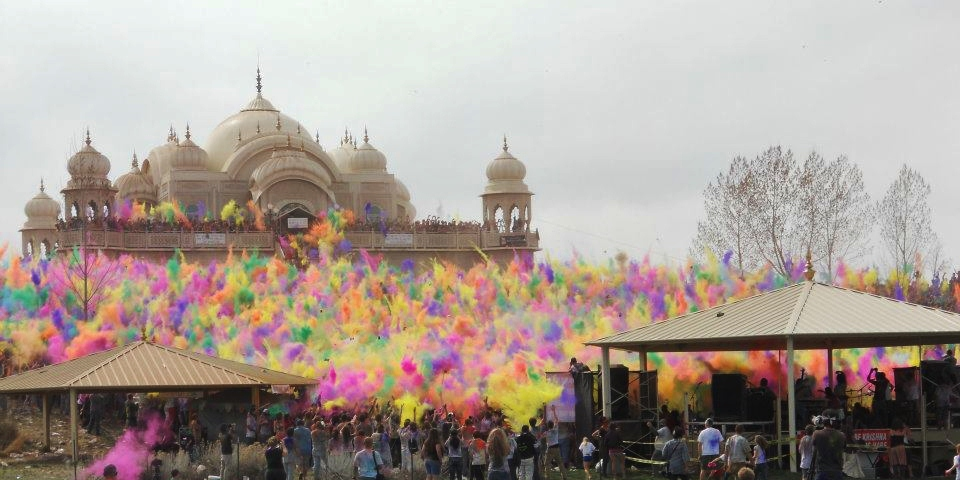
The Temple during the Festival of Colors, April 2012.

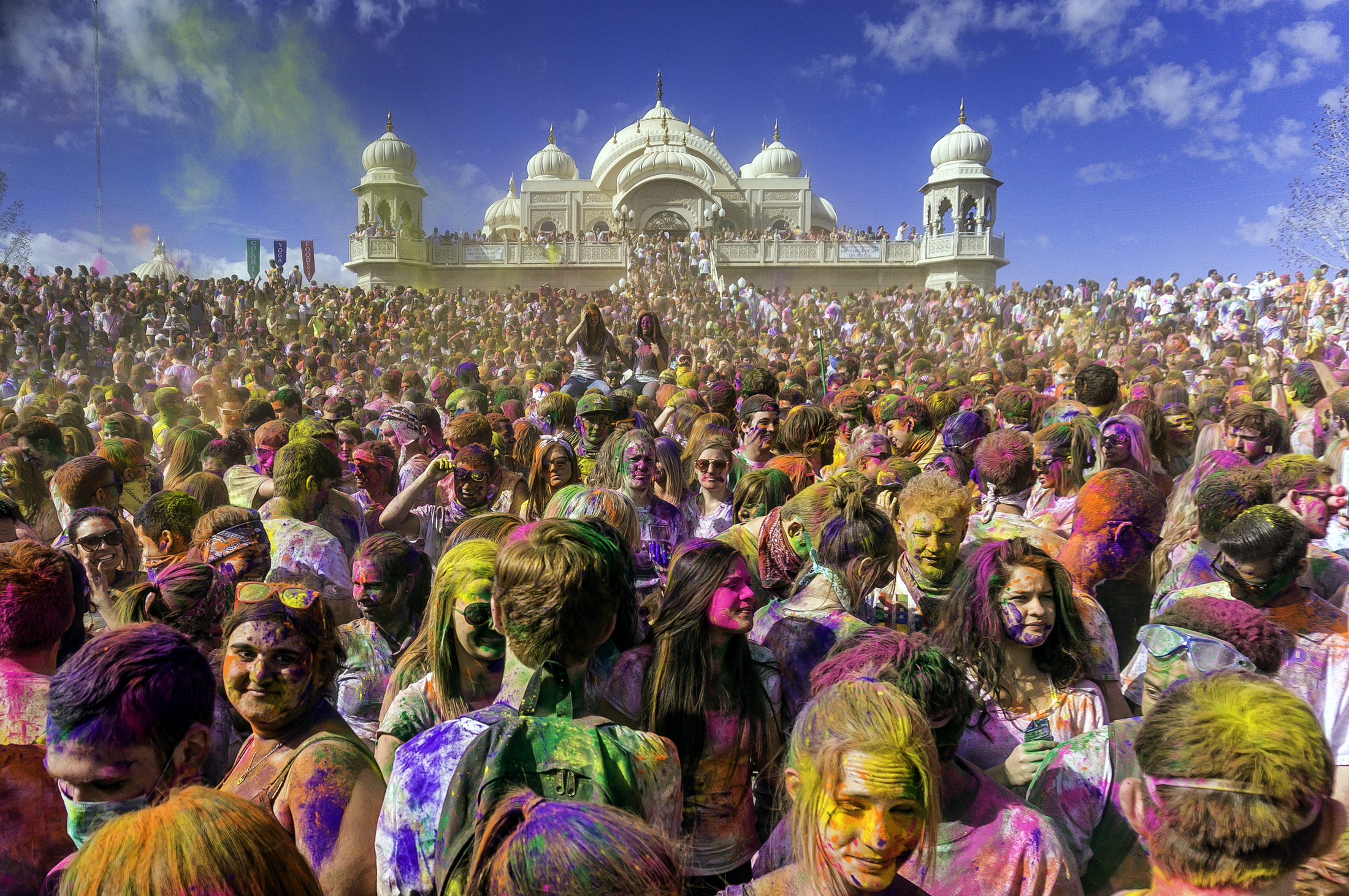
The Holi Festival in March 2013 at the Sri Sri Radha Krishna Temple in Utah County, Utah.

The temple houses a natural amphitheater with the capacity to accommodate thousands. From March through October the temple usually holds entertainments such as art and photography displays, tour guides, cuisine tasting, cultural exhibits on India, a gala pageant of the epic Ramayana, the burning of a 20-foot (6.1 m) high effigy of the demon Ravana, weddings and receptions, guided llama tours, and fireworks. There is a gift shop on site as well. There are many different visitors such as schools, scout troops, summer or senior organizations, and family reunions.

Annually, the biggest celebration in the Western Hemisphere of the Holi festival (also known as the Festival of Colors) is held here, typically teaching a Hindu message to a vast audience of diverse ages and religious backgrounds. Visitors can buy different colored powder (gulaal) imported from India, to throw at each other and into the air at specific times throughout the day, while live bands perform music. A replica of Holika the witch is burned in a bonfire.

== Weekly services ==
The services at the Krishna temple are open to the public every day from 10:00 am to 8:00 pm. A vegetarian buffet is offered each day, from noon to 6:00 P.M., at a price of $10 per adult and $5 per child. Other regular services are also held and are open to students.
