= Spanish Fork (river) =

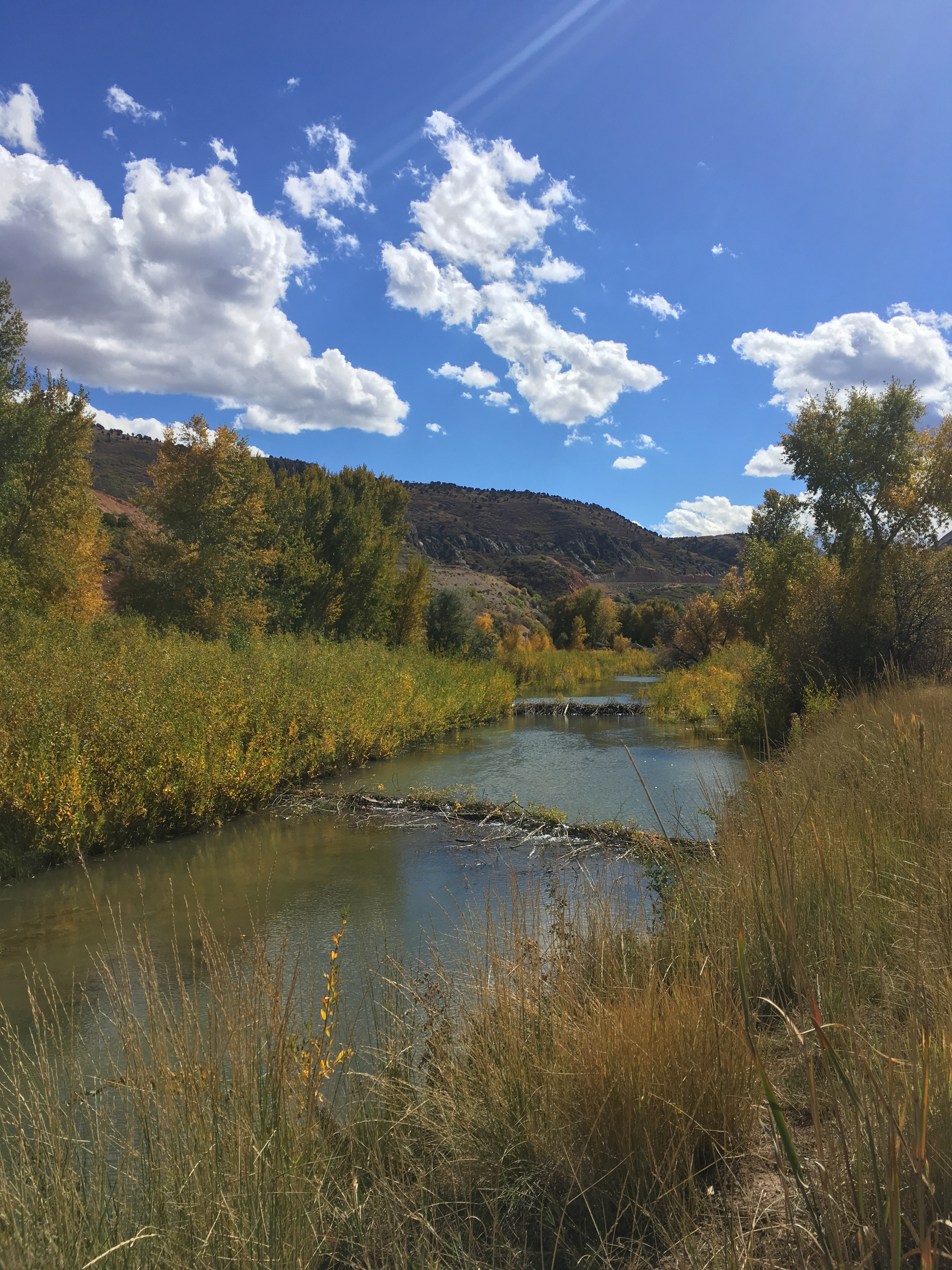
- Fall leaves along the Spanish Fork River

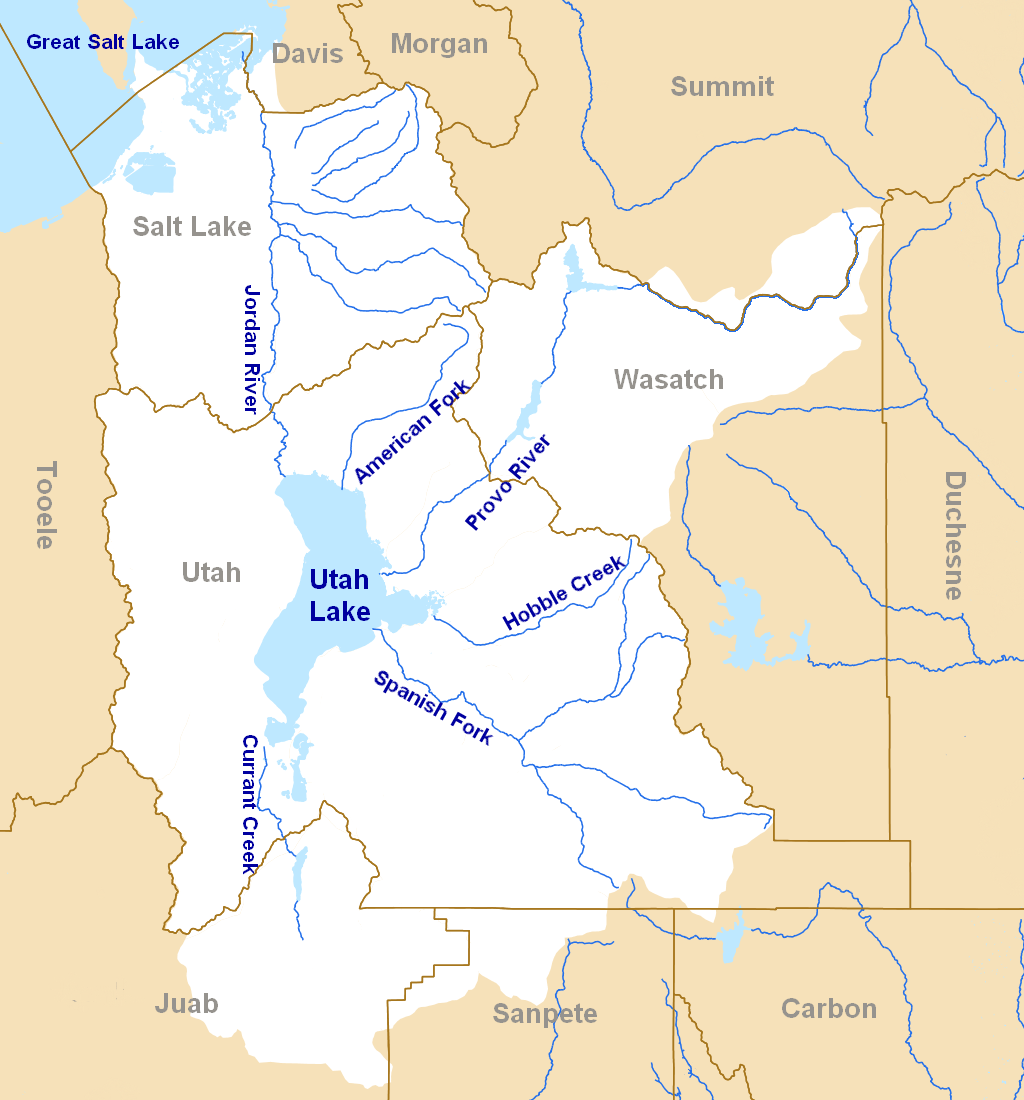
- Map of the Jordan River watershed, which includes the Spanish Fork

Location
- Country: United States
- State: Utah
- County: Utah County

Physical characteristics
- Source: Confluence of the Soldier and Thistle creeks
  - location: Spanish Fork Canyon
  - coordinates: 39°59′41″N 111°29′55″W
- Mouth: Utah Lake
  - location: Provo Bay
  - coordinates: 40°10′03″N 111°44′42″W
  - elevation: 4,495 ft (1,370 m)
- Length: 20 mi (32 km)
- Basin size: 675 sq mi (1,750 km^{2})
- Discharge
  - location: Castilla, Utah
  - average: 237 cu ft/s (6.7 m^{3}/s)
  - minimum: 20 cu ft/s (0.57 m^{3}/s)
  - maximum: 5,000 cu ft/s (140 m^{3}/s)

Basin features
- Tributaries
  - right: Diamond Fork

The Spanish Fork (often referred to as the Spanish Fork River) is a river in southeastern Utah County, Utah, United States.

== Description ==
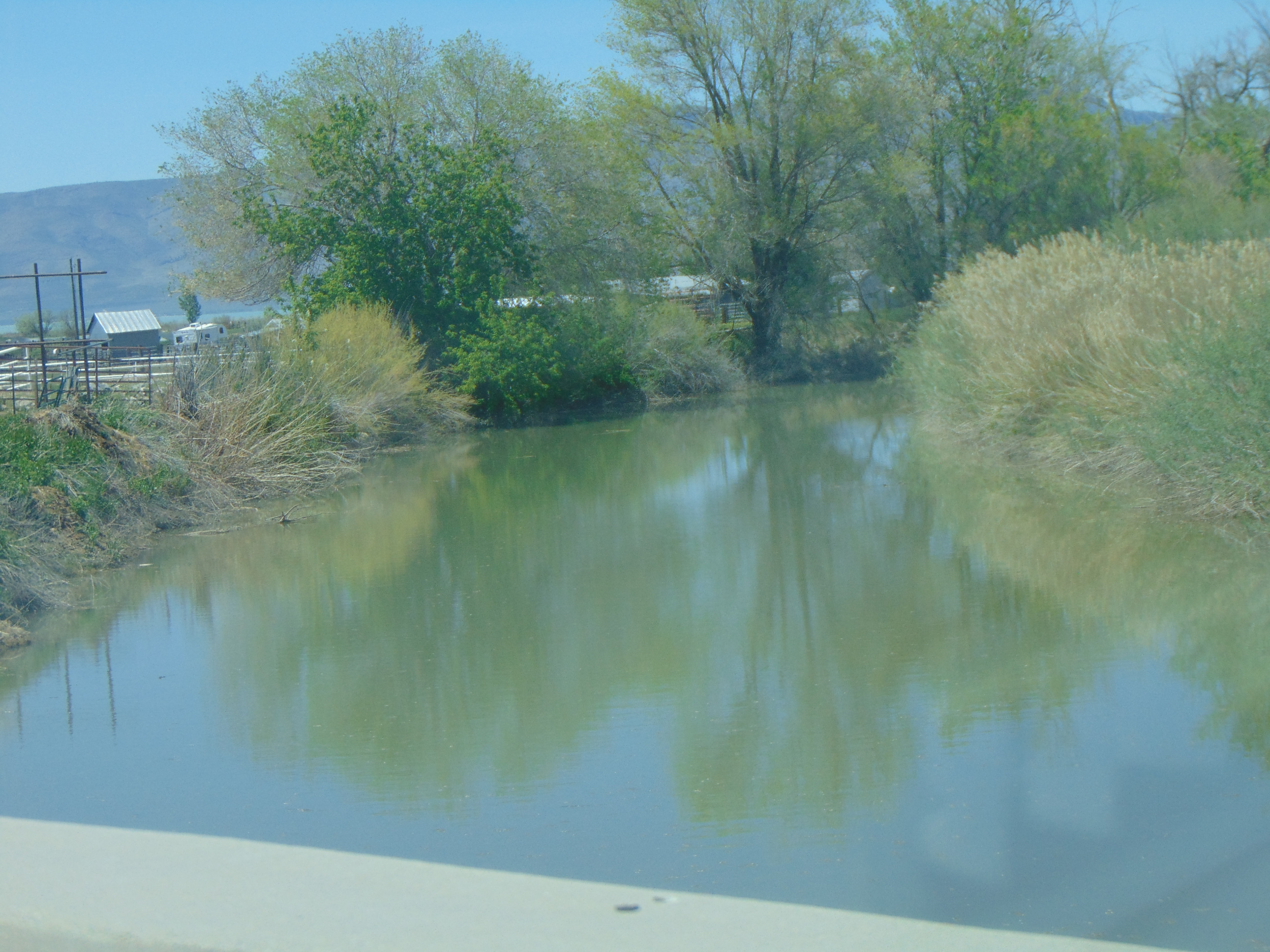
Looking north from Utah State Route 77 (West 4400 South) at the Spanish Fork, as it flows between Lake Shore and Palmyra, May 2016

Formed by the confluence of the Soldier and Thistle creeks in the now ghost town of Thistle (in Spanish Fork Canyon in the Wasatch Range), the river is fairly quickly joined by the Diamond Fork creek. The river then flows about 20 miles (32 km) northwest out of the canyon and into Utah Lake, passing through the city of Spanish Fork and then along the borders of the communities (and census-designated places) of Benjamin, Lake Shore, and Palmyra.

Located entirely in Utah County (though a small portion of its drainage basin extends into Carbon County), the Spanish Fork is heavily used for irrigation. The Spanish Fork area of Utah Valley has been intensively farmed since Mormons first settled the region in the 1860s. Still, as the amount of agricultural land grew, the river was no longer able to provide sufficient water except in years of heavy runoff. In 1909, the U.S. Bureau of Reclamation completed a tunnel to supplement the Spanish Fork's flow using water from the Strawberry River through the Strawberry Valley Project, part of the Central Utah Project. This diverted water is received via Spanish Fork's main tributary, the Diamond Fork.

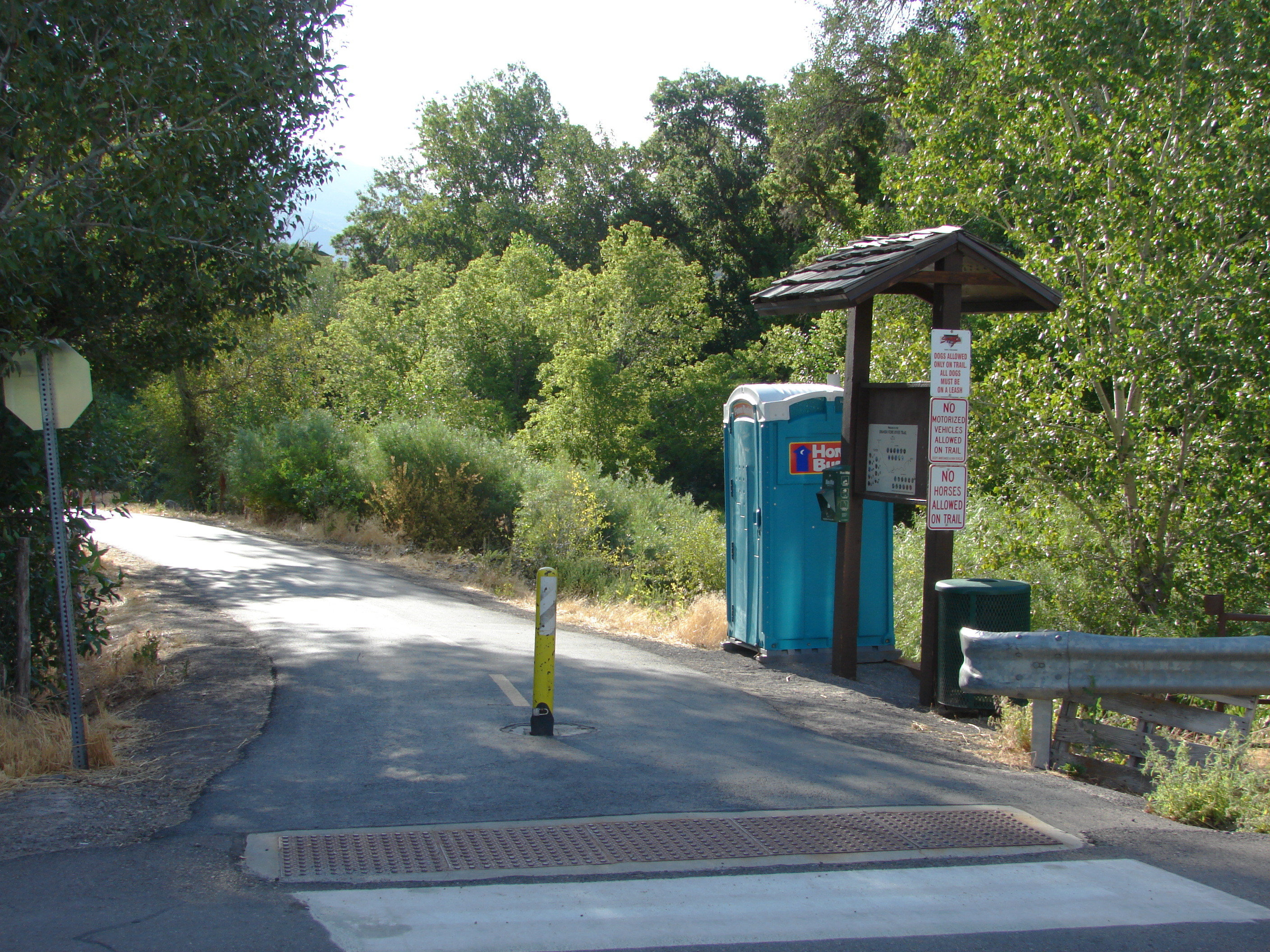
Looking east along the Spanish Fork River Trail from South 1100 East, July 2015

== Spanish Fork River Trail ==
A 7-mile (11 km), asphalt-paved parkway trail, for pedestrians and non-motorized vehicles, has been completed along the Spanish Fork. It begins near the mouth of Spanish Fork Canyon and runs roughly along the north bank of the river to a point near the western border of the city of Spanish Fork (just before the river passes under Utah State Route 115 and Interstate 15. The trail connects with the several other similar trails in the city of Spanish Fork and the river bottoms (the area south of Spanish Fork and the East Bench). One of these trails is the short 0.5 miles [0.80 km] Dripping Rock trail, which follows the river south from The Oaks at Spanish Fork golf course.

== Thistle landslide dam ==
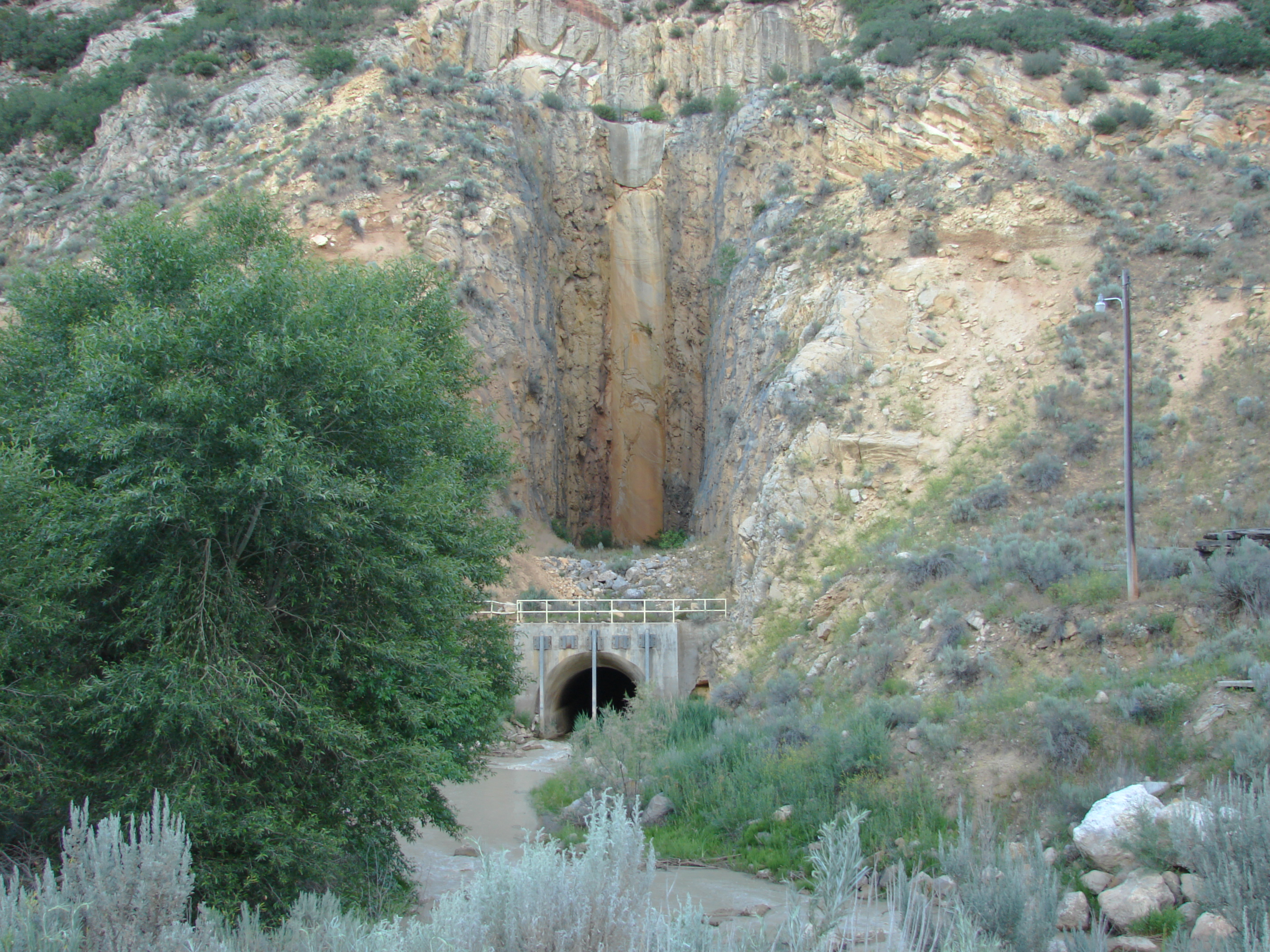
The Spanish Fork bypass tunnel intake, July 2015

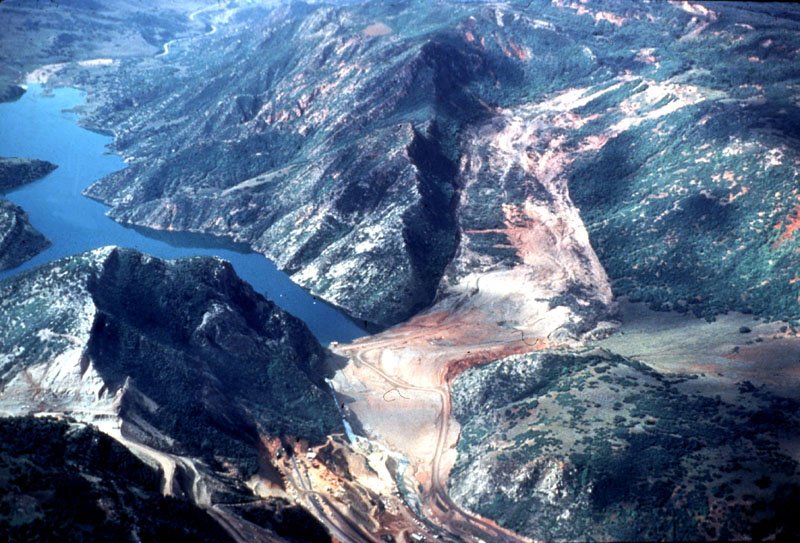
The temporary lake created by the 1983 Thistle landslide

In mid April 1983, the river was catastrophically dammed by a landslide to a height of 220 feet (67 m), just below its source in Thistle. Subsequently, a 3-mile (4.8 km) long reservoir (referred to as Thistle Lake) formed behind the barrier, drowning the town of Thistle, sections of U.S. Route-6 and U.S. Route-89, and the railroad lines through the canyon. Consideration was given to reinforcing the landslide dam and creating a permanent reservoir, which in some areas was up to 160 feet (49 m) deep. However, due to the instability of the landslide, this was not possible.

The reservoir lasted for five months before a bypass project was completed to drain the water through a tunnel. The tunnel runs through the solid bedrock of the canyon wall north of the landslide and the former course of the river. (Initially another tunnel, completed at a higher elevation, served as a spillway for the dam. Though no longer used, this spillway tunnel still exists.) Since the original watercourse is irrecoverable, the Spanish Fork still flows through the (lower, main) bypass tunnel. The landslide resulted in the first presidential (federal) disaster area declaration for the state of Utah. It is also considered one of the most costly landslides to ever to have occurred in the United States.

== See also ==
- List of rivers of Utah
