= Spanish Fork, Utah =

- City
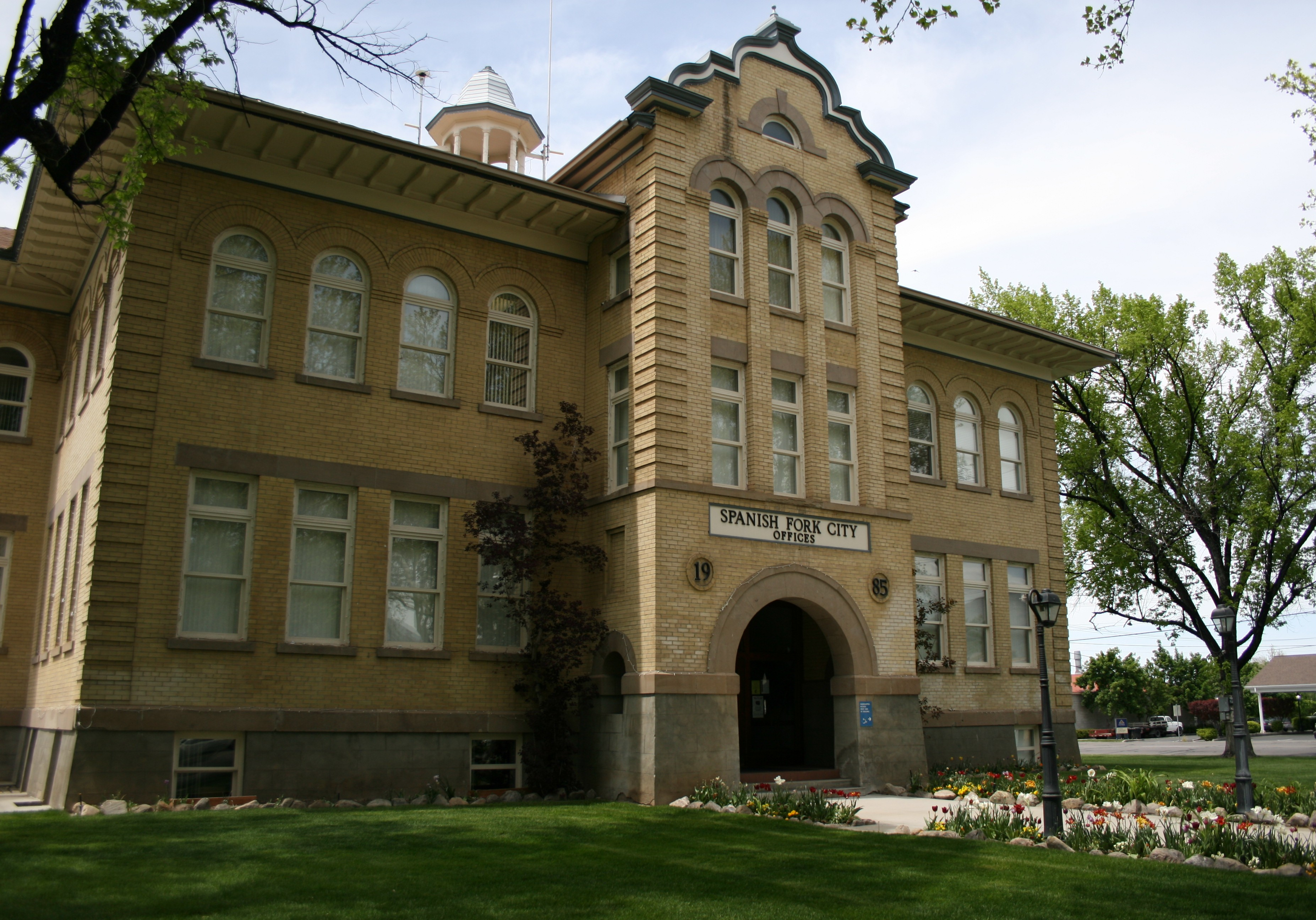
- Spanish Fork city offices
- Motto: "Pride and Progress"
- Location in Utah County and the state of Utah
- Coordinates: 40°06′54″N 111°38′18″W
- Country: United States
- State: Utah
- County: Utah
- Settled: 1851
- Incorporated: January 17, 1855
- Named for: Spanish Fork (river)

Area
  - Total: 16.21 sq mi (41.98 km^{2})
  - Land: 16.21 sq mi (41.98 km^{2})
  - Water: 0 sq mi (0.00 km^{2})
- Elevation: 4,666 ft (1,422 m)

Population (2020)
  - Total: 42,602
  - Density: 2,628/sq mi (1,015/km^{2})
- Time zone: UTC−7 (Mountain (MST))
  - Summer (DST): UTC−6 (MDT)
- ZIP Code: 84660
- Area codes: 385, 801
- FIPS code: 49-71290
- GNIS feature ID: 2411948
- Website: www.spanishfork.gov

Spanish Fork is a city in Utah County, Utah, United States. It is part of the Provo–Orem metropolitan area. The 2020 census reported a population of 42,602. Spanish Fork is the 20th largest city in Utah based on official 2017 estimates from the US Census Bureau.

Spanish Fork lies in the Utah Valley, with the Wasatch Range to the east and Utah Lake to the northwest. I-15 passes the northwest side of the city. Payson is approximately six miles to the southwest, Springville lies about four miles to the northeast, and Salem is approximately 4.5 miles to the south.

== History ==
Spanish Fork was settled in 1851 by members of the Church of Jesus Christ of Latter-day Saints as part of the Mormon Pioneers' settlement of Utah Territory. Its name derives from a visit to the area by two Franciscan friars from Spain, Silvestre Vélez de Escalante and Francisco Atanasio Domínguez in 1776, who followed the stream down Spanish Fork canyon with the objective of opening a new trail from Santa Fe, New Mexico, to the Spanish missions in California, along a route later followed by fur trappers. They described the area inhabited by Native Americans as having "spreading meadows, where there is sufficient irrigable land for two good settlements.... Over and above these finest of advantages, it has plenty of firewood and timber in the adjacent sierra which surrounds it—many sheltered spots, waters, and pasturages, for raising cattle and sheep and horses."

In 1851, some settlers led by William Pace set up scattered farms in the Spanish Fork bottom lands and called the area the Upper Settlement. However, a larger group congregated at what became known as the Lower Settlement just over a mile northwest of the present center of Spanish Fork along the Spanish Fork river. In December 1851, Stephen Markham, who was severely wounded outside Carthage Jail in Carthage, Illinois while attempting to defend Joseph Smith and other church leaders from a mob in 1844, became the president of the first church congregation (branch) at the Lower Settlement.

In 1852, Latter-day Saints founded a settlement called Palmyra west of the historic center of Spanish Fork. George A. Smith supervised the laying out of a townsite, including a temple square in that year. A fort and a school were built at the Palmyra site in 1852. With the onset of the Walker War in 1853, most of the farmers in the region who were not yet in the Palmyra fort moved in. Some of the people did not like this site and so moved to a different site at the mouth of Spanish Fork Canyon, where they built a structure they called "Fort St. Luke". Also in 1854 there was a fort founded approximately 2 miles (3.2 km) south of the center of Spanish Fork that later was known as the "Old Fort".

Between 1855 and 1860, the arrival of pioneers from Iceland made Spanish Fork the first permanent Icelandic settlement in the United States. The city also lent its name to the 1865 Treaty of Spanish Fork, where the Utes were forced by an Executive Order of President Abraham Lincoln to relocate to the Uintah Basin.

== Geography ==
=== Climate ===
Spanish Fork has a dry-summer continental climate (Köppen: Dsa) with cold, snowy winters and hot, dry summers.

Climate data for Spanish Fork Power House, Utah, 1991–2020 normals, extremes 1909–present
Month	Jan	Feb	Mar	Apr	May	Jun	Jul	Aug	Sep	Oct	Nov	Dec	Year
Record high °F (°C)	69 (21)	72 (22)	81 (27)	87 (31)	99 (37)	109 (43)	108 (42)	104 (40)	101 (38)	89 (32)	79 (26)	68 (20)	109 (43)
Mean maximum °F (°C)	51.1 (10.6)	59.6 (15.3)	71.9 (22.2)	80.2 (26.8)	88.9 (31.6)	97.0 (36.1)	100.1 (37.8)	97.8 (36.6)	91.9 (33.3)	81.7 (27.6)	66.7 (19.3)	53.7 (12.1)	101.1 (38.4)
Mean daily maximum °F (°C)	38.3 (3.5)	45.1 (7.3)	56.6 (13.7)	64.2 (17.9)	74.3 (23.5)	85.7 (29.8)	93.1 (33.9)	90.7 (32.6)	81.1 (27.3)	66.8 (19.3)	50.8 (10.4)	38.4 (3.6)	65.4 (18.6)
Daily mean °F (°C)	30.1 (−1.1)	35.4 (1.9)	44.7 (7.1)	51.1 (10.6)	60.0 (15.6)	69.5 (20.8)	77.1 (25.1)	75.2 (24.0)	66.0 (18.9)	53.7 (12.1)	40.9 (4.9)	30.6 (−0.8)	52.9 (11.6)
Mean daily minimum °F (°C)	22.0 (−5.6)	25.7 (−3.5)	32.7 (0.4)	37.9 (3.3)	45.6 (7.6)	53.3 (11.8)	61.1 (16.2)	59.7 (15.4)	50.9 (10.5)	40.5 (4.7)	31.0 (−0.6)	22.7 (−5.2)	40.3 (4.6)
Mean minimum °F (°C)	5.3 (−14.8)	9.7 (−12.4)	18.3 (−7.6)	25.7 (−3.5)	33.4 (0.8)	41.1 (5.1)	51.6 (10.9)	50.8 (10.4)	37.9 (3.3)	26.7 (−2.9)	13.9 (−10.1)	5.2 (−14.9)	0.8 (−17.3)
Record low °F (°C)	−16 (−27)	−20 (−29)	1 (−17)	10 (−12)	21 (−6)	29 (−2)	38 (3)	38 (3)	26 (−3)	8 (−13)	−6 (−21)	−19 (−28)	−20 (−29)
Average precipitation inches (mm)	2.11 (54)	2.08 (53)	2.16 (55)	2.47 (63)	2.11 (54)	0.97 (25)	0.57 (14)	0.74 (19)	1.40 (36)	1.81 (46)	1.80 (46)	1.97 (50)	20.19 (513)
Average snowfall inches (cm)	17.3 (44)	14.1 (36)	6.8 (17)	4.2 (11)	0.0 (0.0)	0.0 (0.0)	0.0 (0.0)	0.0 (0.0)	0.0 (0.0)	0.5 (1.3)	7.4 (19)	15.7 (40)	66.0 (168)
Average precipitation days (≥ 0.01 in)	9.9	9.5	9.3	10.8	8.8	4.9	3.8	5.4	6.1	7.1	8.1	9.8	93.5
Average snowy days (≥ 0.1 in)	6.5	5.2	2.9	1.9	0.0	0.0	0.0	0.0	0.0	0.3	3.3	6.7	26.8
Source: NOAA

== Demographics ==
Historical population
Census	Pop.	Note	%±
1860	773		—
1870	1,450		87.6%
1880	2,304		58.9%
1890	2,686		16.6%
1900	3,327		23.9%
1910	3,751		12.7%
1920	4,035		7.6%
1930	3,727		−7.6%
1940	4,167		11.8%
1950	5,230		25.5%
1960	6,472		23.7%
1970	7,284		12.5%
1980	9,825		34.9%
1990	11,272		14.7%
2000	20,246		79.6%
2010	34,691		71.3%
2020	42,602		22.8%
U.S. Decennial Census

=== 2020 census ===
As of the 2020 census, Spanish Fork had a population of 42,602. The median age was 27.3 years. 37.1% of residents were under the age of 18 and 7.5% of residents were 65 years of age or older. For every 100 females there were 101.0 males, and for every 100 females age 18 and over there were 98.2 males age 18 and over.

99.3% of residents lived in urban areas, while 0.7% lived in rural areas.

There were 11,379 households in Spanish Fork, of which 56.4% had children under the age of 18 living in them. Of all households, 72.6% were married-couple households, 9.0% were households with a male householder and no spouse or partner present, and 15.6% were households with a female householder and no spouse or partner present. About 10.9% of all households were made up of individuals and 4.9% had someone living alone who was 65 years of age or older.

There were 11,676 housing units, of which 2.5% were vacant. The homeowner vacancy rate was 0.6% and the rental vacancy rate was 4.5%.

Racial composition as of the 2020 census
Race	Number	Percent
White	35,452	83.2%
Black or African American	219	0.5%
American Indian and Alaska Native	288	0.7%
Asian	252	0.6%
Native Hawaiian and Other Pacific Islander	324	0.8%
Some other race	2,449	5.7%
Two or more races	3,618	8.5%
Hispanic or Latino (of any race)	5,929	13.9%

=== 2010 census ===
As of the 2010 census, there were 34,691 people, 9,069 households, and 7,885 families residing in the city. The population density was 2,252.7 people per square mile (871.6/km^{2}). There were 9,440 housing units, at an average density of 613.0 per square mile (237.2/km^{2}).

The ethnical makeup of the city was 90.9% European American, 0.4% African American, 0.5% Native American, 0.6% Asian, 0.7% Pacific Islander, 4.4% some other ethnicity, and 2.5% from two or more ethnicities. Hispanic or Latino of any ethnicity were 10.6% of the population.

The population was quite young with 40.9% being under the age of 18, 53.6% aged 18–64 and 5.5% over the age of 65.

=== 2000 census ===
As of the 2000 census, the median income for a household in the city was $62,805, and the median income for a family was $64,909. The per capita income for the city was $17,162. About 4.3% of families and 6.2% of the population were below the poverty line.

== Economy ==
Mountain Country Foods is currently Spanish Fork's largest private employer with 350 employees. Eight other businesses employ one hundred or more workers: SAPA, Klune Industries, Longview Fibre, Nature's Sunshine, Rocky Mountain Composites, J.C. Penney, Western Wats, and Provo Craft.

Spanish Fork has a predominantly LDS population. There are seventy-four LDS wards in nine stakes in the southern Utah Valley and a temple, the Payson Utah Temple, which opened in June 2015. The majority of residents are Members of The Church of Jesus Christ of Latter-day Saints just like all of Utah County.

There are other churches in town: the Presbyterian Church established a church and mission day school in 1882. The school functioned until the state school system was inaugurated in the early part of the twentieth century. Today there are nine public elementary schools, two intermediate, and two high schools of the Nebo School District.

A Lutheran church, established by immigrants from Iceland, was built on the east bench of Spanish Fork. There is also the Faith Baptist Church, a Baptist congregation.

A Roman Catholic church serves the Catholics of southern Utah Valley; many happen to be of Italian descent (see Utah Italians), Hispanics, Filipino Americans, and some Greek Catholics from the Balkans.

ISKCON (International Society for Krishna Consciousness) have built a temple in Spanish Fork, run by Caru Das, the temple priest. Indian Americans form a small but noticeable community in the Spanish Fork-Provo area (especially in the neighboring town of Springville).

In Utah Valley's historical settlement by immigrants, Scandinavians (most notably Icelanders); as well as Swiss people; Spanish Americans, Hispanics or Latinos; English Americans, Irish Americans and Scottish Americans are prevalent ethnocultural groups in Spanish Fork, and the nearby towns of Salem and Payson.

== Arts and culture ==
=== Sights ===
The Angelus Theatre in Spanish Fork hosts live shows, collaborating with theater companies including Great Hall Theatrical Experiences andCobb&Co, and other events such as live music or rock bands.

=== Events ===
Spanish Fork City hosts five large-scale events each year: Fiesta Days, Icelandic Days, the Harvest Moon Hurrah, the Festival of Lights, and the Festival of Colors.

==== Icelandic Days ====
The Icelandic Association of Utah was founded in 1897 and hosts Iceland Days every year. The association picked June because Icelandic Independence Day, or National Day, is June 17.

Spanish Fork was the first Icelandic settlement in the United States, after Icelanders who joined the Church of Jesus Christ were expelled from that country, according to association spokesman Glenn Grossman. Although other nationalities helped found the town, under colonizer Brigham Young, Icelanders kept their identity and celebrate it with their culture every year during the three-day event.

==== Harvest Moon Hurrah ====
The Harvest Moon Hurrah is sponsored by the Spanish Fork Arts Council and takes place on a Saturday in September closest to the date of the full moon. Activities include children's crafts and activities, a giant paint-it-yourself mural, storyteller, old-fashioned family photos, caricature artist, clown and balloon animals, hay rides with live bluegrass band, and live entertainment. The 2009 Hurrah was headlined by Peter Breinholt, a local musician.

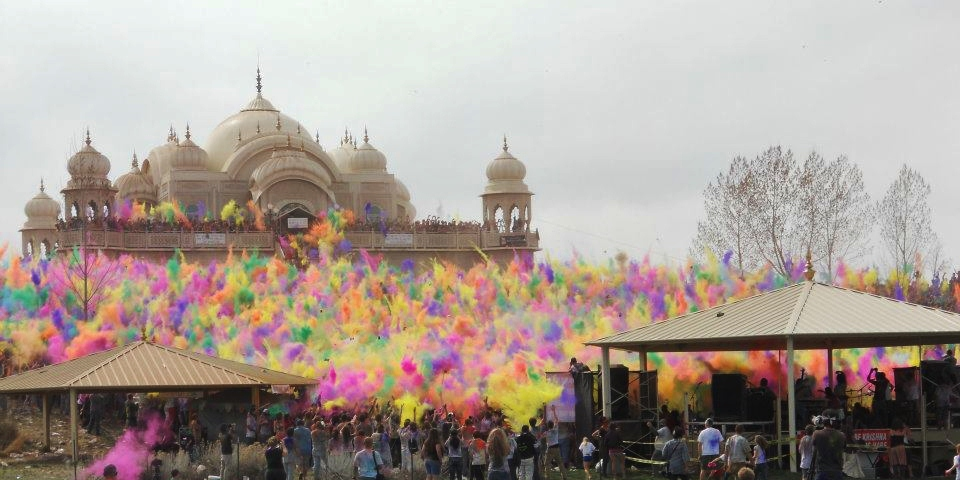
Festival of Colors at the Sri Sri Radha Krishna Temple in Spanish Fork

==== Festival of Colors ====
The Sri Sri Radha Krishna Temple (erected by Christopher Warden, an International Society for Krishna Consciousness follower) celebrates Holi and is known for the Festival of Colors where thousands of people gather from all over the country.

==== Fiesta Days ====
Each year Spanish Fork hosts the "Fiesta Days". The event is held every July, and is centered around the Pioneer Day Celebration. There are a number of entertainment events, including a rodeo, craft fair, parade, duck race, and a fireworks show on the 24th.

== Government ==
Spanish Fork has a council-manager form of government.

== Education ==
In 1862, Spanish Fork built its first school house. That one room edifice served the city's educational needs for nearly 50 years. In 1910, Spanish Fork built the Thurber School on Main Street. Although it's not used for daily K-12 classes anymore, it still functions as a city office building. Today, Spanish Fork is served by the Nebo School District. Public schools in this district within Spanish Fork include the following:

- Spanish Fork High School
- Maple Mountain High School
- Landmark High School (alternative school)
- Spanish Fork Junior High School
- Diamond Fork Middle School (formerly known as Diamond Fork Junior High School)
- Brockbank Elementary
- Canyon Elementary
- Larsen Elementary
- Park Elementary
- Rees Elementary
- Riverview Elementary School
- East Meadows Elementary
- Sierra Bonita Elementary
- Maple Ridge Elementary

In addition, there is a private girls school, the New Haven School, and a K-12 charter school, the American Leadership Academy.

== Infrastructure ==
=== Alternative energy ===
In September 2008, the Spanish Fork Wind Project was completed. This project, a 9-turbine wind energy project, can produce up to 18.9 megawatts at full production, and the nine turbines can power up to 6,000 typical homes. It is a utility-scale wind farm producing electricity from wind power.

== Notable people ==
- Isaac Asiata, football player
- D. Elden Beck, educator
- Scott Brumfield, football player
- Kate B. Carter, Utah pioneer historian
- Zebedee Coltrin, Utah pioneer
- Spencer Fano, football player
- Kaycee Feild, bareback bronc rider
- Jaren Hall, football player
- Gail Halvorsen, U.S. Air Force candy bomber
- Ab Jenkins, politician and racing driver
- Lucky Blue Smith, fashion model
- Stephen M. Studdert, advisor to three U.S. Presidents
- Hefa Leone Tuita, dancer

== See also ==
- List of cities and towns in Utah
- Icelandic heritage in Spanish Fork, Utah
