= National Register of Historic Places listings in Bear Lake County, Idaho =

Location of Bear Lake County in Idaho

This is a list of the National Register of Historic Places listings in Bear Lake County, Idaho.

This is intended to be a complete list of the properties and districts on the National Register of Historic Places in Bear Lake County, Idaho, United States. Latitude and longitude coordinates are provided for many National Register properties and districts; these locations may be seen together in a map.

There are 92 properties and districts listed on the National Register in the county. More may be added; properties and districts nationwide are added to the Register weekly.

This National Park Service list is complete through NPS recent listings posted July 10, 2026.

== Current listings ==
	Name on the Register	Image	Date listed	Location	City or town	Description
1	Ezra Allred Bungalow	Ezra Allred Bungalow	November 18, 1982 (#82000258)	95 W. Center St. 42°13′36″N 111°24′13″W	Paris	
2	Ezra Allred Cottage	Ezra Allred Cottage	November 18, 1982 (#82000259)	159 N. Main St. 42°13′49″N 111°24′05″W	Paris	
3	Dr. George Ashley House	Dr. George Ashley House	November 18, 1982 (#82000261)	40 W. 2nd North; 42°13′53″N 111°24′08″W	Paris	
4	George Ashley Sr. House		November 18, 1982 (#82000260)	W. 2nd North; 42°13′53″N 111°24′11″W	Paris	
5	Sam Athay House	Sam Athay House	November 18, 1982 (#82004939)	20 W. 2nd North; 42°13′53″N 111°24′07″W	Paris	
6	John A. Bagley House	John A. Bagley House	January 20, 1978 (#78001046)	155 N. 5th St. 42°19′08″N 111°18′05″W	Montpelier	
7	Bear Lake County Courthouse	Bear Lake County Courthouse	October 7, 1977 (#77000454)	7 E. Center St. 42°13′38″N 111°24′02″W	Paris	Demolished in 2021
8	Bear Lake Market	Bear Lake Market	November 18, 1982 (#82000262)	5 N. Main St. 42°13′38″N 111°24′05″W	Paris	
9	Bear Lake Stake Tabernacle	Bear Lake Stake Tabernacle	December 8, 1972 (#72000436)	109 S. Main St. 42°13′33″N 111°24′01″W	Paris	
10	Beck Barns and Automobile Storage	Beck Barns and Automobile Storage	November 18, 1982 (#82000263)	Center St. 42°13′35″N 111°24′09″W	Paris	
11	Bishop West Barn		November 18, 1982 (#82000264)	W. 2nd South; 42°13′20″N 111°24′13″W	Paris	
12	Browning Block	Browning Block	November 18, 1982 (#82000265)	Main and Center Sts. 42°13′36″N 111°24′05″W	Paris	
13	Budge Cottage		November 18, 1982 (#82000266)	Center St. 42°13′38″N 111°24′17″W	Paris	
14	Alfred Budge House	Alfred Budge House	November 18, 1982 (#82000267)	N. 1st West at W. 1st North; 42°13′43″N 111°24′17″W	Paris	
15	Julia Budge House		November 18, 1982 (#82000268)	57 W. 1st North; 42°13′44″N 111°24′10″W	Paris	
16	Taft Budge Bungalow	Taft Budge Bungalow	April 13, 1983 (#83000260)	86 W. Center St. 42°13′38″N 111°24′12″W	Paris	
17	Russell Clayton Bungalow	Russell Clayton Bungalow	April 13, 1983 (#83000261)	147 E. Center St. 42°13′38″N 111°23′49″W	Paris	
18	Cole House	Cole House	November 18, 1982 (#82000269)	Southwest of Paris; 42°13′00″N 111°24′37″W	Paris	
19	James Collings Jr. House	James Collings Jr. House	November 18, 1982 (#82001888)	South of Paris on U.S. Route 89; 42°12′48″N 111°24′02″W	Paris	
20	Joseph Cook House	Joseph Cook House	November 18, 1982 (#82000270)	63 W. 2nd South; 42°13′20″N 111°24′11″W	Paris	
21	E. F. Davis House	E. F. Davis House	November 18, 1982 (#82000271)	10 W. 2nd North; 42°13′53″N 111°24′06″W	Paris	
22	Georgetown Relief Society Hall	Georgetown Relief Society Hall	September 18, 1998 (#98001171)	161 W. 3rd St. 42°28′28″N 111°22′16″W	Georgetown	
23	John Grimmett Jr. House and Outbuildings	John Grimmett Jr. House and Outbuildings	April 13, 1983 (#83000262)	135 W. 2nd North; 42°13′51″N 111°24′17″W	Paris	
24	Orson Grimmett Bungalow	Orson Grimmett Bungalow	April 13, 1983 (#83000263)	28 W. 2nd North; 42°13′51″N 111°24′17″W	Paris	
25	Grunder Cabin and Outbuildings	Grunder Cabin and Outbuildings	November 18, 1982 (#82000272)	E. 1st North; 42°13′46″N 111°23′35″W	Paris	
26	Hoffman Barn	Hoffman Barn	November 18, 1982 (#82000273)	N. 2nd East; 42°13′48″N 111°23′39″W	Paris	
27	Walter Hoge House	Walter Hoge House	November 18, 1982 (#82000274)	Center and N. 1st East; 42°13′38″N 111°23′54″W	Paris	
28	Hotel Paris	Hotel Paris	November 18, 1982 (#82000275)	7 S. Main St. 42°13′36″N 111°24′03″W	Paris	
29	Amos Hulme Barn	Amos Hulme Barn	November 18, 1982 (#82000276)	N. 1st East; 42°13′47″N 111°23′55″W	Paris	
30	Kate Innes House		April 13, 1983 (#83000264)	100 E. 2nd South; 42°13′20″N 111°23′51″W	Paris	
31	Thomas Innes House	Thomas Innes House	November 18, 1982 (#82000277)	42 W. 1st South; 42°13′30″N 111°24′08″W	Paris	
32	Jaussi Bungalow	Jaussi Bungalow	November 18, 1982 (#82000278)	170 E. 2nd North; 42°13′51″N 111°23′46″W	Paris	
33	Keller House and Derrick	Keller House and Derrick	November 18, 1982 (#82001889)	E. 1st North; 42°13′43″N 111°23′41″W	Paris	
34	Robert Kelsey Bungalow	Robert Kelsey Bungalow	April 13, 1983 (#83000265)	24 E. 2nd South; 42°13′20″N 111°24′01″W	Paris	
35	Latham Bungalow	Latham Bungalow	April 13, 1983 (#83000266)	152 S. 1st East; 42°13′26″N 111°23′55″W	Paris	
36	Oren Law House and Outbuildings		November 18, 1982 (#82000281)	592 N. Main St. 42°14′28″N 111°23′59″W	Paris	
37	LDS Seminary	LDS Seminary	November 18, 1982 (#82000279)	Tabernacle Block; 42°13′34″N 111°23′59″W	Paris	
38	LDS Stake Office Building	LDS Stake Office Building	November 18, 1982 (#82000280)	62 S. Main St. 42°13′32″N 111°24′05″W	Paris	
39	Lewis Barn		November 18, 1982 (#82000282)	W. 2nd North; 42°13′52″N 111°24′19″W	Paris	
40	Lewis Bungalow	Lewis Bungalow	April 13, 1983 (#83000267)	W. 2nd North; 42°13′53″N 111°24′21″W	Paris	
41	Fred Lewis Cottage	Fred Lewis Cottage	April 13, 1983 (#83000268)	192 W. 2nd North; 42°13′53″N 111°24′23″W	Paris	
42	J.L. Linvall House and Outbuilding	J.L. Linvall House and Outbuilding	November 18, 1982 (#82000283)	E. 2nd South; 42°13′22″N 111°23′40″W	Paris	
43	Robb Linvall House		November 18, 1982 (#82000284)	Paris Canyon Rd. 42°13′19″N 111°24′37″W	Paris	
44	Morris Low Bungalow	Morris Low Bungalow	November 18, 1982 (#82000285)	48 W. Center St. 42°13′38″N 111°24′09″W	Paris	
45	Montpelier Historic District	Montpelier Historic District	November 16, 1978 (#78001047)	Washington Ave. and 6th St. 42°19′03″N 111°18′10″W	Montpelier	Four buildings: a high school, its gymnasium, the city hall, and an LDS church
46	Montpelier Odd Fellows Hall	Montpelier Odd Fellows Hall	April 15, 1978 (#78001048)	843 Washington St. 42°19′03″N 111°18′29″W	Montpelier	
47	Wilhelmina Nelson House and Cabins		May 3, 1976 (#76000668)	U.S. Route 89; 42°06′36″N 111°23′15″W	St. Charles	
48	James Nye House	James Nye House	April 13, 1983 (#83000269)	52 E. 1st South; 42°13′28″N 111°23′59″W	Paris	
49	Old LDS Tithing/Paris Post Building	Old LDS Tithing/Paris Post Building	November 18, 1982 (#82000286)	58 S. Main St. 42°13′32″N 111°24′05″W	Paris	
50	Paris Cemetery	Paris Cemetery	November 18, 1982 (#82000287)	South of Paris, west of U.S. Route 89; 42°12′48″N 111°24′25″W	Paris	
51	Paris Lumber Company Building	Paris Lumber Company Building	November 18, 1982 (#82000288)	Main St. 42°13′23″N 111°24′05″W	Paris	
52	Paris Photo Studio		November 18, 1982 (#82000289)	W. Center St. 42°13′36″N 111°24′05″W	Paris	Formerly attached to the west side of the Browning Block, this building is no longer standing.
53	Paris Public School		November 18, 1982 (#82000290)	Main and 1st North Sts. 42°13′44″N 111°24′03″W	Paris	Demolished
54	Pendrey Drug Store Building	Pendrey Drug Store Building	November 18, 1982 (#82000291)	Main and Center Sts. 42°13′37″N 111°24′05″W	Paris	
55	Arthur Pendrey Cottage	Arthur Pendrey Cottage	November 18, 1982 (#82004938)	193 N. Main St. 42°13′51″N 111°24′05″W	Paris	
56	Joe and Zina Pendrey Bungalow	Joe and Zina Pendrey Bungalow	April 13, 1983 (#83000270)	49 N. Main St. 42°13′40″N 111°24′05″W	Paris	
57	Jim Poulson House	Jim Poulson House	November 18, 1982 (#82000292)	146 E. 1st North; 42°13′44″N 111°23′48″W	Paris	
58	Preston Bungalow	Preston Bungalow	April 13, 1983 (#83000271)	42 W. Center St. 42°13′38″N 111°24′08″W	Paris	
59	Dan Price House	Dan Price House	November 18, 1982 (#82000293)	88 W. 1st North; 42°13′46″N 111°24′12″W	Paris	
60	Fred Price Bungalow	Fred Price Bungalow	April 13, 1983 (#83000272)	125 N. 1st West; 42°13′47″N 111°24′16″W	Paris	
61	Herber Price Bungalow	Herber Price Bungalow	April 13, 1983 (#83000273)	60 W. 1st North; 42°13′46″N 111°24′09″W	Paris	
62	Joe Price House	Joe Price House	November 18, 1982 (#82000294)	W. 1st North; 42°13′46″N 111°24′07″W	Paris	
63	Robert Price House	Robert Price House	November 18, 1982 (#82000295)	N. 1st West at W. 1st North; 42°13′46″N 111°24′16″W	Paris	
64	William and Nora Ream House	William and Nora Ream House	April 26, 1991 (#91000460)	Dingle Rd. south of Ream Crockett Canal; 42°12′09″N 111°15′58″W	Dingle	
65	Joseph Rich Barn	Joseph Rich Barn	November 18, 1982 (#82004940)	W. 2nd South; 42°13′23″N 111°24′07″W	Paris	Only a portion of the building remains.
66	Landon Rich House	Landon Rich House	November 18, 1982 (#82000297)	W. 1st South; 42°13′31″N 111°24′26″W	Paris	
67	William L. Rich House	William L. Rich House	November 18, 1982 (#82000298)	34 W. 2nd South; 42°13′22″N 111°24′09″W	Paris	
68	Rich-Grandy Cabin	Rich-Grandy Cabin	November 18, 1982 (#82000296)	31 E. 2nd South; 42°13′22″N 111°24′01″W	Paris	
69	Franklin Rogers Bungalow	Franklin Rogers Bungalow	November 18, 1982 (#82000299)	55 E. Center St. 42°13′38″N 111°23′58″W	Paris	
70	Frederick Rogers House	Frederick Rogers House	November 18, 1982 (#82000300)	245 W. 2nd North; 42°13′51″N 111°24′28″W	Paris	
71	Anna Nielsen Scofield House	Anna Nielsen Scofield House	April 1, 1999 (#99000417)	2788 U.S. Route 89; 42°02′20″N 111°23′43″W	Fish Haven	
72	John Sheidigger House and Outbuildings		November 18, 1982 (#82000303)	South of Paris on U.S. Route 89; 42°13′01″N 111°24′02″W	Paris	
73	Shepherd Bungalow	Shepherd Bungalow	April 13, 1983 (#83000274)	55 W. 1st North; 42°13′43″N 111°24′09″W	Paris	
74	Shepherd Hardware		November 18, 1982 (#82000304)	13 N. Main St. 42°13′38″N 111°24′05″W	Paris	This building is no longer standing.
75	Earl Shepherd Bungalow	Earl Shepherd Bungalow	November 18, 1982 (#82000301)	104 W. Center St. 42°13′38″N 111°24′15″W	Paris	
76	J. R. Shepherd House	J. R. Shepherd House	November 18, 1982 (#82000305)	58 W. Center St. 42°13′38″N 111°24′10″W	Paris	
77	Les and Hazel Shepherd Bungalow	Les and Hazel Shepherd Bungalow	November 18, 1982 (#82000306)	185 N. Main St. 42°13′51″N 111°24′05″W	Paris	
78	Ted Shepherd Cottage	Ted Shepherd Cottage	November 18, 1982 (#82000302)	N. 1st West; 42°13′42″N 111°24′16″W	Paris	
79	Thomas Sleight Cabin	Thomas Sleight Cabin	November 18, 1982 (#82000307)	approximately 150 S. Main St. 42°13′25″N 111°24′06″W	Paris	
80	Thomas Smedley House		November 18, 1982 (#82000308)	E. 1st North; 42°13′45″N 111°23′45″W	Paris	
81	George Spencer House		November 18, 1982 (#82000309)	Center St. and N. 1st East; 42°13′38″N 111°23′52″W	Paris	
82	Henry Stoker House and Outbuildings	Henry Stoker House and Outbuildings	November 18, 1982 (#82000310)	192 S. 2nd East; 42°13′22″N 111°23′44″W	Paris	
83	J.U. Stucki House and Outbuildings	J.U. Stucki House and Outbuildings	April 13, 1983 (#83000275)	S. 1st West; 42°13′30″N 111°24′16″W	Paris	
84	John Sutton House	John Sutton House	November 18, 1982 (#82000311)	140 S. Main St. 42°13′25″N 111°24′06″W	Paris	
85	Taylor's Candy Factory	Taylor's Candy Factory	April 13, 1983 (#83000276)	Main St. 42°13′43″N 111°24′05″W	Paris	
86	Arthur Taylor House	Arthur Taylor House	November 18, 1982 (#82000312)	W. 2nd North; 42°13′53″N 111°24′25″W	Paris	
87	Telephone Company Bungalow	Telephone Company Bungalow	November 18, 1982 (#82000313)	40 W. Center St. 42°13′38″N 111°24′07″W	Paris	
88	Jacob Tueller Jr. House	Jacob Tueller Jr. House	November 18, 1982 (#82000314)	75 S. 1st East; 42°13′31″N 111°23′52″W	Paris	
89	Jacob Tueller Sr. House	Jacob Tueller Sr. House	November 18, 1982 (#82000315)	165 E. 1st South; 42°13′30″N 111°23′48″W	Paris	
90	Wallentine Farmstead	Wallentine Farmstead	November 18, 1982 (#82000316)	Northwest of Paris; 42°14′18″N 111°24′47″W	Paris	
91	Gus Weilermann House	Gus Weilermann House	November 18, 1982 (#82000317)	Southwest of Paris; 42°13′04″N 111°24′43″W	Paris	
92	Wives of Charles C. Rich Historic District	Wives of Charles C. Rich Historic District	November 18, 1982 (#82000318)	S. 1st West; 42°13′23″N 111°24′14″W	Paris	

== Former listings ==
	Name on the Register	Image	Date listed	Date removed	Location	City or town	Description
1	Dance Pavilion		October 6, 1977 (#77000455)	January 31, 1986	Main and E. First S	Paris	
2	MacIntosh-Driver House		May 7, 1973 (#73002268)	June 28, 1974	9th and Washington Streets	Montpelier	Delisted due to relocation in 1974

== See also ==
- List of National Historic Landmarks in Idaho
- National Register of Historic Places listings in Idaho
