= Ezra Allred Cottage =

Historic house in Idaho, United States

- U.S. National Register of Historic Places
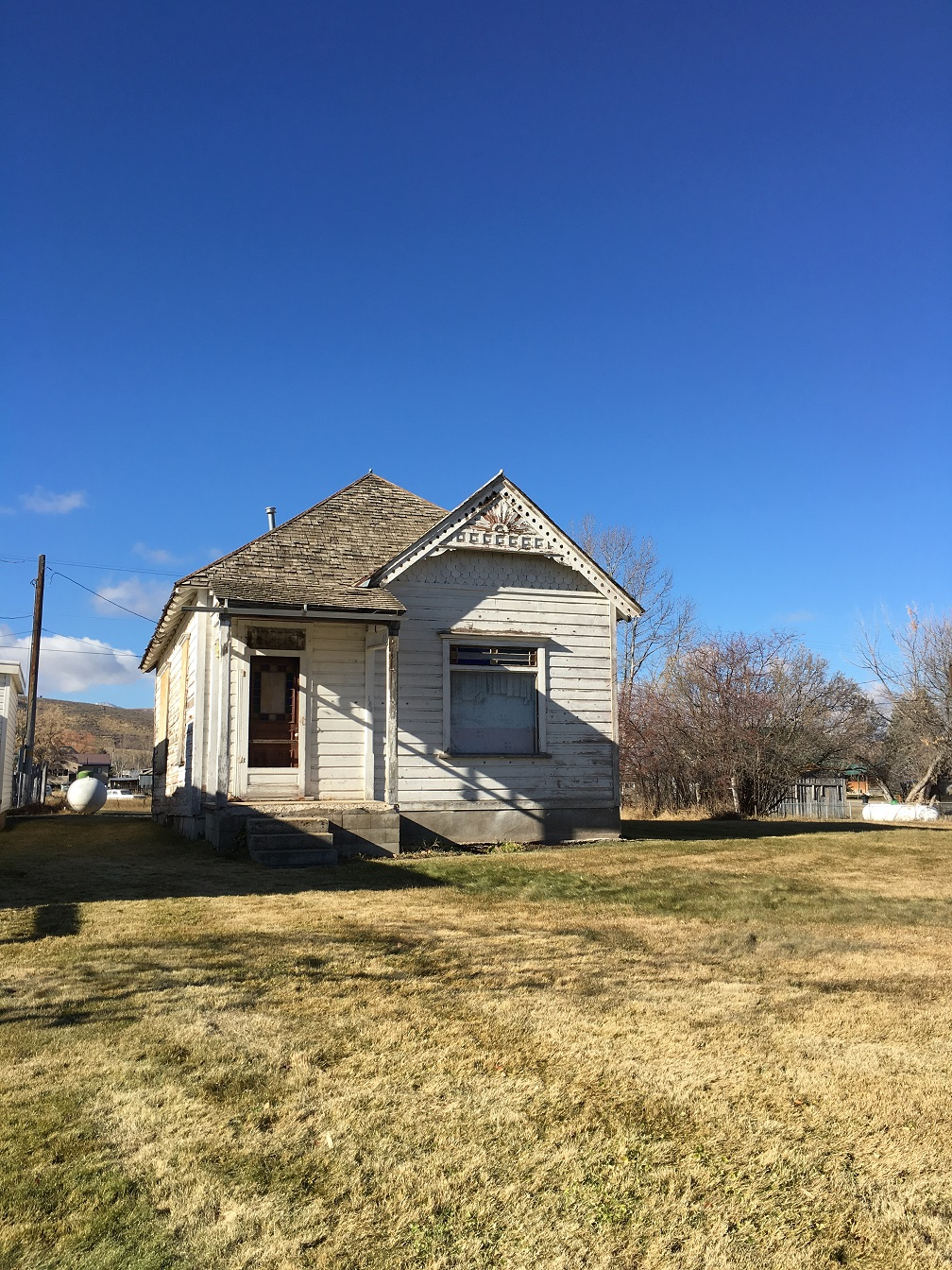

- Location within Idaho Location within the United States
- Location: 159 Main St., Paris, Idaho
- Coordinates: 42°13′50″N 111°24′3″W
- Area: less than one acre
- Built: 1890
- Architectural style: Queen Anne
- MPS: Paris MRA
- NRHP reference No.: 82000259
- Added to NRHP: November 18, 1982

The Ezra Allred Cottage was listed on the National Register of Historic Places in 1982. See also Ezra Allred Bungalow.

It is a shiplap-sided small house with Queen Anne detailing in its porch and in its gable above its main window. The listing includes also a granary.
