= Jacob Tueller Sr. House =

Historic house in Idaho, United States

- Jacob Tueller Sr.
- U.S. National Register of Historic Places
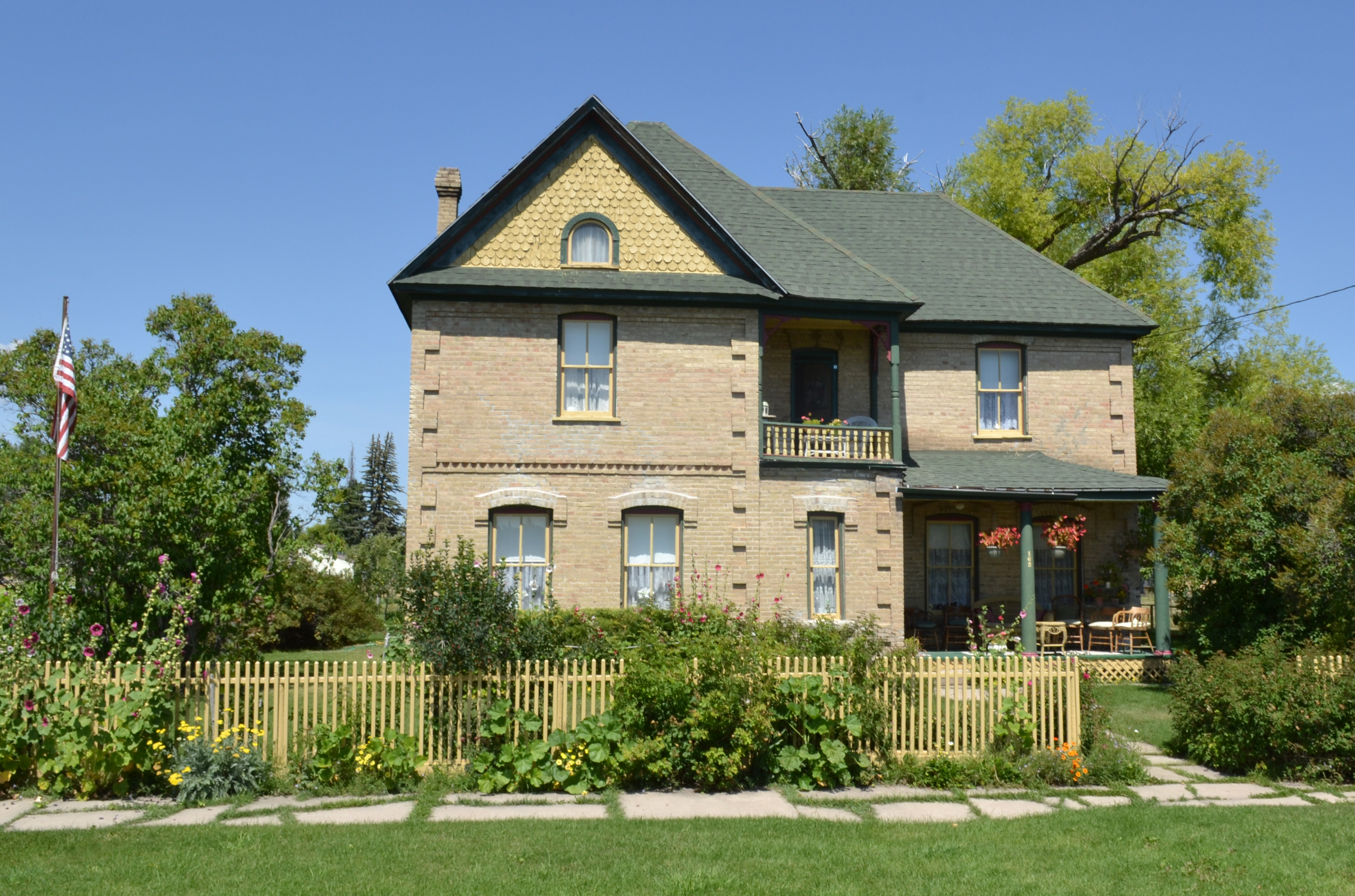

- Location within Idaho Location within the United States
- Location: 165 E. 1st, South, Paris, Idaho
- Coordinates: 42°13′30″N 111°23′46″W
- Area: less than one acre
- Built: 1904
- Architectural style: Queen Anne
- MPS: Paris MRA
- NRHP reference No.: 82000315
- Added to NRHP: November 18, 1982

The Jacob Tueller Sr. House, at 165 E. 1st South in Paris, Idaho, was listed on the National Register of Historic Places in 1982.

It is a two-story buff brick house with outset quoins. The two stories are separated by a decorative outset band consisting of two rows of brick sandwiching a toothed brick row. Wooden decoration includes Tuscan porch columns.

The Jacob Tueller Jr. House, at 75 S. 1st East in Paris, was NRHP-listed at the same time.
