= Gus Weilermann House =

Historic house in Idaho, United States

- U.S. National Register of Historic Places
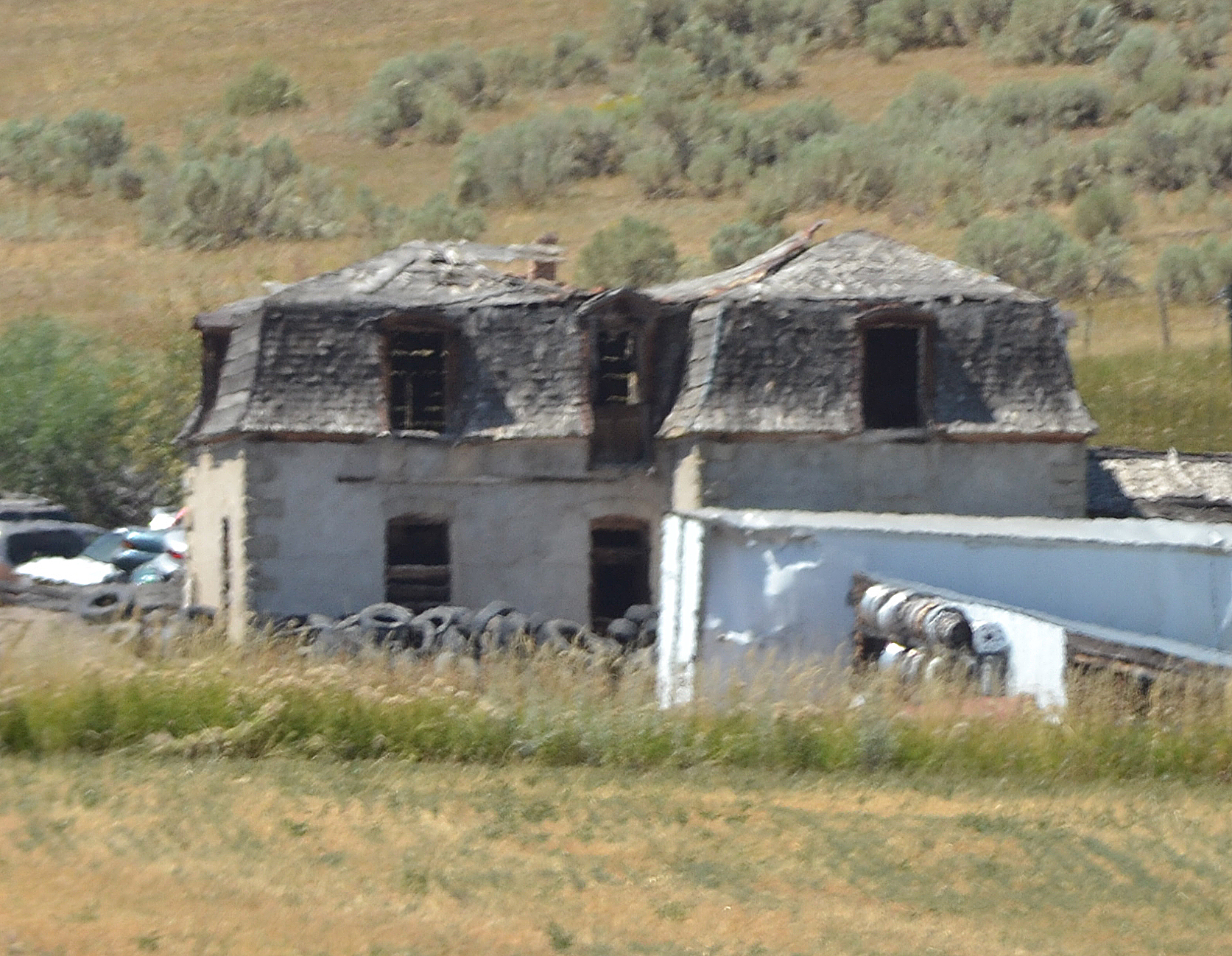

- Location within Idaho Location within the United States
- Location: About one mile southwest of Paris, Idaho
- Coordinates: 42°13′5″N 111°24′39″W
- Area: less than one acre
- Built: c.1890
- Built by: Tueller
- Architectural style: Second Empire
- MPS: Paris MRA
- NRHP reference No.: 82000317
- Added to NRHP: November 18, 1982

The Gus Weilermann House, located southwest of Paris, Idaho, was listed on the National Register of Historic Places in 1982.

The house was deemed architecturally significant "for the distinctive contrast of its mansard form and its rural setting. It has added architectural and historical significance for its resemblance to the now-lost house of Jacob Tueller, Sr., whose family was responsible for the masonry. The Tueller house was also L-shaped with identical disposition of openings, including the gabled upper door."
