= Kate Innes House =

Historic house in Idaho, United States

- U.S. National Register of Historic Places
- Location within Idaho Location within the United States
- Location: 100 E. 2nd, South, Paris, Idaho
- Coordinates: 42°13′20″N 111°23′51″W
- Area: less than one acre
- Built: 1920
- Architectural style: Colonial Revival, Bungalow/craftsman
- MPS: Paris MRA
- NRHP reference No.: 83000264
- Added to NRHP: April 13, 1983

The Kate Innes House, located at 100 E. 2nd South in Paris, Idaho, was built in 1920 and was listed on the National Register of Historic Places in 1983.

It is described as "a squarish, classical cottage with exposed rafters and a low hip-and-ridge roof with, a short ridgebeam running front to back." it has Colonial Revival features including "its symmetrical facade and the classically-massed columns that support the porch."

It was deemed significant "as a delicately rendered example of the classical cottage type—squarish proportions, near pyramidal roof— here strongly influenced by the bungalow style."
