= Fred Price Bungalow =

- U.S. National Register of Historic Places
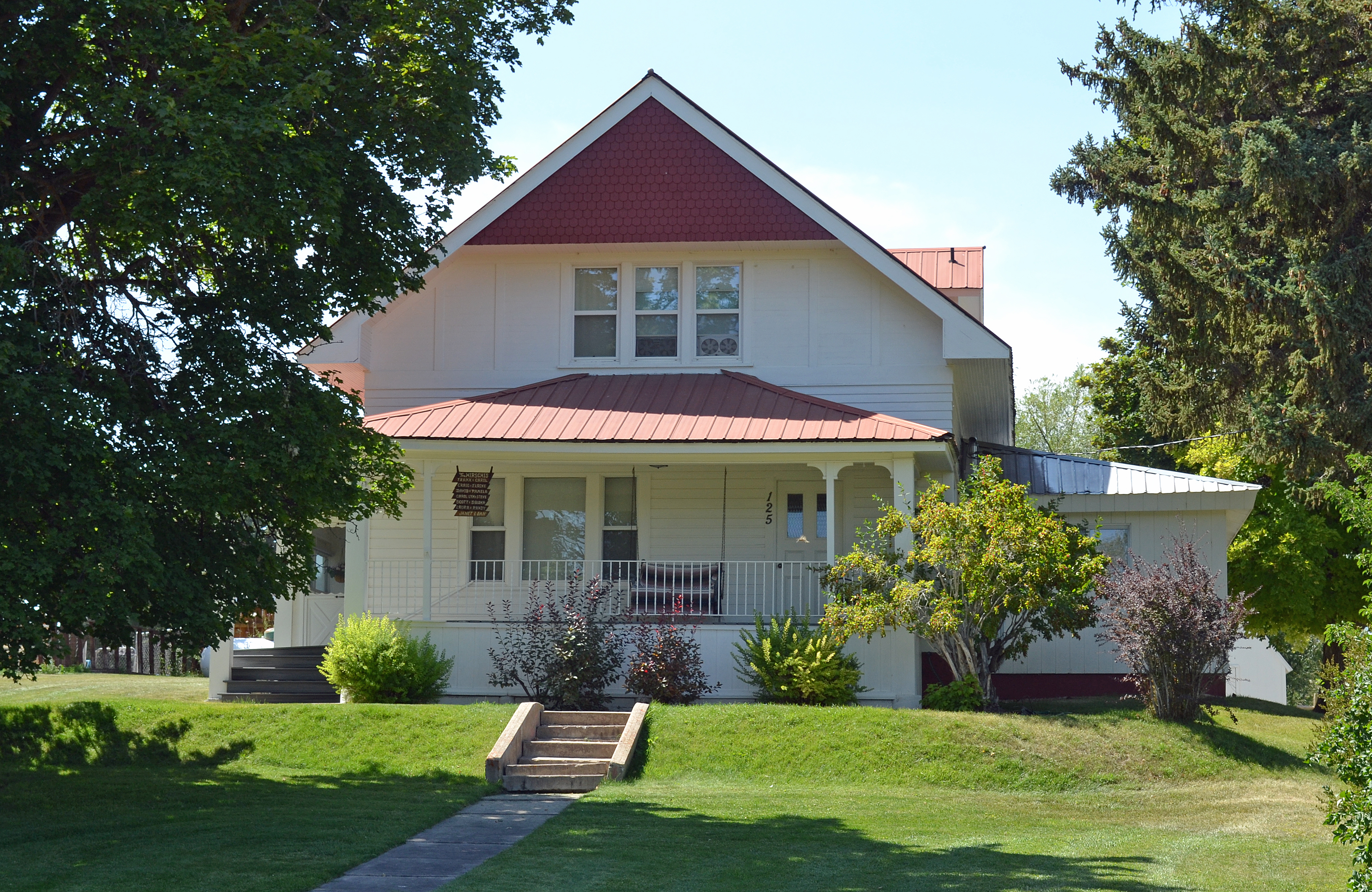
- Fred Price Bungalow in Paris, Idaho. Listed on the National Register of Historic Places.

- Location within Idaho Location within the United States
- Location: 125 N. 1st, West, Paris, Idaho
- Coordinates: 42°13′47″N 111°24′12″W
- Area: less than one acre
- Built: 1910
- Architectural style: Colonial Revival
- MPS: Paris MRA
- NRHP reference No.: 83000272
- Added to NRHP: April 13, 1983

The Fred Price Bungalow, or Fred Price House, at 125 N. 1st West in Paris, Idaho was built in 1910. It was listed on the National Register of Historic Places in 1983.

It includes aspects of Colonial Revival style.

It is a 1 1/2-story gable-fronted house, with a hip-roofed porch crossing its facade. The porch has square corner posts and thinner posts "inset a few feet", and a wrought-iron balustrade. Its lower story is shiplapped; above is a clapboard band and above that is an "apron" covered with fishscale-patterned shingles, and a horizontal wooden siding area with narrow vertical strips.
