= Ted Shepherd Cottage =

- U.S. National Register of Historic Places
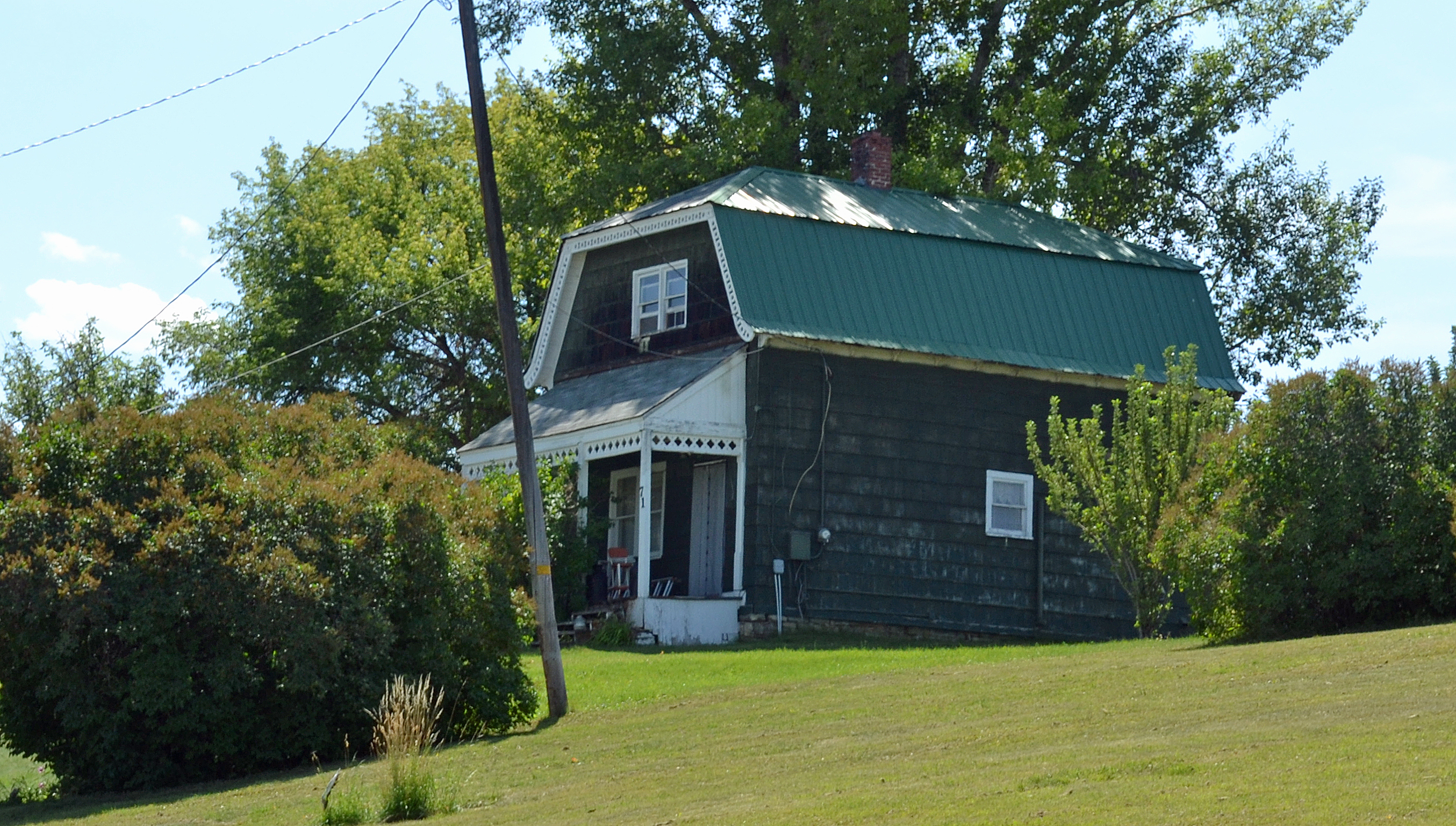

- Location within Idaho Location within the United States
- Location: N. 1st, West, Paris, Idaho
- Coordinates: 42°13′42″N 111°24′13″W
- Area: less than one acre
- Built: 1885
- MPS: Paris MRA
- NRHP reference No.: 82000302
- Added to NRHP: November 18, 1982

The Ted Shepherd Cottage, on N. 1st, West, in Paris, Idaho, was built in 1885. It was listed on the National Register of Historic Places in 1982.

It is a 1 1/2-story frame building, whose narrow front end faces east to the street. Its Idaho State Historical Society inventory report describes it:

The structure of the roof is curious; from the side it appears at first glance to be a mansard, like its neighbors north and south; but the sides of the roof are brought forward on the front to form a jerkin-headed gambrel. The bargeboards lining this unique profile, and the trim under the eave of the shed-roofed porchwhich crosses the east elevation, are boldly perforated with geometric shapes: discs, I's, quatrefoils. A pair of sash windows, probably remodeled, is centered in the gable. The south side elevation contains two doors and two windows in an AB-AB arrangement suggestion the division of the interior space; gabled wall dormers, with bargeboards perforated and flared like those on the facade, break the eave above. There are two interior chimneys. The house has been sided with wide wooden shingle.

It was deemed "architecturally significant as the sole example of the gambrel roofline, though an unusual one, in Paris' residential building (there is a gambrel barn) and for its handsome runs of undereave decoration."
