= John Sutton House =

Historic house in Idaho, United States

- U.S. National Register of Historic Places
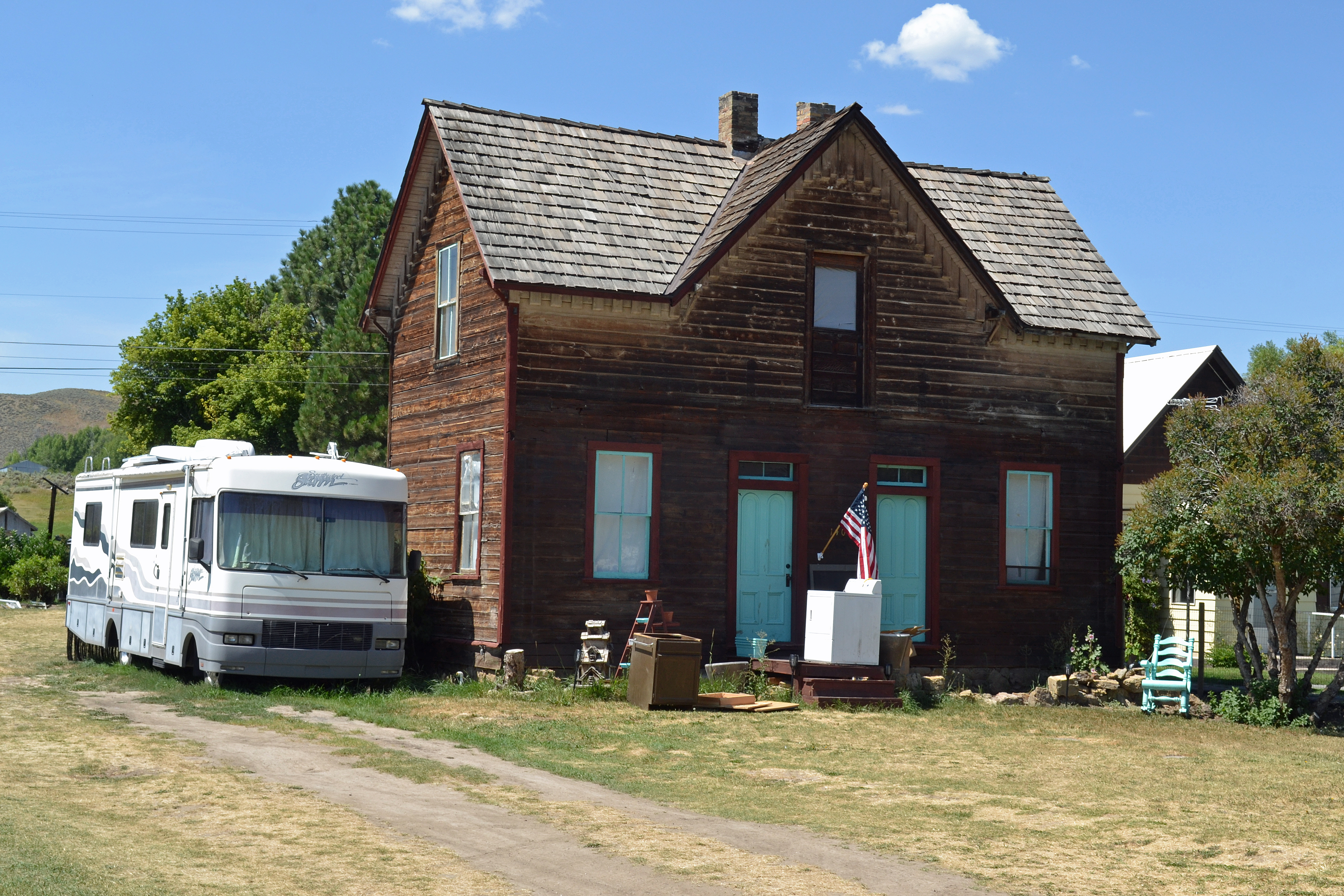

- Location within Idaho Location within the United States
- Location: 140 Main St., Paris, Idaho
- Coordinates: 42°13′26″N 111°24′2″W
- Area: less than one acre
- Built: 1880
- MPS: Paris MRA
- NRHP reference No.: 82000311
- Added to NRHP: November 18, 1982

The John Sutton House, located at 140 Main St. in Paris, Idaho, was built in 1880. It was listed on the National Register of Historic Places in 1982.

It is a 1 1/2-story, shiplap-sided frame house "with an I-house profile."

The house is "architecturally significant as a variation on the I-house, rare in Paris, and for its unique and distinctly handmade ornament. In basic plan, this house conforms to the I-house type, a form found throughout Idaho, but noticeably concentrated in areas of Mormon settlement."
