= Taylor's Candy Factory =

- U.S. National Register of Historic Places
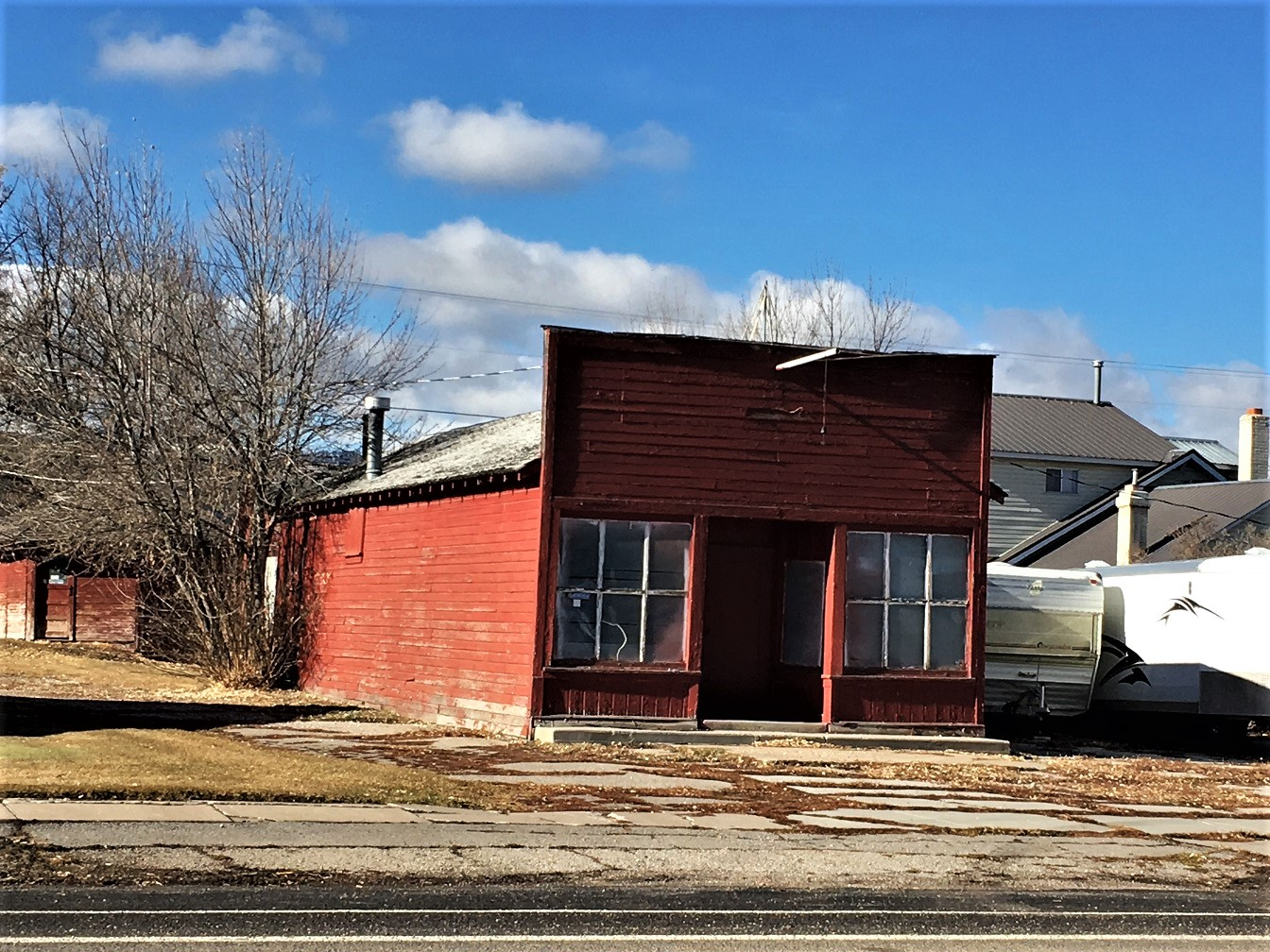

- Location within Idaho Location within the United States
- Location: Main St. Paris, Idaho
- Coordinates: 42°13′42″N 111°24′2″W
- Area: less than one acre
- MPS: Paris MRA
- NRHP reference No.: 83000276
- Added to NRHP: April 13, 1983

The Taylor's Candy Factory, also known as Sticky Taylor's Candy Factory, located on Main Street in Paris, Idaho, was listed on the National Register of Historic Places in 1983.

It is a small wood frame false front commercial structure built sometime before 1929. It is now located on Main Street near West First Street North, facing east, but was moved to this location from a site on the same block sometime in the 1940s.
