= Joseph Cook House =

- U.S. National Register of Historic Places
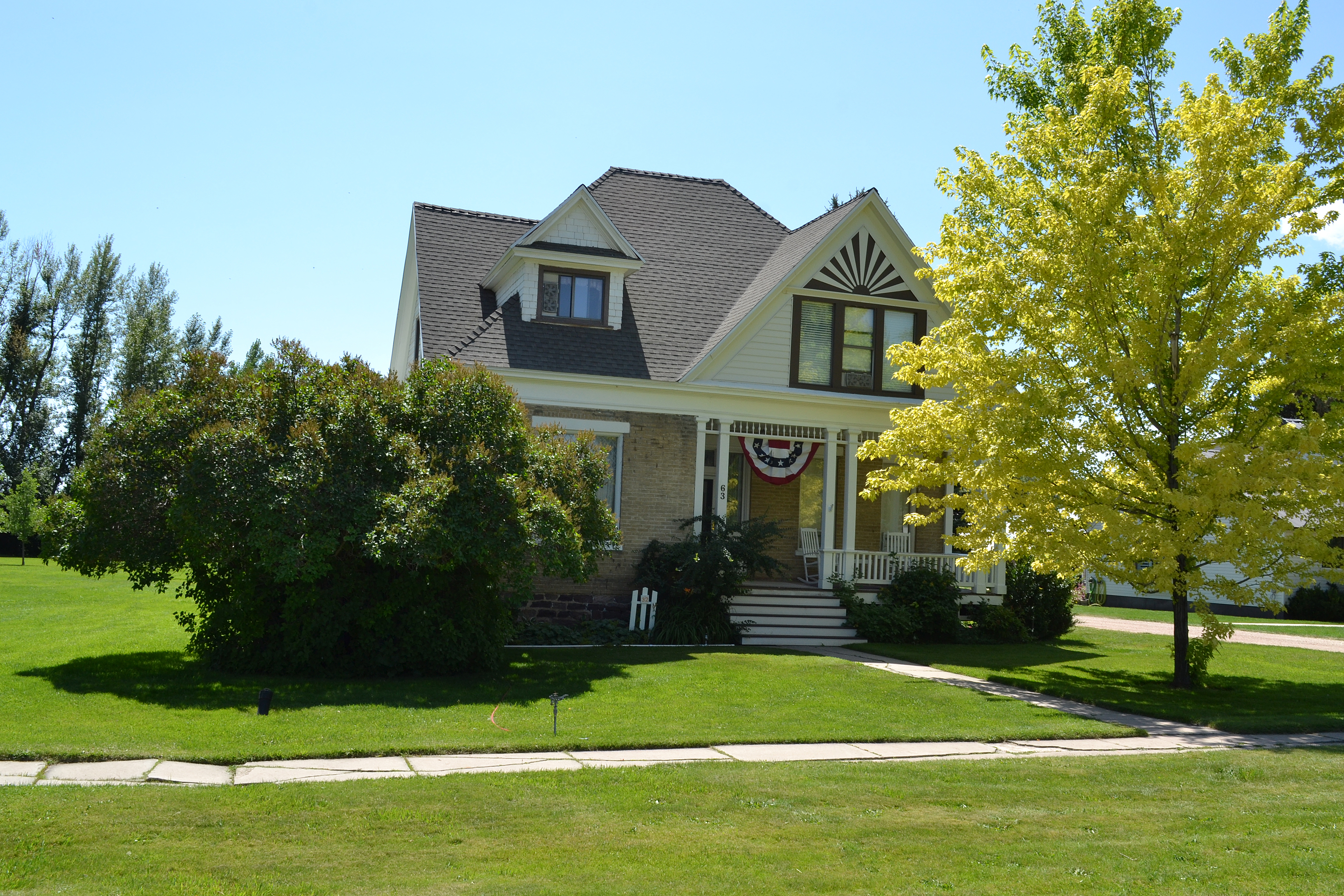

- Location within Idaho Location within the United States
- Location: 63 W. 2nd, South, Paris, Idaho
- Coordinates: 42°13′20″N 111°24′08″W
- Area: less than one acre
- Built: 1906
- Architectural style: Classical Revival, Queen Anne
- MPS: Paris MRA
- NRHP reference No.: 82000270
- Added to NRHP: November 18, 1982

The Joseph Cook House, at 63 W. 2nd, South, in Paris, Idaho, was built in 1906. It was listed on the National Register of Historic Places in 1982.

It is a one-and-a-half-story buff brick house.

The listing included a contributing structure, a historic iron fence separating the property from the street. The fence's "running sections are in a hoop-and-arrow pattern; the gateposts terminate in miniature groin vaults and finials. The legend of Stewart Iron Works, Cincinnati, Ohio, is cast into the metal."
