= Browning Block =

- U.S. National Register of Historic Places
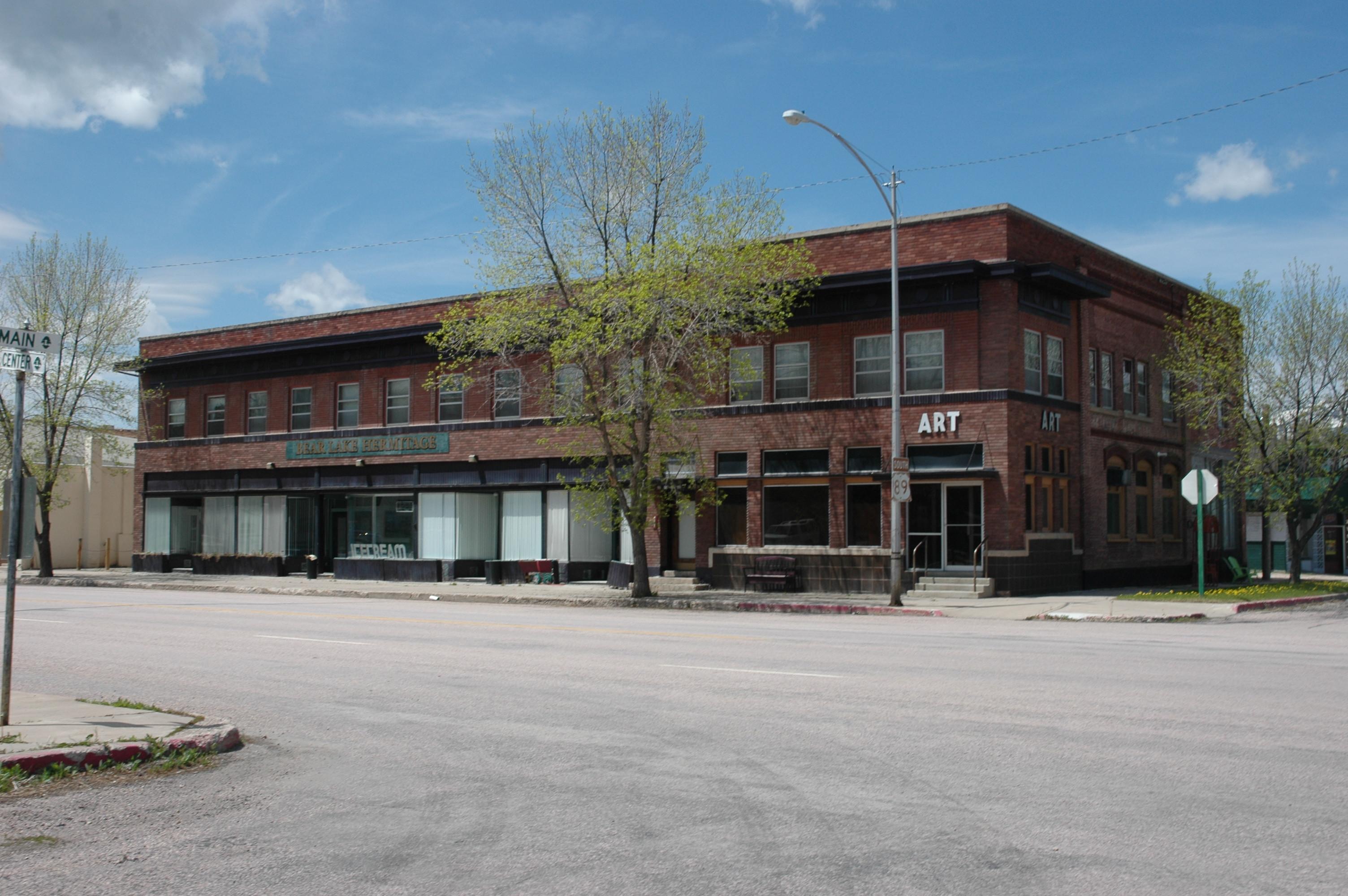

- Location within Idaho Location within the United States
- Location: Main and Center Sts., Paris, Idaho
- Coordinates: 42°13′36″N 111°24′2″W
- Area: less than one acre
- Built: 1905
- Built by: Tueller Brothers
- Architect: Shreeve & Madsen
- MPS: Paris MRA
- NRHP reference No.: 82000265
- Added to NRHP: November 18, 1982

The Browning Block, a building on the southeast corner of Main and Center Sts. in Paris, Idaho, was built in 1905. The building has included specialty stores and a local bank. It is centrally located; across the intersection, on the northeast corner, is the Bear Lake County Courthouse, also NRHP-listed. The construction of the building greatly changed the surrounding streetscape; the commercial block absorbed a preexisting bank building and made Main Street narrower by 16 feet (4.9 m). In addition, the building had some of the most lavish architecture in the city, as it featured a classically inspired frieze and decorative marquees.

The building was listed on the National Register of Historic Places in 1982.
