= Grunder Cabin and Outbuildings =

- U.S. National Register of Historic Places
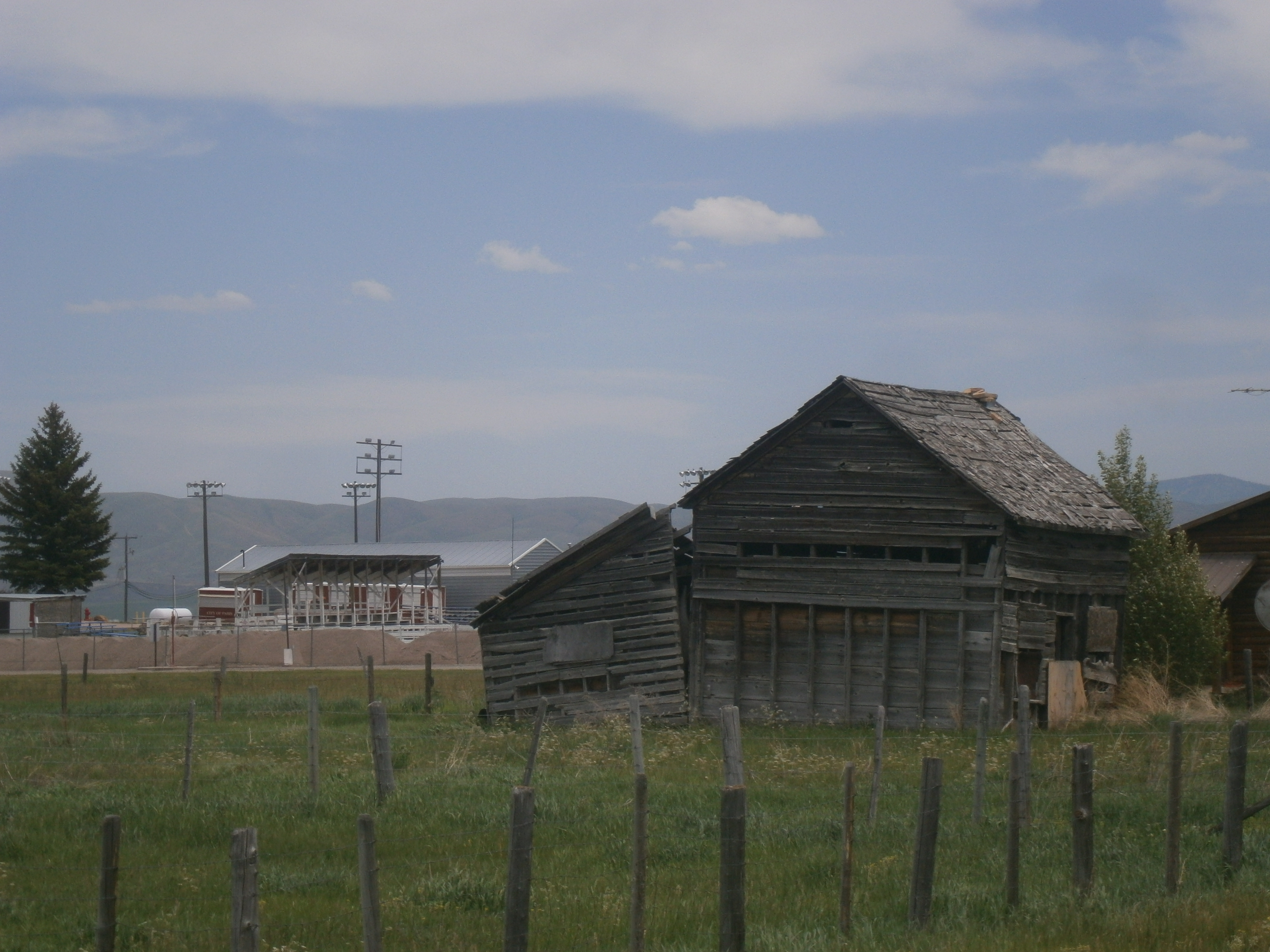
- The cabin in June 2020

- Location within Idaho Location within the United States
- Location: E. 1st, North, Paris, Idaho
- Coordinates: 42°13′45″N 111°23′31″W
- Area: less than one acre
- Built: 1880
- MPS: Paris MRA
- NRHP reference No.: 82000272
- Added to NRHP: November 18, 1982

The Grunder Cabin and Outbuildings, on E. 1st, North in Paris, Idaho, dates from c.1880. The collection was listed on the National Register of Historic Places in 1982. The listing included three contributing buildings and one contributing structure.

The main, front section of the cabin has a gabled front and is about 16 by 12 feet (4.9 m × 3.7 m) in plan. A one-story 12 by 6 feet (3.7 m × 1.8 m) lean-to extends to the rear.

Its form is apparently from the Upland South.
