= Thomas Smedley House =

Historic house in Idaho, United States

- U.S. National Register of Historic Places
- Location within Idaho Location within the United States
- Location: E. 1st St., North, Paris, Idaho
- Coordinates: 42°13′46″N 111°23′42″W
- Area: less than one acre
- Built: c.1870
- Built by: Smedley, Thomas
- MPS: Paris MRA
- NRHP reference No.: 82000308
- Added to NRHP: November 18, 1982

The Thomas Smedley House, located on E. 1st North in Paris, Idaho, was built around1870 by Thomas Smedley. It was listed on the National Register of Historic Places in 1982.

== History ==
Thomas Smedley was a brick-maker though he constructed his home out of wood. The house was deemed "architecturally significant as a good illustration of the additive approach to house composition which characterized much of Paris' historic building and as an example of the increasing refinement of the component folk forms. The son of the builder indicates that the house was built in three stages: the central hall-and-parlor section, the left wing and then the right wing. The Smedley family arrived in Paris in 1873 and it is likely that the center cabin was their original house, being of similar siding and scale to other early frame cabins in town."
