= Lewis Bungalow =

Historic house in Idaho, United States

- Lewis Bungalow; Fred Lewis Cottage; Lewis Barn
- U.S. National Register of Historic Places
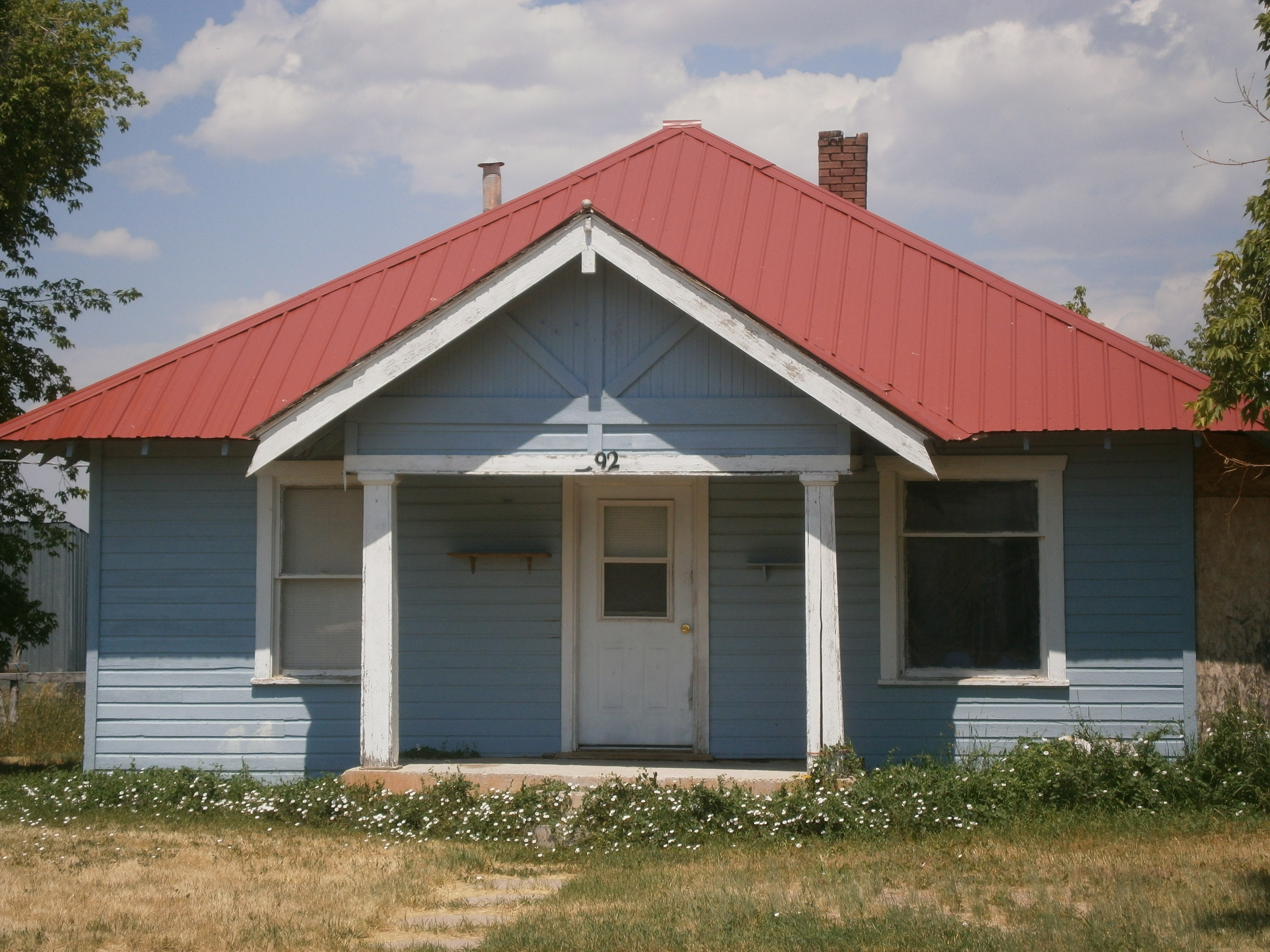
- Fred Lewis Cottage

- Location within Idaho Location within the United States
- Location: W. 2nd, North, Paris, Idaho
- Area: less than one acre
- Architectural style: Bungalow/craftsman
- MPS: Paris MRA
- NRHP reference No.: 83000267, 83000268, 82000282
- Added to NRHP: April 13, 1983

The Lewis Bungalow, the Lewis Barn, and the Fred Lewis Cottage, all located on W. 2nd North in Paris, Idaho were listed on the National Register of Historic Places.

The Lewis Bungalow was listed April 13, 1983. It is a bungalow with front-facing gables and an outset, front porch. (#83000267)

The Fred Lewis Cottage was listed April 13, 1983.(#83000268)

The Lewis Barn was listed November 18, 1982.(#82000282) By 2008 or 2017 the barn seems to be gone. (Note: By 2017 Google satellite view and Bing birdseye view imagery both accessed October 16, 2017, it appears that the barn is gone. The 42.231992, 111.405969 coordinates provided here point to an area directly behind the Lewis Bungalow which appears, in satellite view, to be the former location of a building. July 2008 Google streetview, accessed October 16, 2017, shows no barn structure, although view to barn in rear would be partially obscured.)
