= Beck Barns and Automobile Storage =

- U.S. National Register of Historic Places
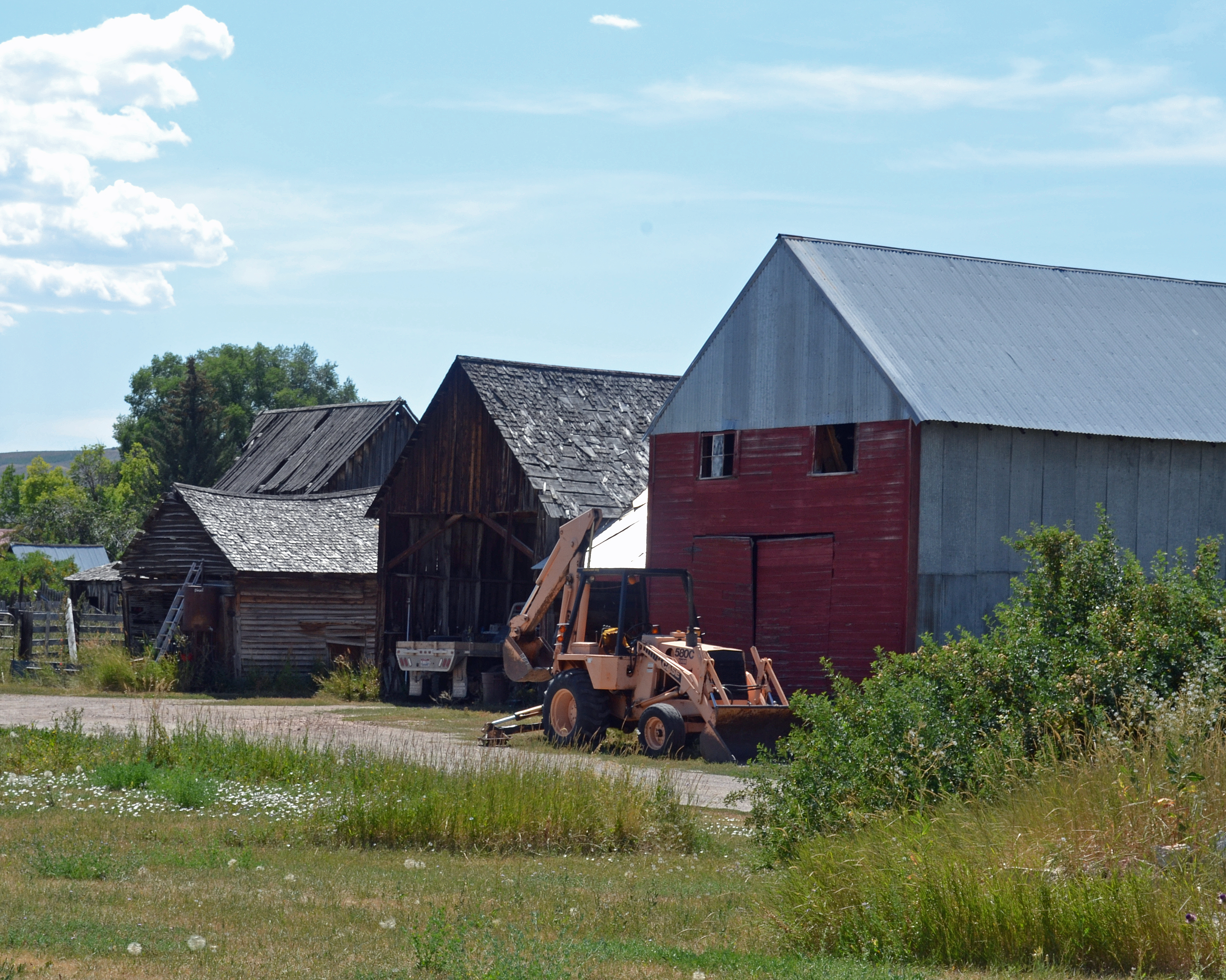

- Location within Idaho
- Location: Center St., Paris, Idaho
- Coordinates: 42°13′35″N 111°24′05″W
- Area: less than one acre
- Built: c.1880, 1907-29
- MPS: Paris MRA
- NRHP reference No.: 82000263
- Added to NRHP: November 18, 1982

Beck Barns and Automobile Storage, on Center St. in Paris, Idaho, was listed on the National Register of Historic Places in 1982. The listing included four contributing buildings.

The listed complex consists of a former automobile storage building, an automobile garage, and two barns. A corral surrounds the two barns, one of which dates from c.1880.
