= Bear Lake Market =

- U.S. National Register of Historic Places
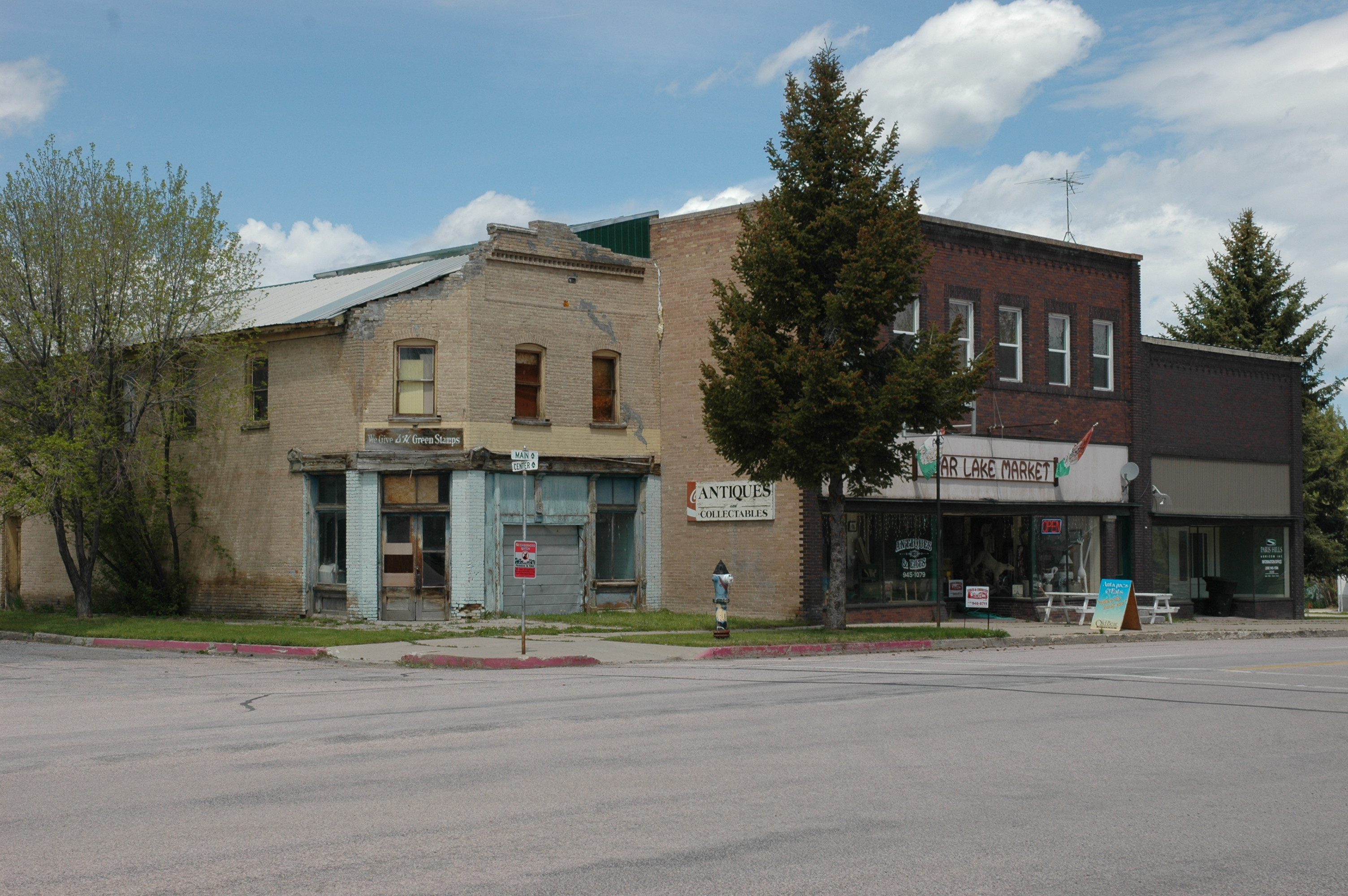

- Location within Idaho Location within the United States
- Location: N. Main St., Paris, Idaho
- Coordinates: 42°13′38″N 111°24′2″W
- Area: less than one acre
- Built: 1890
- MPS: Paris MRA
- NRHP reference No.: 82000262
- Added to NRHP: November 18, 1982

The Bear Lake Market on N. Main St. in Paris, Idaho dates from 1890. It was listed o the National Register of Historic Places in 1982.

The listing included a two-story three-bay building and the adjoining one-story building to its north. The one-story building has brick pilasters and leaded glass mezzanine lights.

It was deemed significant "as a fine example of local brickwork, and as the former home of the Shepherd mercantile operations, the main commercial enterprise to succeed the once-prominent cooperative store."
