= Paris Cemetery (Paris, Idaho) =

Historic cemetery in Bear Lake County, Idaho, US

- U.S. National Register of Historic Places
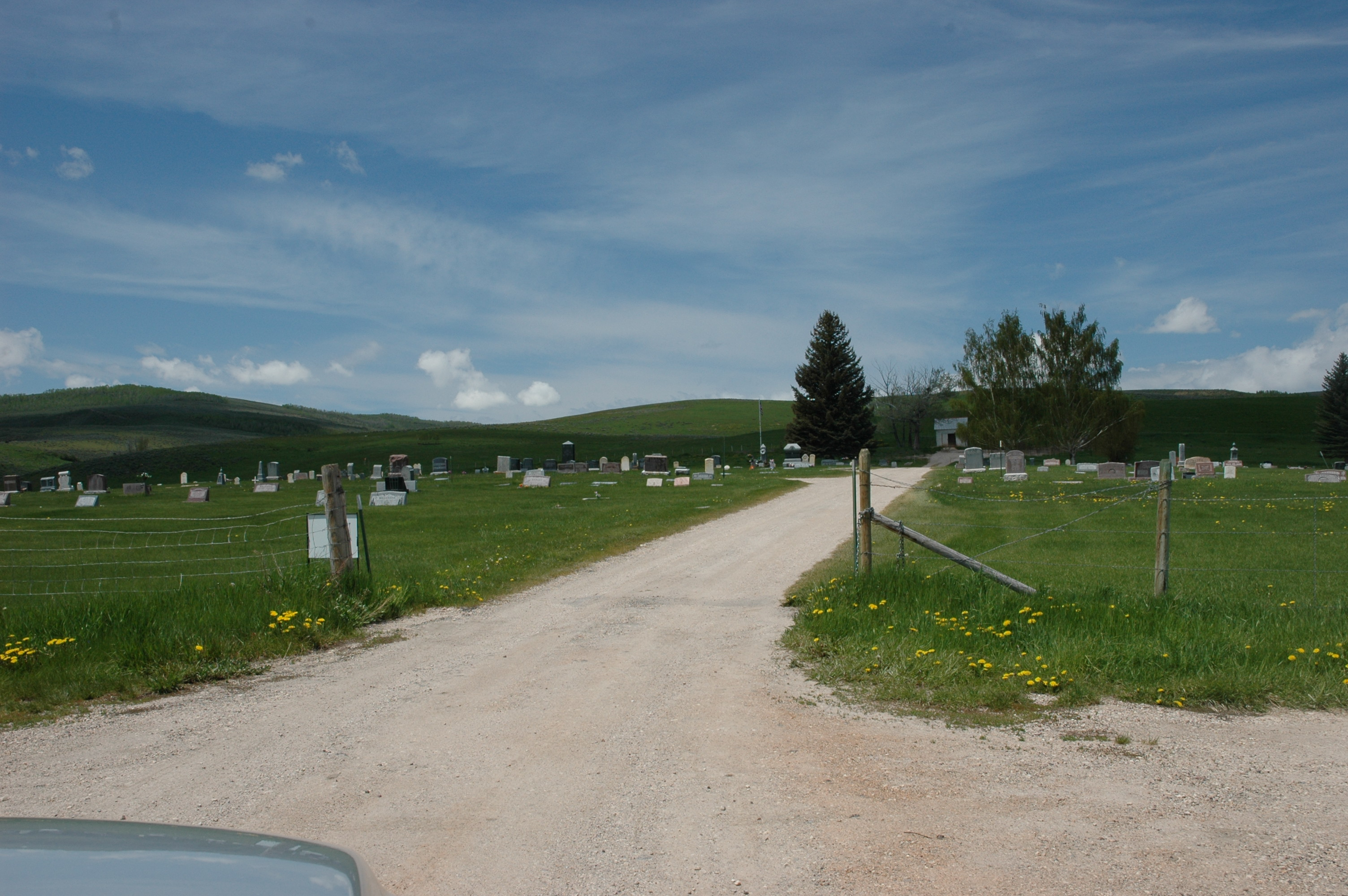
- Photo from 2011

- Location within Idaho
- Location: Off U.S. Route 89, Paris, Idaho
- Coordinates: 42°12′48″N 111°24′25″W
- Area: 10 acres (4.0 ha)
- Built: 1870
- MPS: Paris MRA
- NRHP reference No.: 82000287
- Added to NRHP: November 18, 1982

The Paris Cemetery in Bear Lake County, Idaho, near Paris, Idaho, was established in 1870. It was listed on the National Register of Historic Places in 1982.

It was deemed significant "in the areas of landscape architecture and craft for its range of very well-worked and distinctive funerary monuments, in the area of social and humanitarian movements for its icons and arrangements illustrative of Mormon beliefs and customs, and, secondarily, in the area of local history for its commemoration of persons important to the settlement and subsequent development of Paris."

It is located south of Paris, west of U.S. Route 89.
