= James Collings Jr. House =

- U.S. National Register of Historic Places
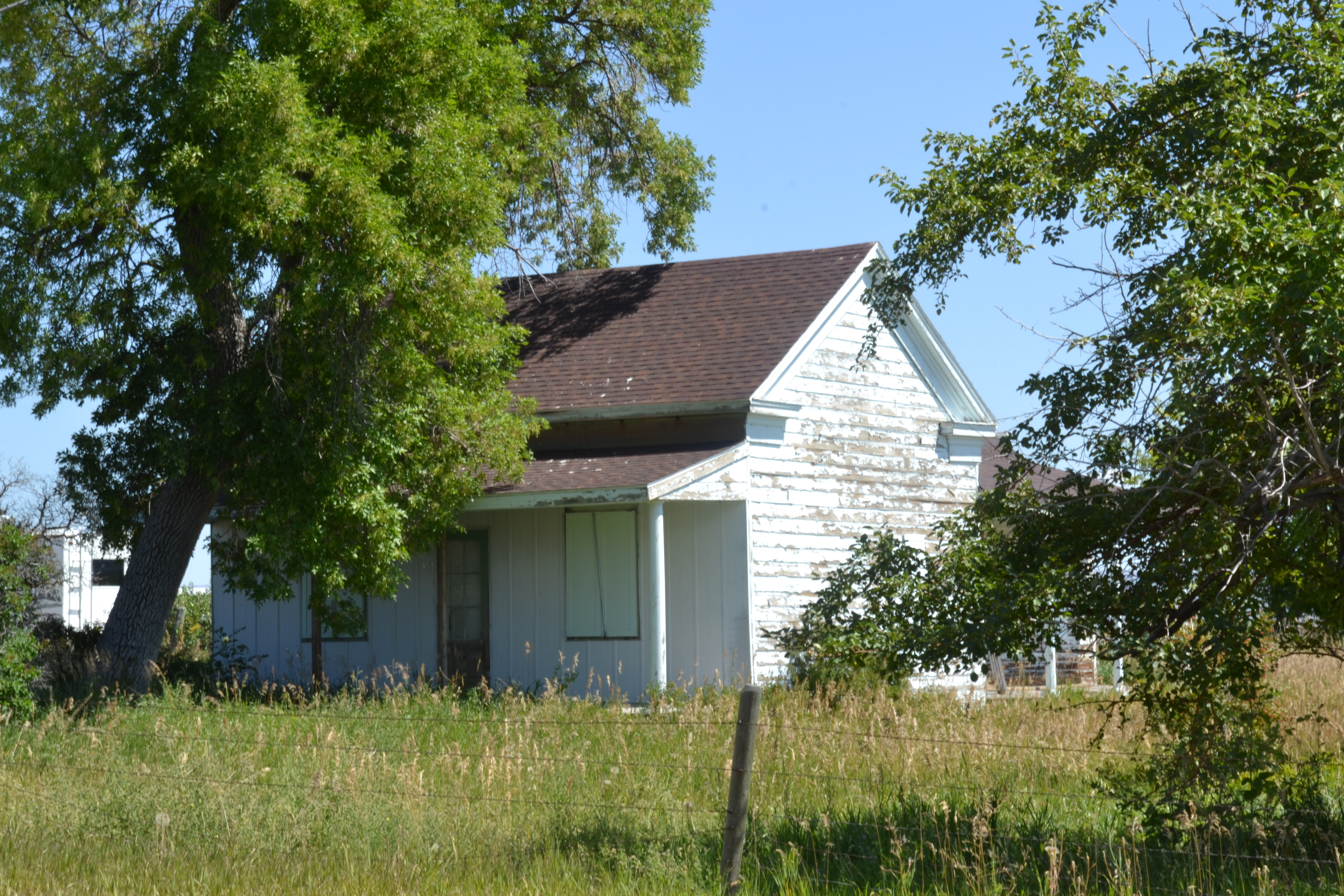

- Location within Idaho
- Nearest city: Paris, Idaho
- Coordinates: 42°13′00″N 111°23′59″W
- Area: less than one acre
- Built: 1876
- Built by: James Collings, Sr.
- Architectural style: Greek Revival
- MPS: Paris MRA
- NRHP reference No.: 82001888
- Added to NRHP: November 18, 1982

The James Collings Jr. House, in Bear Lake County, Idaho, was built in 1876. It was listed on the National Register of Historic Places in 1982.

It was built by carpenter James Collings, Sr., with elements of Greek Revival style, including eave returns.

Its nomination describes it as "one of the purest examples in Paris of the pioneers' impulse to reproduce the aesthetic trappings of the environment left behind in an effort to 'civilize' the new place. It also appears to be one of the few folk-form residences in the state to exhibit such a relatively academic style in its decorative scheme, and to do so with such confidence."

The nomination includes an "inside-out" granary (a frame structure with studs on the outside) as a contributing building in the listing.

It is located on the east side of U.S. Route 89, approximately a mile south of Paris.
