= Orson Grimmett Bungalow =

Historic house in Idaho, United States

- U.S. National Register of Historic Places
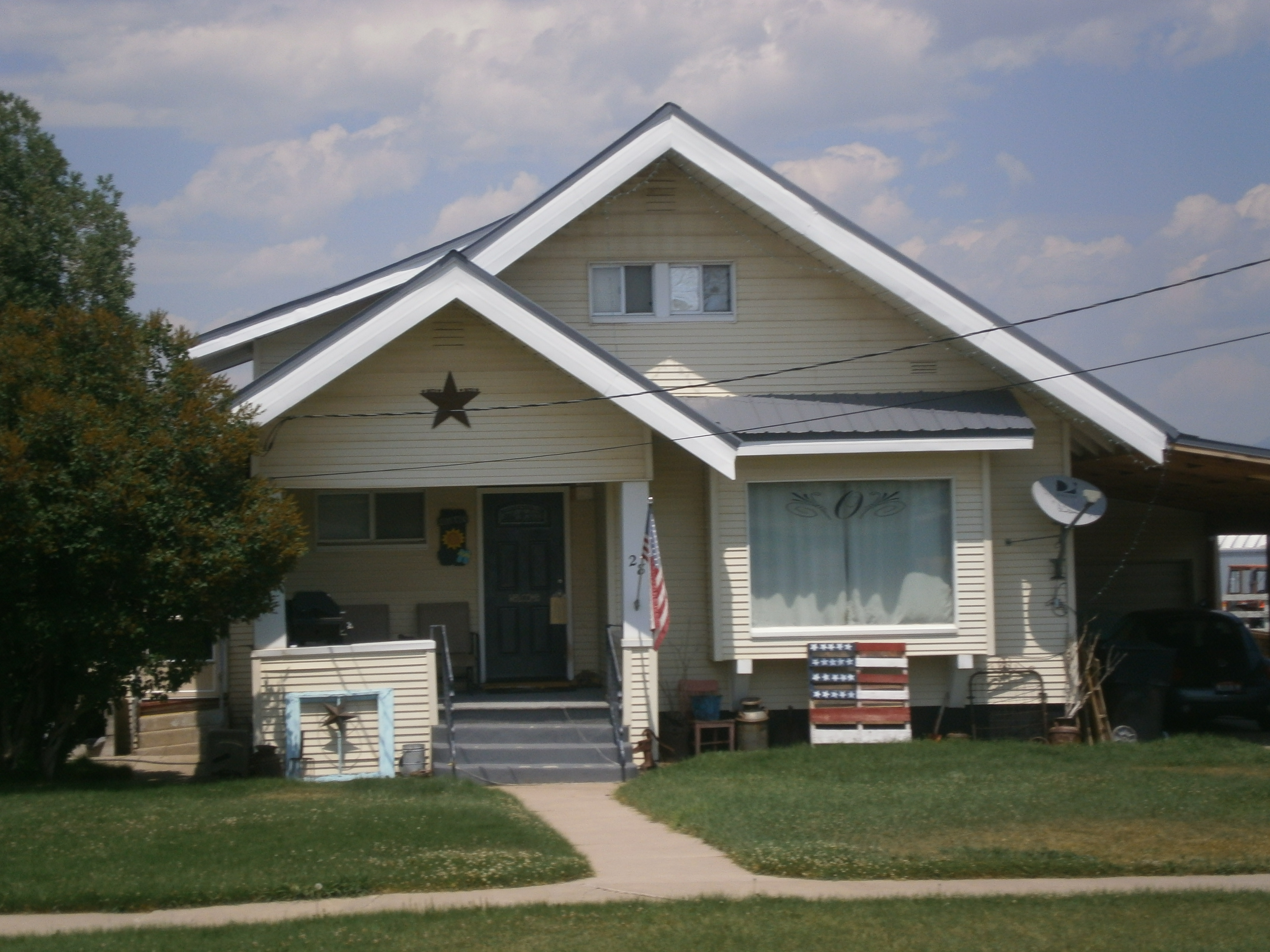

- Location within Idaho Location within the United States
- Location: 28 W. 2nd, North, Paris, Idaho
- Coordinates: 42°13′54″N 111°24′5″W
- Area: less than one acre
- Built by: Grimmett, Orson
- Architectural style: Bungalow/craftsman
- MPS: Paris MRA
- NRHP reference No.: 83000263
- Added to NRHP: April 13, 1983

The Orson Grimmett Bungalow was listed on the National Register of Historic Places in 1983.

The house was deemed "locally significant for its association with a prominent local builder whose work is still visible in Paris and surrounding towns. Grimmett also owned and operated the Star Confectionery, a 1920's soda fountain. His house at Twenty-eight West Second North, which he built himself, is a strikingly unpretentious, simple plan. The standard bungalow shape is only slightly embellished with purlins and brackets, and the shallow bays and dormers do little to deny the building's boxy massing. Like the Paris LDS Seminary that Grimmett built during this period, the Grimmett bungalow belies a conservative, formulaic, and classicizing bent in LDS architecture, which may be traced from the nineteenth century folk architecture through the twentieth century forms. The Grimmett bungalow is architecturally significant as an owner-built expression of this Mormon esthetic."

== See also ==
- John Grimmett Jr. House, also NRHP-listed
