= Latham Bungalow =

- U.S. National Register of Historic Places
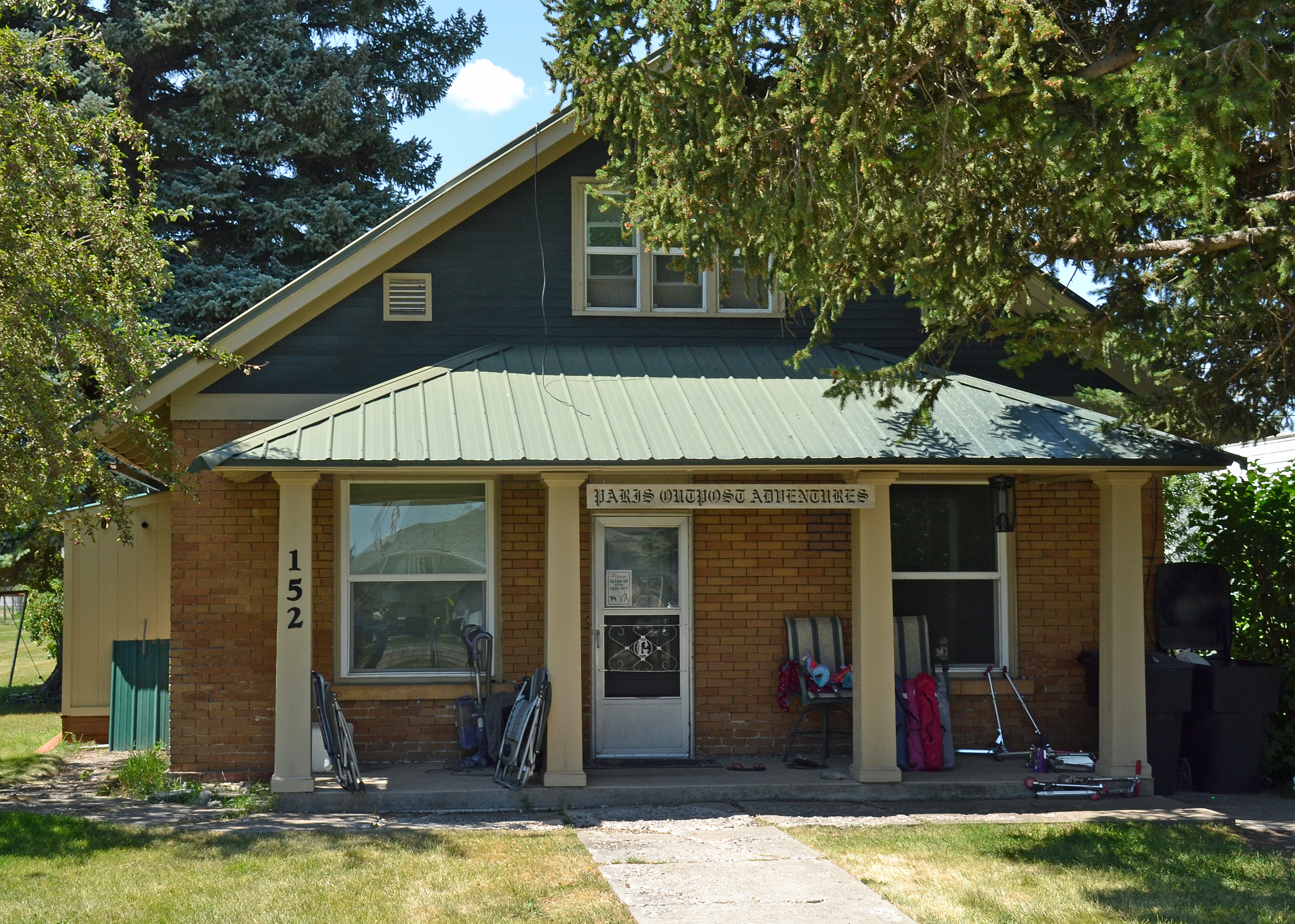

- Location within Idaho Location within the United States
- Location: 152 S. 1st, East, Paris, Idaho
- Coordinates: 42°13′26″N 111°23′51″W
- Area: less than one acre
- Architectural style: Colonial Revival, Bungalow/craftsman
- MPS: Paris MRA
- NRHP reference No.: 83000266
- Added to NRHP: April 13, 1983

The Latham Bungalow or Latham House in Paris, Idaho, at 152 S. 1st, East, was listed on the National Register of Historic Places in 1983.

It is a cottage built of "rusty yellow-brown brick, with a wood-sided, bed-molded gable and an outset hipped porch on battered, squared 'Greek Doric' wood posts."

It was deemed significant as a gable-front Colonial Revival style house with some influence of bungalow style. Colonial Revival features include its columns and its symmetrical facade.
