= Keller House and Derrick =

Historic place in Paris, Idaho, USA

- Keller House and Derick
- U.S. National Register of Historic Places
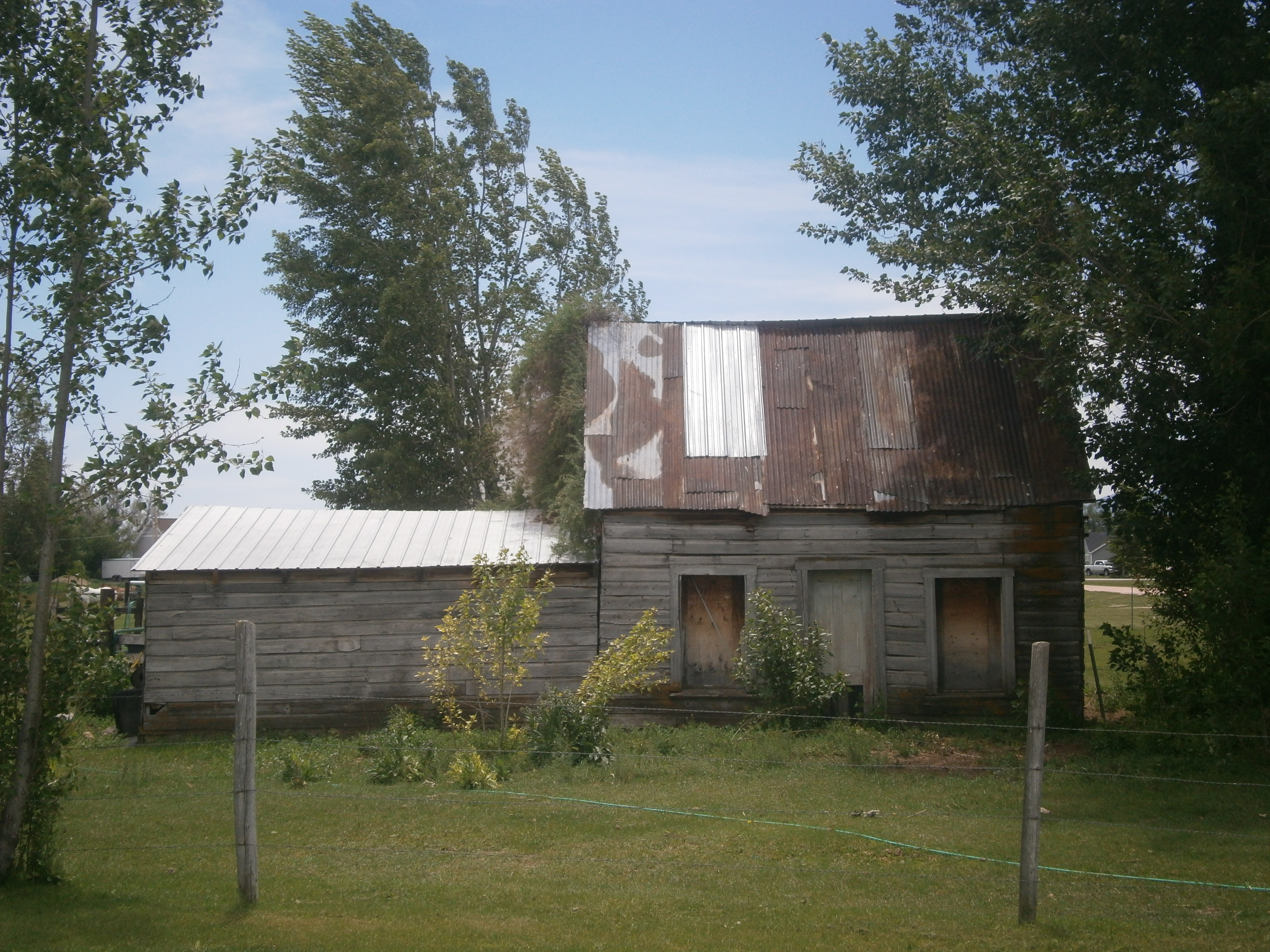
- The house in June 2020

- Location within Idaho Location within the United States
- Location: E. 1st, North, Paris, Idaho
- Coordinates: 42°13′43″N 111°23′38″W
- Area: 2 acres (0.81 ha)
- Built: 1880
- Architectural style: Southern Mountain
- MPS: Paris MRA
- NRHP reference No.: 82001889
- Added to NRHP: November 18, 1982

The Keller House and Derick, on E. 1st, North in Paris, Idaho, was listed on the National Register of Historic Places in 1982.

The 14 by 14 feet (4.3 m × 4.3 m) cabin is a square Southern Mountain-style cabin, likely built of logs, covered with shiplap siding. It has a tall gable roof with two gabled dormer windows, and it has a 10 by 10 feet (3.0 m × 3.0 m) ell at the rear. It is one of 18 small square cabins known in Paris, which are otherwise rare in Idaho.

Nearby in a field east of the house is "a fine example" of what is called a Mormon derrick which is:

a device of folk technology used until recently throughout the Great Basin to stack loose hay into tall round-topped stacks. The Keller derrick is the Mormon derrick type, distinguished by its quatrepodal base supporting an upright mast, at the top of which pivots a boom. The base is built of three six-by-six timbers, cut on a circular saw, laid over two similar sills and notched with straight-sided saddle notches at the intersections of sill and crosspiece. These joints are fixed with heavy nuts and bolts. Smaller four-by-four timbers form a quatrepod upon this base, securing the heavy central log mast. Balanced at the top of the mast is a log boom, fastened with a pin that allows horizontal and vertical movement. Pulleys, used to control the hoisting and dumping of hay, are attached to the middle and upper end of the boom. A cable stretched along the top of the derrick and over metal and wooden braces probably acts as a brace for the entire boom.
