= Bishop West Barn =

- U.S. National Register of Historic Places
- Location within Idaho Location within the United States
- Location: W. 2nd St., Paris, Idaho
- Coordinates: 42°13′20″N 111°24′13″W
- Area: less than one acre
- Built: c. 1880
- Architectural style: Log
- MPS: Paris MRA
- NRHP reference No.: 82000264
- Added to NRHP: November 18, 1982

The Bishop West Barn, on W. 2nd St. in Paris, Idaho, was built in the 1880s. It was listed on the National Register of Historic Places in 1982.

It was associated with the leader (bishop) of a Mormon congregation. Specifically, it was deemed "significant for its association in folk memory with a Bishop West, who came to Paris to serve as bishop of the Paris First Ward in 1883. Appropriate to West's position in the Paris community, his barn is a large example of the Paris barn type in a variant with one side lean-to. Log construction details common to Paris appear in this barn: hewn log timbers joined with half-dovetail notching and chinked with split poles and daub."
