= Amos Hulme Barn =

- U.S. National Register of Historic Places
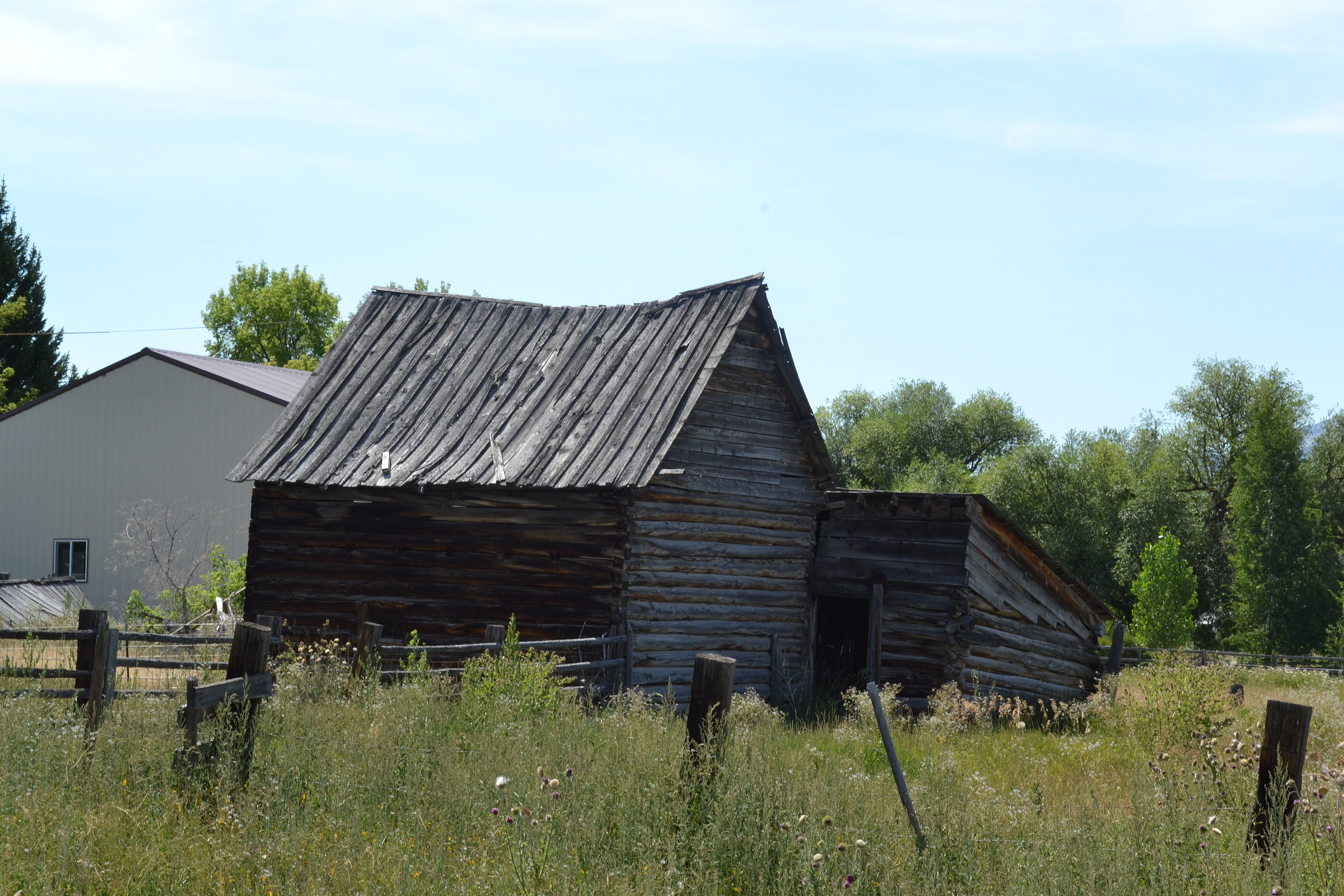

- Location within Idaho Location within the United States
- Location: N. 1st, East, Paris, Idaho
- Coordinates: 42°13′48″N 111°23′51″W
- Area: less than one acre
- Built: 1880
- Architectural style: Log
- MPS: Paris MRA
- NRHP reference No.: 82000276
- Added to NRHP: November 18, 1982

The Amos Hulme Barn in Paris, Idaho was listed on the National Register of Historic Places in 1982.

It was deemed to be "one of the best preserved of Paris's modest log barns".
