= Wallentine Farmstead =

- U.S. National Register of Historic Places
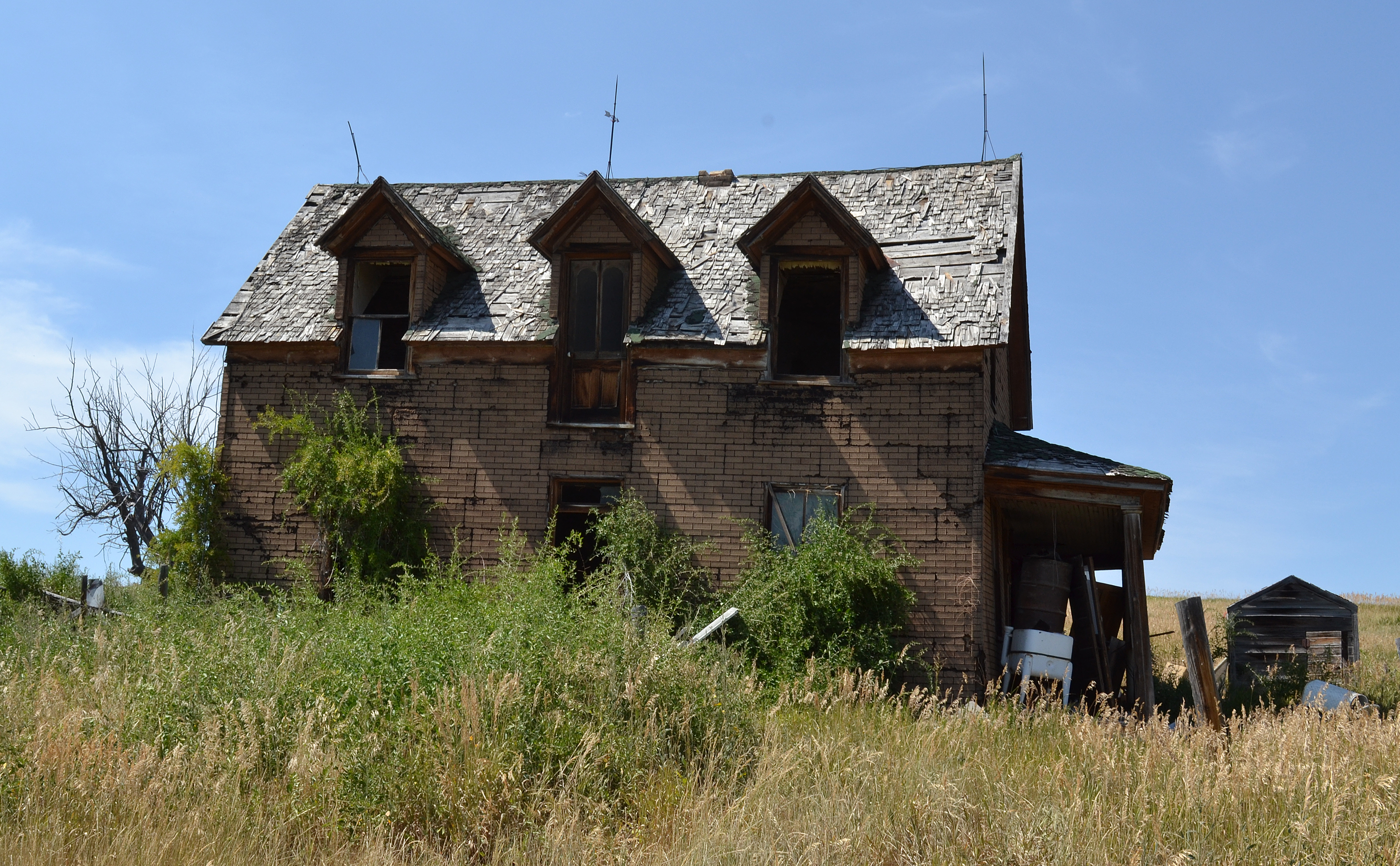

- Location within Idaho Location within the United States
- Nearest city: Paris, Idaho
- Coordinates: 42°14′18″N 111°24′44″W
- Area: less than one acre
- Built: 1890
- Architectural style: I-house
- MPS: Paris MRA
- NRHP reference No.: 82000316
- Added to NRHP: November 18, 1982

The Wallentine Farmstead near Paris, Idaho is an I-house which is listed on the National Register of Historic Places in 1982.

It was deemed "architecturally significant as an excellent and nearly prototypical example of the I-house form as found in the Mormon West and as a component of a particularly fine farmstead, sited well." It has a row of gabled dormers and an upper door, similar to those on the Stucki House (also listed on the National Register), and these "are said to be the Mormon variant of the one-and-one-half-story, four room type."

The property includes a barn with attached corral, a granary, a shed, and an outhouse.
