= Wives of Charles C. Rich Historic District =

Historic district in Idaho, United States

- U.S. National Register of Historic Places
- U.S. Historic district
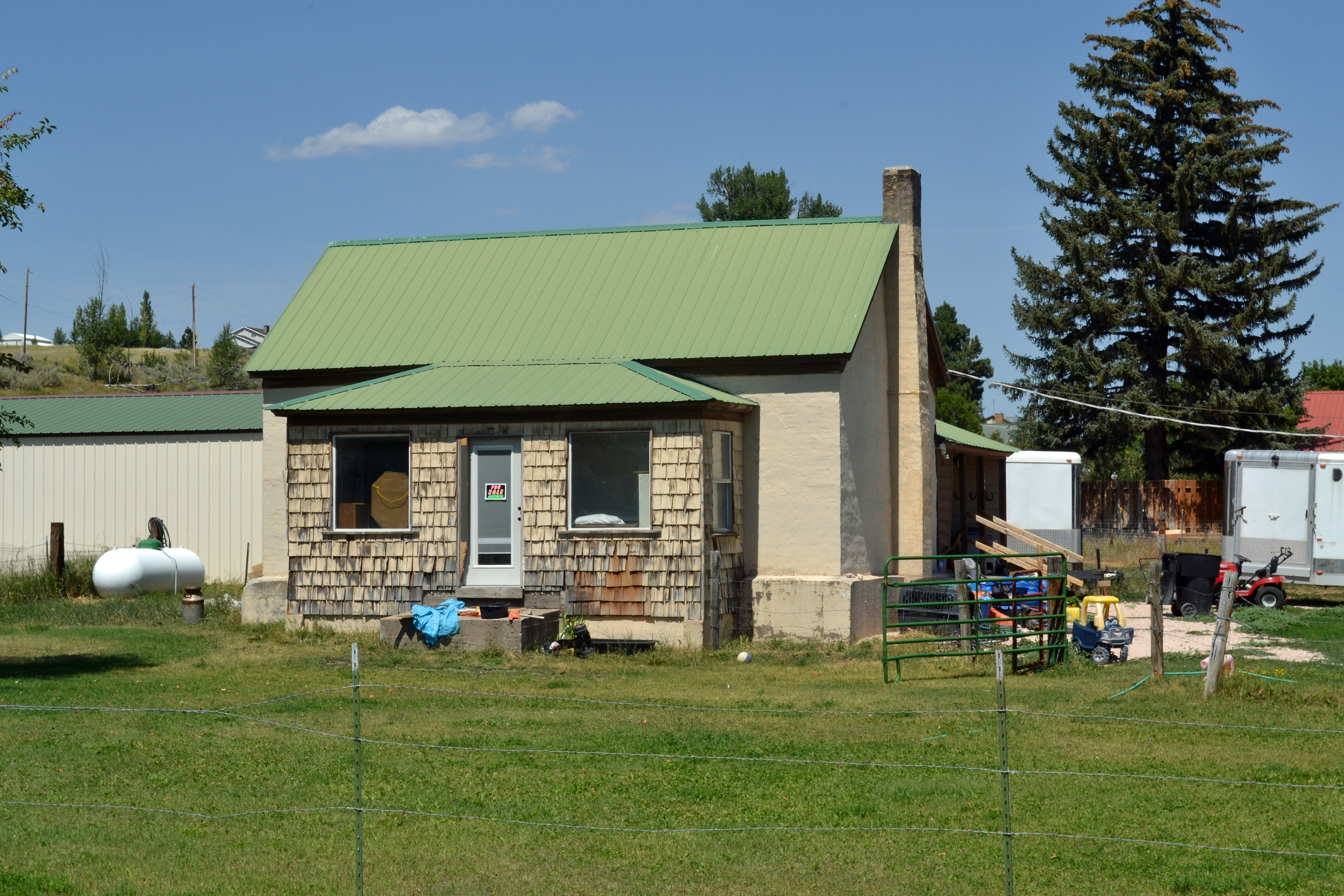

- Location within Idaho Location within the United States
- Location: S. 1st, West, Paris, Idaho
- Coordinates: 42°13′26″N 111°24′12″W
- Area: 10 acres (4.0 ha)
- MPS: Paris MRA
- NRHP reference No.: 82000318
- Added to NRHP: November 18, 1982

The Wives of Charles C. Rich Historic District is a 10 acres (4.0 ha) historic district including four similar houses in Paris, Idaho. The houses were for the plural wives of Charles C. Rich, "the chief colonizer of Paris." It was listed on the National Register of Historic Places in 1982.

The listing includes four houses and a barn, all possibly built in the late 1860s. The four houses were nearly identical one-story adobe brick cabins with lateral gabled roofs, hip-roofed front porches, and end chimneys.
