= Wilhelmina Nelson House and Cabins =

Historic house in Idaho, United States

- U.S. National Register of Historic Places
- Location within Idaho Location within the United States
- Location: U.S. 89, St. Charles, Idaho
- Coordinates: 42°6′36″N 111°23′15″W
- Area: 9 acres (3.6 ha)
- NRHP reference No.: 76000668
- Added to NRHP: May 3, 1976

The Wilhelmina Nelson House and Cabins, located on U.S. 89 in St. Charles, Idaho were listed on the National Register of Historic Places in 1976.

The listing included four contributing buildings. It includes the Nelson House, built c.1896, a two-story wooden frame L-shaped farmhouse. It includes two log cabins that are similar, with vertical board construction, and a third cabin built before 1876. There are also several farm outbuildings.
