= Ezra Allred Bungalow =

Historic house in Idaho, United States

- U.S. National Register of Historic Places
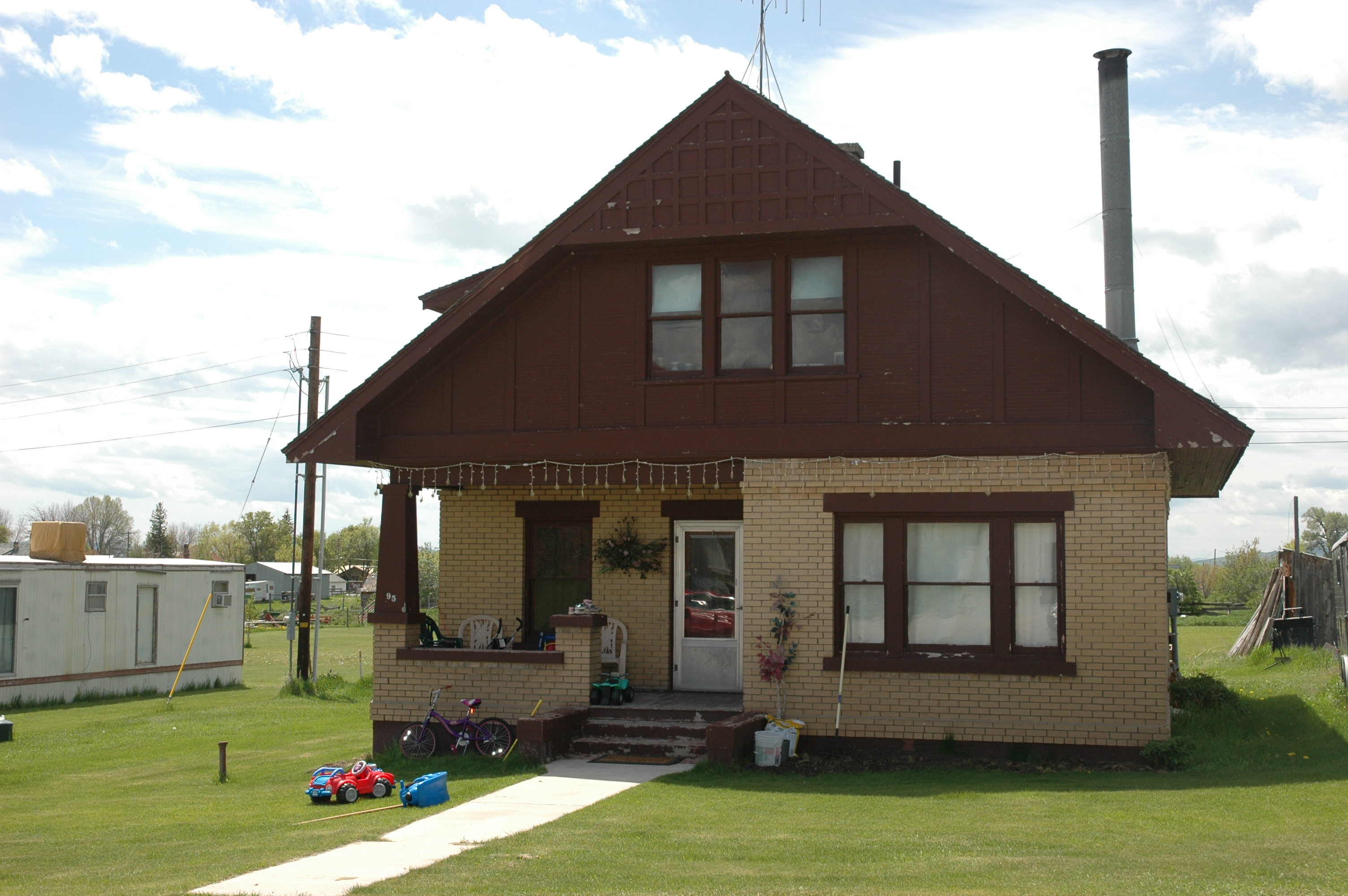

- Location within Idaho Location within the United States
- Location: 93 Center St., Paris, Idaho
- Coordinates: 42°13′36″N 111°24′10″W
- Area: less than one acre
- Built: 1910
- Architectural style: Bungalow/craftsman
- MPS: Paris MRA
- NRHP reference No.: 82000258
- Added to NRHP: November 18, 1982

The Ezra Allred Bungalow in Paris, Idaho was built in 1910. It was listed on the National Register of Historic Places in 1982.

It is a 1 1/2-story brick-and-frame house with a front-facing gable. The brick is buff-colored.

It was deemed significant "as one of Paris' handsomest and most substantial bungalows. It is one of the relatively few in brick; it projects the characteristic features of the bungalow type while retaining a curiously Queen Anne quality in its exhuberant [sic] combination of textures and imaginative fenestration. The use of narrow ceiling and larger strips on the very large gable like that on the similar Fred Price bungalow (site #67) is a bold example of a device pecularily popular in bungalows. The lattice-like gable apron, and the beveled bay, are unique elements."
