= Anna Nielsen Scofield House =

Historic house in Idaho, United States

- U.S. National Register of Historic Places
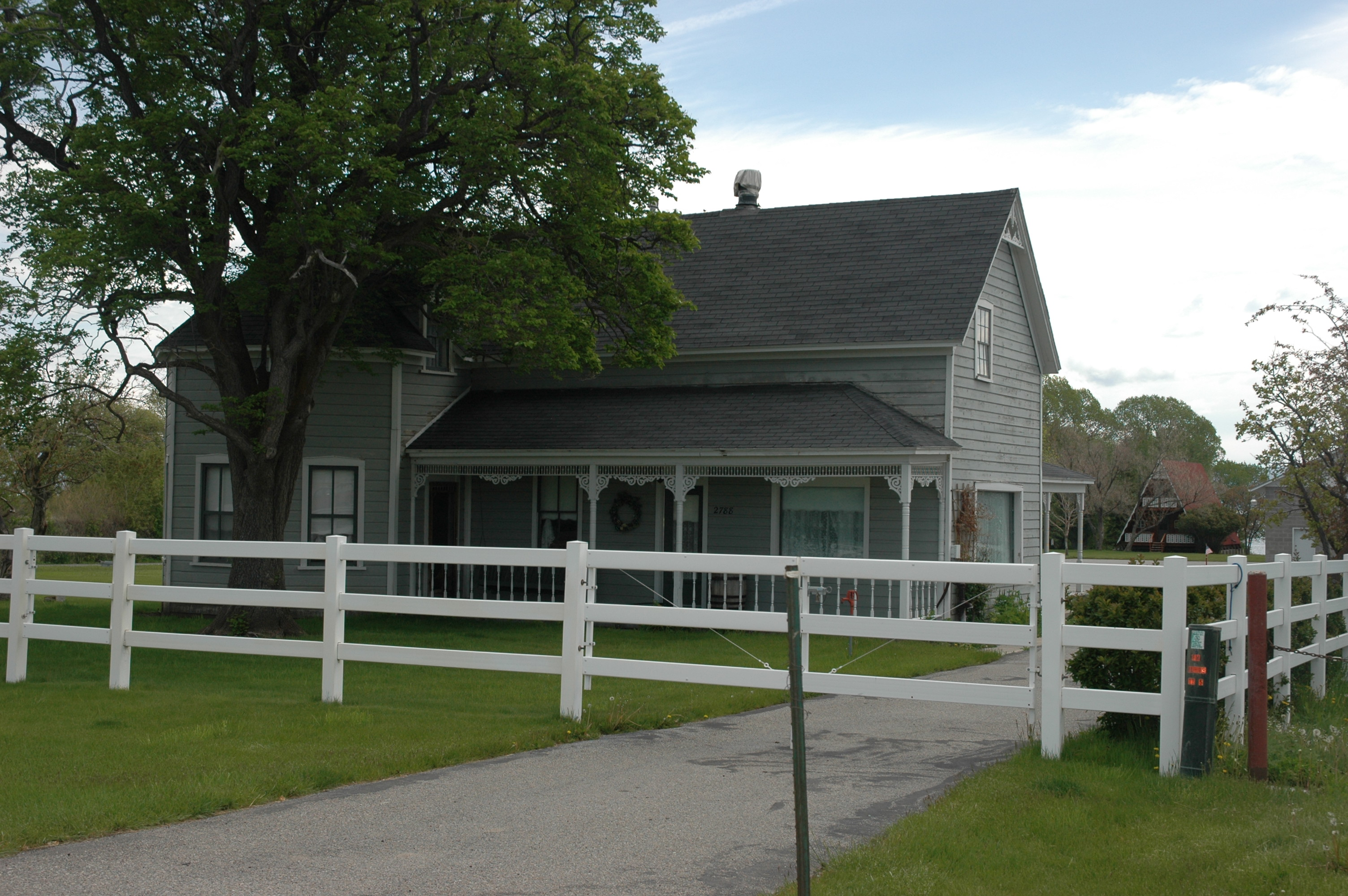

- Location within Idaho Location within the United States
- Location: 2788 U.S. Route 89, Fish Haven, Idaho
- Coordinates: 42°2′18″N 111°23′45″W
- Area: less than one acre
- Built: 1896, c.1910
- Built by: Scofield, Ernest and Hyrum
- Architectural style: Queen Anne
- NRHP reference No.: 99000417
- Added to NRHP: April 1, 1999

The Anna Nielsen Scofield House, located at 2788 U.S. Route 89 in Fish Haven, Idaho, is a historic Queen Anne-style house built in 1896. It was expanded in c. 1910. Also known as the Watts House, it was listed on the National Register of Historic Places in 1999.

It is an irregular-plan balloon-frame house on a brick foundation.

In its NRHP nomination, it was deemed to be "an excellent and locally significant example of a rural Folk Victorian dwelling. It serves to illustrate the evolution of a typical rural dwelling during the prosperity, depression and recovery of the local agricultural economy during the first half of the 20th century. It is also one for the few remaining examples of this type of rural dwelling in its community."
