= William and Nora Ream House =

Historic house in Idaho, United States

- U.S. National Register of Historic Places
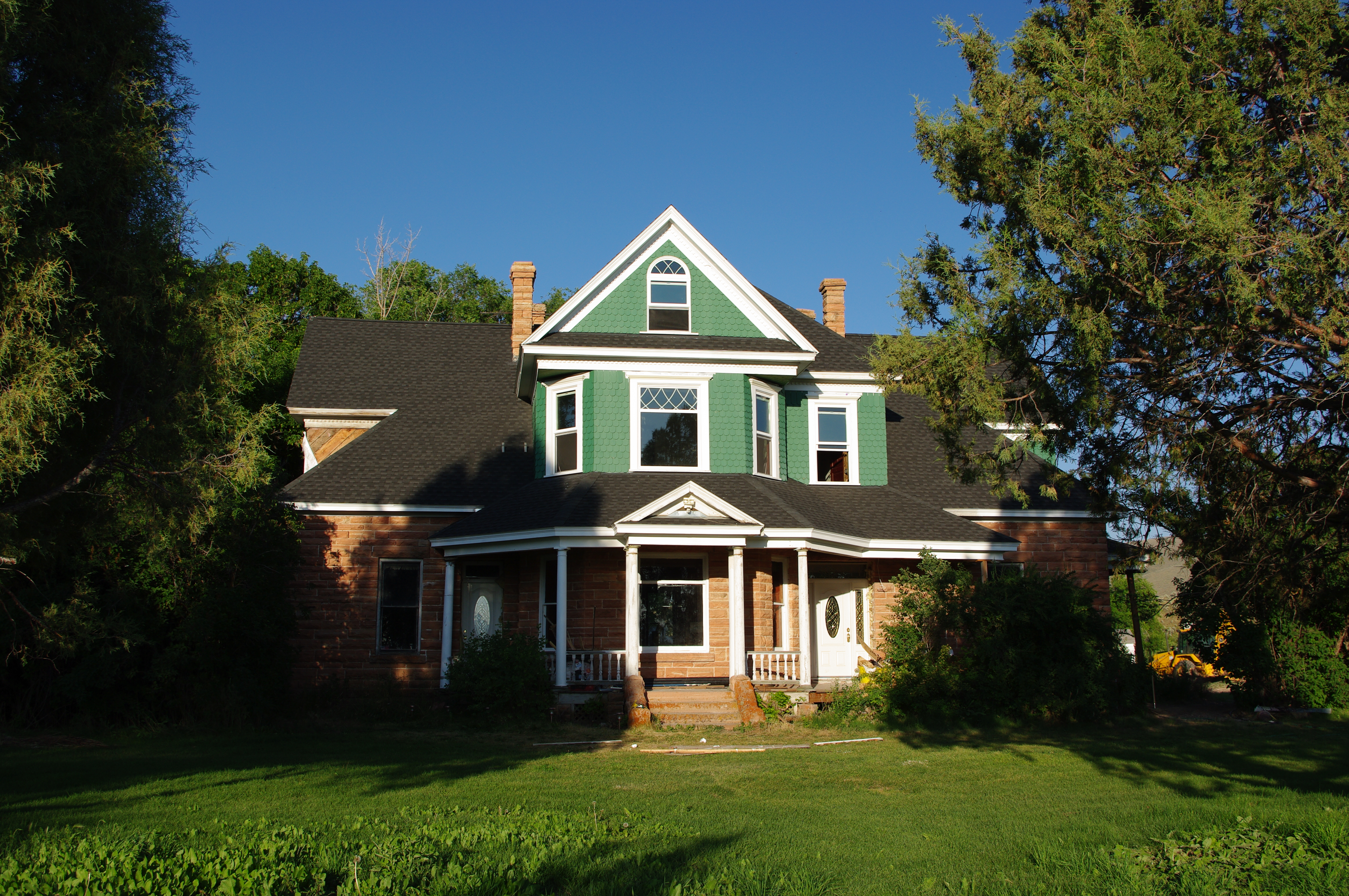

- Location within Idaho Location within the United States
- Location: Dingle Rd. south of Ream Crockett Canal, near Dingle, Idaho
- Coordinates: 42°12′9″N 111°15′58″W
- Area: 2 acres (0.81 ha)
- Built: 1900-1905
- Architectural style: Colonial Revival, queen anne
- NRHP reference No.: 91000460
- Added to NRHP: April 26, 1991

The William and Nora Ream House, near Dingle, Idaho, and also known as Arcadia Farm , was built around 1900. It was listed on the National Register of Historic Places in 1991.

It is a two-and-a-half-story Queen Anne/Colonial Revival house. Built during 1900 to 1905, it is a very late example of a Queen Anne house in which many Colonial Revival elements are included.
