= Georgetown Relief Society Hall =

- U.S. National Register of Historic Places
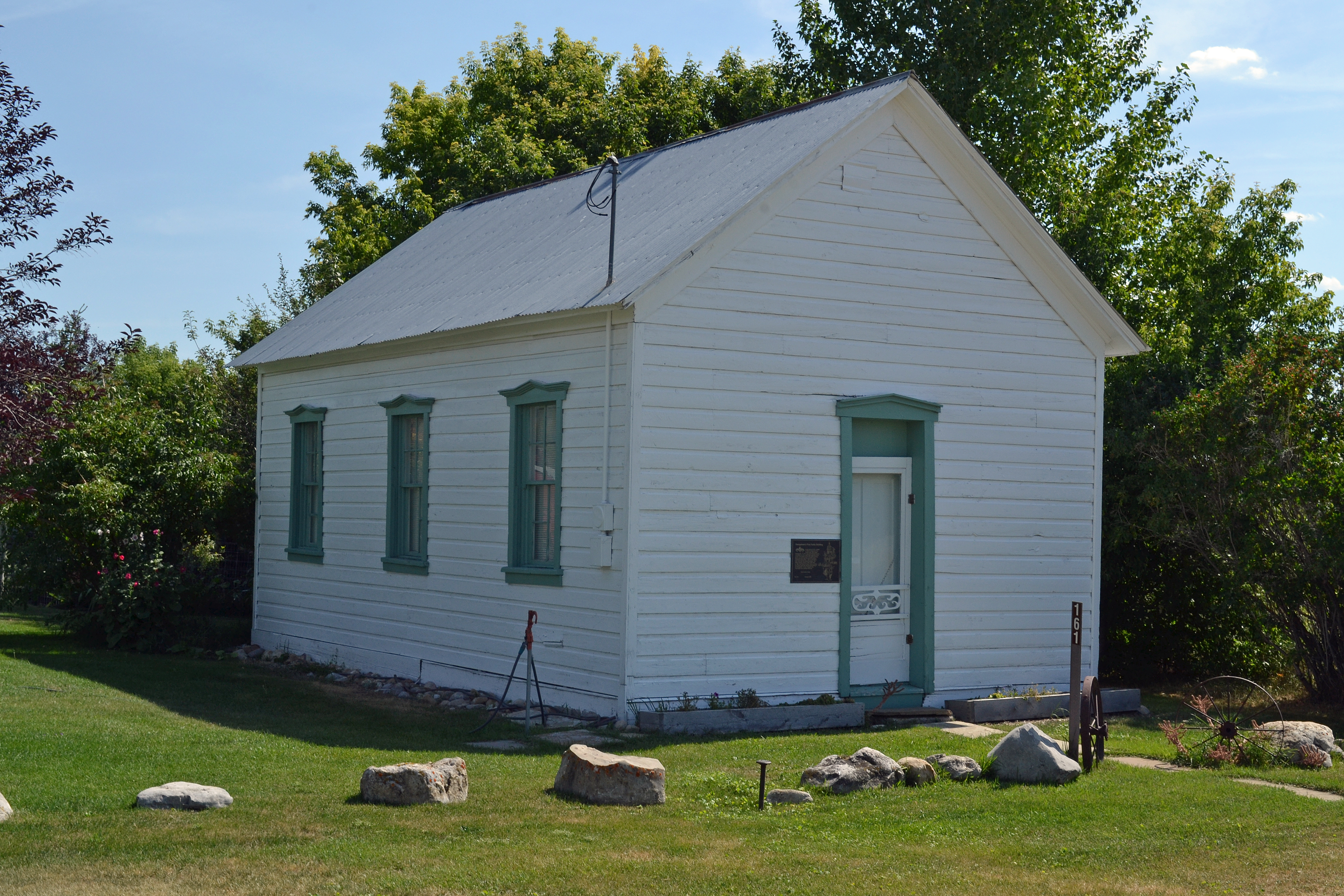

- Location within Idaho Location within the United States
- Location: 161 3rd NW St., Georgetown, Idaho
- Coordinates: 42°28′27″N 111°22′10″W
- Area: less than one acre
- Built: 1872
- NRHP reference No.: 98001171
- Added to NRHP: September 18, 1998

The Georgetown Relief Society Hall in Georgetown, Idaho was built in 1872. It was listed on the National Register of Historic Places in 1998.

It has also been known as the First Public Building, the D.U.P. Hall, and the First LDS Chapel.

It was moved to its current location in 1896.
