= Paris, Idaho =

- City
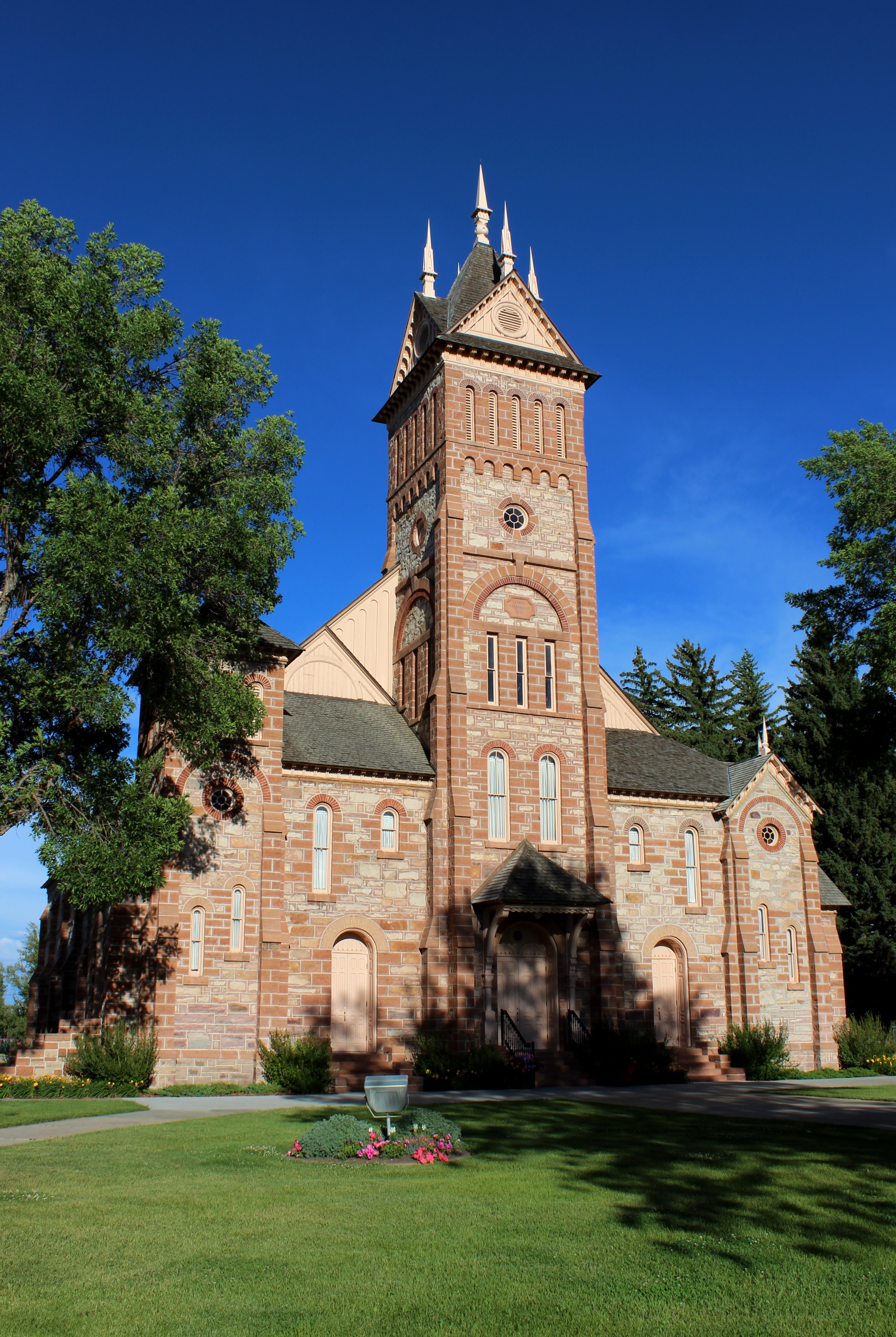
- Stone Tabernacle (Bear Lake Stake Tabernacle), c. 1889

- Location of Paris in Bear Lake County, Idaho.

- Location in the United States
- Coordinates: 42°13′38″N 111°24′12″W
- Country: United States
- State: Idaho
- County: Bear Lake

Area
  - Total: 3.52 sq mi (9.11 km^{2})
  - Land: 3.49 sq mi (9.03 km^{2})
  - Water: 0.027 sq mi (0.07 km^{2})
- Elevation: 5,975 ft (1,821 m)

Population (2020)
  - Total: 541
  - Density: 149.4/sq mi (57.68/km^{2})
- Time zone: UTC-7 (Mountain (MST))
  - Summer (DST): UTC-6 (MDT)
- ZIP codes: 83261, 83287
- Area codes: 208, 986
- FIPS code: 16-60580
- GNIS feature ID: 2411370
- Website: parisidaho.com

Paris is a city in and the county seat of Bear Lake County, Idaho, United States. Located on the western side of the Bear Lake Valley, the city's population was 541 at the 2020 census. Paris was settled on September 26, 1863, by pioneer settlers of the Church of Jesus Christ of Latter-day Saints.

Paris was settled by a group of dedicated Mormons led by Charles C Rich. During the early years, pioneers suffered difficulties with the harsh cold climate.

Paris is the location of the Bear Lake Stake Tabernacle, a sandstone church designed by Joseph Don Carlos Young and built between 1884 and 1889. It seats around 1,400 people.

== History ==
Paris was founded by Mormon pioneers, under the direction of Charles C. Rich on September 29, 1863. The settlers believed the town to be located in Utah until a survey in 1872 showed that it was in Idaho.

== Geography ==
According to the United States Census Bureau, the city has a total area of 3.51 square miles (9.09 km^{2}), of which, 3.48 square miles (9.01 km^{2}) is land and 0.03 square miles (0.08 km^{2}) is water.

Paris lies in a high valley of the Rocky Mountains, at nearly 6,000 feet (1,830 m) in elevation.

=== Climate ===
According to the Köppen climate classification, Paris has a warm-summer humid continental climate (Köppen climate classification: Dfb). Due to the high elevation, cold winters, late springs and mild summers are the norm for Paris and the area. Most of the surrounding country is used for ranching.

Climate data for Paris, Idaho, 1991–2020 simulated normals (5961 ft elevation)
Month	Jan	Feb	Mar	Apr	May	Jun	Jul	Aug	Sep	Oct	Nov	Dec	Year
Mean daily maximum °F (°C)	30.0 (−1.1)	32.7 (0.4)	42.1 (5.6)	52.5 (11.4)	62.6 (17.0)	72.9 (22.7)	82.9 (28.3)	81.9 (27.7)	72.0 (22.2)	57.7 (14.3)	42.6 (5.9)	31.5 (−0.3)	55.1 (12.8)
Daily mean °F (°C)	19.0 (−7.2)	20.8 (−6.2)	30.4 (−0.9)	39.9 (4.4)	49.1 (9.5)	57.7 (14.3)	65.7 (18.7)	64.4 (18.0)	54.9 (12.7)	43.2 (6.2)	31.1 (−0.5)	21.0 (−6.1)	41.4 (5.2)
Mean daily minimum °F (°C)	8.1 (−13.3)	9.0 (−12.8)	18.7 (−7.4)	27.5 (−2.5)	35.6 (2.0)	42.4 (5.8)	48.4 (9.1)	46.9 (8.3)	37.8 (3.2)	28.6 (−1.9)	19.8 (−6.8)	10.6 (−11.9)	27.8 (−2.3)
Average precipitation inches (mm)	1.66 (42.05)	1.43 (36.27)	1.27 (32.27)	1.47 (37.34)	2.02 (51.41)	1.16 (29.38)	0.63 (15.90)	0.84 (21.42)	1.24 (31.46)	1.40 (35.60)	1.19 (30.23)	1.45 (36.87)	15.76 (400.2)
Average dew point °F (°C)	11.8 (−11.2)	13.3 (−10.4)	20.8 (−6.2)	25.5 (−3.6)	32.7 (0.4)	37.8 (3.2)	41.4 (5.2)	38.7 (3.7)	32.9 (0.5)	26.4 (−3.1)	20.3 (−6.5)	13.8 (−10.1)	26.3 (−3.2)
Source: Prism Climate Group

== Demographics ==
Historical population
Census	Pop.	Note	%±
1880	611		—
1890	893		46.2%
1900	906		1.5%
1910	1,038		14.6%
1930	825		—
1940	932		13.0%
1950	774		−17.0%
1960	746		−3.6%
1970	615		−17.6%
1980	707		15.0%
1990	581		−17.8%
2000	576		−0.9%
2010	513		−10.9%
2020	541		5.5%
U.S. Decennial Census

=== 2010 census ===
As of the census of 2010, there were 513 people, 202 households, and 144 families living in the city. The population density was 147.4 inhabitants per square mile (56.9/km^{2}). There were 299 housing units at an average density of 85.9 per square mile (33.2/km^{2}). The racial makeup of the city was 97.9% White, 0.4% African American, 0.2% Asian, 0.6% from other races, and 1.0% from two or more races. Hispanic or Latino of any race were 2.3% of the population.

There were 202 households, of which 27.7% had children under the age of 18 living with them, 64.4% were married couples living together, 4.5% had a female householder with no husband present, 2.5% had a male householder with no wife present, and 28.7% were non-families. 26.2% of all households were made up of individuals, and 12.4% had someone living alone who was 65 years of age or older. The average household size was 2.54 and the average family size was 3.11.

The median age in the city was 40.2 years. 27.1% of residents were under the age of 18; 5.7% were between the ages of 18 and 24; 22.9% were from 25 to 44; 27.9% were from 45 to 64; and 16.6% were 65 years of age or older. The gender makeup of the city was 51.5% male and 48.5% female.

=== 2000 census ===
As of the census of 2000, there were 576 people, 218 households, and 168 families living in the city. The population density was 165.2 inhabitants per square mile (63.8/km^{2}). There were 292 housing units at an average density of 83.7 per square mile (32.3/km^{2}). The racial makeup of the city was 99.13% White, 0.35% African American, 0.17% Native American, 0.35% from other races. Hispanic or Latino of any race were 0.69% of the population.

There were 218 households, out of which 37.6% had children under the age of 18 living with them, 71.1% were married couples living together, 4.6% had a female householder with no husband present, and 22.5% were non-families. 22.0% of all households were made up of individuals, and 12.8% had someone living alone who was 65 years of age or older. The average household size was 2.64 and the average family size was 3.09.

In the city, the population was spread out, with 30.7% under the age of 18, 7.6% from 18 to 24, 21.0% from 25 to 44, 24.5% from 45 to 64, and 16.1% who were 65 years of age or older. The median age was 38 years. For every 100 females, there were 93.3 males. For every 100 females age 18 and over, there were 95.6 males.

The median income for a household in the city was $40,341, and the median income for a family was $45,000. Males had a median income of $32,500 versus $20,313 for females. The per capita income for the city was $15,725. About 3.8% of families and 6.2% of the population were below the poverty line, including 5.0% of those under age 18 and 11.9% of those age 65 or over.

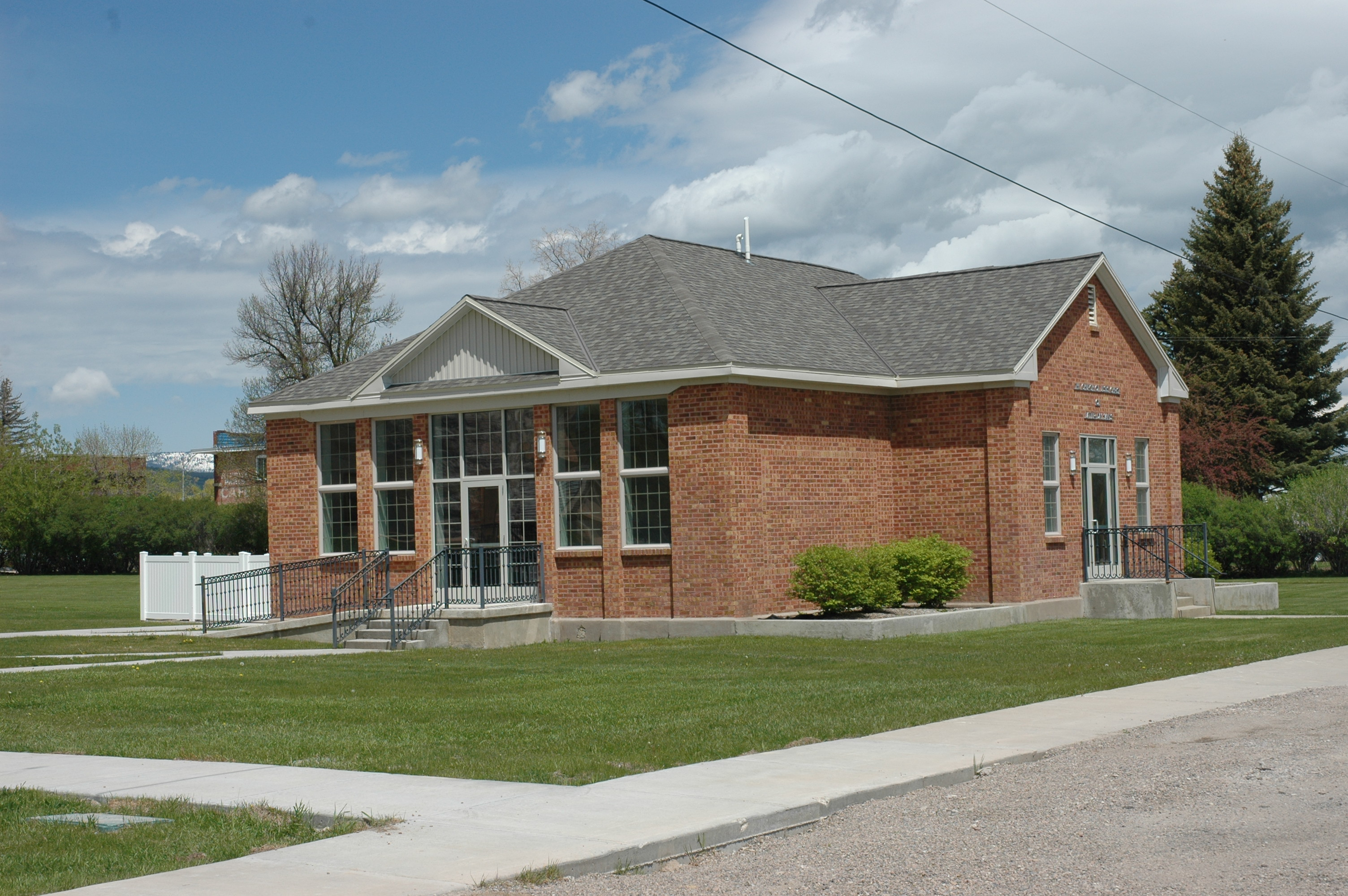
The Church of Jesus Christ of Latter-day Saints Seminary in Paris

== Arts and culture ==
The Paris July 4 Celebration is the big event of the year, a tradition that brings people from miles around. Starting off with the KVSI fun run (8.6 miles) from the KVSI radio station in Montpelier, and ending in Paris where the City of Paris chuck wagon breakfast is held at the finish line. The Bear Lake Pageant is held at the Paris Tabernacle, followed by a parade that runs through the city. The event concludes with a youth rodeo at the Paris rodeo grounds.

== Paleontology ==
The rocks west of Paris produce fossils of different organisms. A well-known paleontological site is recognized from Paris Canyon, from where a diverse fauna was described and named in 2017, the Paris biota.

== Infrastructure ==
- - U.S. Route 89, to Montpelier (northeast) and Logan, Utah (southwest)

== Notable people ==
- Arthur Shepherd (1880–1958), composer
