= Utah State Legislature =

Legislative branch of the state government of Utah

- 66th Utah State Legislature

Type
- Type: Bicameral
- Houses: Senate; House of Representatives

Leadership
- Senate President: Stuart Adams (R) since January 28, 2019
- House Speaker: Mike Schultz (R) since November 15, 2023

Structure
- Seats: 104 (29 senators, 75 representatives)
- Senate political groups: Republican (22); Democratic (6); Forward (1)
- House political groups: Republican (61); Democratic (14)

Elections
- Last Senate election: November 5, 2024
- Last House election: November 5, 2024

Meeting place
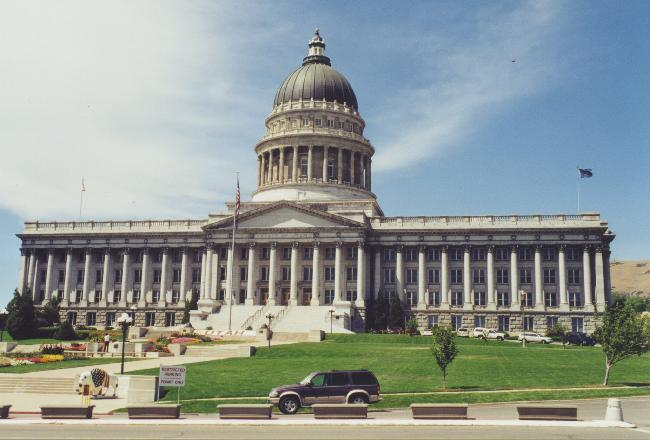
- Utah State Capitol; Salt Lake City

Website
- le.utah.gov

The Utah State Legislature is the state legislature of the U.S. state of Utah. It is a bicameral body, comprising the Utah House of Representatives, with 75 state representatives, and the Utah Senate, with 29 state senators. There are no term limits for either chamber.

The Legislature convenes at the Utah State Capitol in the state capital of Salt Lake City. In 2020, voters approved an amendment to the state constitution that changed the legislative start date from a constitutionally mandated fourth Monday of January to a date set by state law (thereby making it easier to change the start date if necessary). Current state law requires the start date of the Utah State Legislature to be the first Tuesday after the third Monday in January for an annual 45-day session.

== Overview ==
The Utah State Legislature meets in the Utah State Capitol in Salt Lake City. The Republicans currently have super-majorities in both the House and Senate. They control the House by a margin of 59–16 and the Senate by 22–6–1. The current Senate President is Stuart Adams (R), and the Speaker of the House is Brad Wilson (R).

=== Districts ===
The state is divided into 29 Senate districts, each representing approximately 77,000 people and the House is divided into 75 House districts, each representing approximately 29,800 people. Senate districts overlap House districts allowing two legislators for each constituency in Utah.

=== Terms and qualifications ===
Senators are elected to a four-year term, and Representatives to a two-year term. All state House districts and half of all state Senate districts are up for election every two years. To be eligible for the office of a state senator or representative, a person must be a citizen of the United States, be at least 25 years of age, be a qualified voter in the district from which elected, and must be a resident of the State of Utah for three years and a resident of the district from which elected for six months. There are no term limitations for either the Utah House of Representatives or the Utah Senate.

=== Sessions ===
The annual General Session is held for 45 calendar days, convening on the fourth Monday in January. The General Session must conclude by midnight on the 45th day according to the Utah State Constitution. The Governor may by proclamation convene the Legislature in Special Session, to transact legislative business, but no legislative business can be conducted except that which is expressed in the proclamation or other legislative business that the Governor shall call attention to. These special sessions, except in the cases of impeachment, cannot exceed 30 calendar days. The House may convene for the purpose of impeachment if two-thirds of the members are in favor of convening for that purpose. The Speaker of the House shall determine by poll whether there is a sufficient number of members to convene for an Impeachment Session outside the General Session. If the House impeaches an official, the Senate is required to convene to try that impeachment.

== History ==
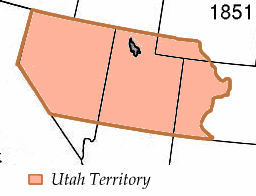
Utah Territory in 1851

=== Utah Territorial Assembly ===
The Utah Territory was established by an act of Congress on Monday, September 9, 1850 which provided for a territorial government made up of a governor chosen every four years, a Legislative Assembly with a 13-member Council chosen every second year and a 26-member House of Representatives chosen annually, and a judiciary consisting of a Supreme Court, District Courts, Probate Courts, and justices of the peace. The creation of the Territory of Utah was part of the Compromise of 1850 seeking to preserve the political balance of power between the slave and free states.

Following the organization of the territory, Brigham Young was inaugurated as its first governor on Sunday, February 9, 1851 and the first territorial assembly met Monday, September 22, 1851. The legislative body of the Utah Territory continued to act until 1896 with the successful passage of the Utah Constitution and Utah achieving statehood. The first President of the Utah Territorial Council was Willard Richards and the first Territorial Speaker of the House was William W. Phelps. In 1870, the length of a Representative's term was extended to two years, and in 1896 the Utah Territorial Council became the Utah Senate with a four-year term.

=== Petitions for statehood ===
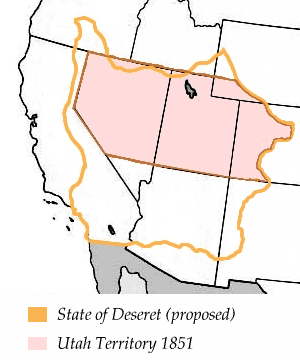
The boundaries of the provisional State of Deseret (orange) as proposed in 1849. The area of the Utah Territory as organized in 1850 is shaded in pink.

Utah first petitioned for statehood starting in 1849, and a constitutional convention was called to draft a State Constitution for a proposed State of Deseret on March 8, 1849 to be held in Salt Lake City. The U.S. House of Representatives and Senate rejected the proposed state and followed up the rejection by creating the Territory of Utah. It wasn't for another six years before the Fifth Territorial Legislature passed an act on December 10, 1855 establishing a constitutional convention to make a second attempt at Statehood. This second constitutional convention was held on March 17, 1856 in Salt Lake City and a proposed constitution was created which was subsequently rejected by the U.S. Congress.

A third constitutional convention was held on January 20, 1862 in Salt Lake City and a proposed constitution was drafted and subsequently submitted to the U.S. Congress which rejected the petition for statehood. The Twentieth Territorial Legislature on January 31, 1872 would call for a fourth constitutional convention and again petitioned Congress for statehood yet this effort also failed and it was not until April and May 1882 that a fifth and final attempt at statehood was made prior to Congress passing the Utah Enabling Act in 1894.

The Utah Territory proceeded to hold a constitutional convention on March 4, 1895 which ended on March 6, 1895 and the proposed Constitution was ratified by the voters Tuesday, November 5, 1895. The first election was also held on this day and state officials were elected. The First Utah State Legislature convened on January 13, 1896 and proceeded to conduct the business of organizing the state.

== Composition of Senate ==
The current party composition of the Utah Senate is:

Affiliation	Members
Republican Party	22
Democratic Party	6
Forward Party	1
Total	29
Majority	14

== Composition of House of Representatives ==
The current party composition of the Utah House is:

Affiliation	Members
Republican Party	61
Democratic Party	14
Total	75
Majority	38

== Structure and organization ==
The Utah Legislature is a bicameral, partisan body composed of a lower chamber which is the Utah House of Representatives with 75 members, and upper chamber which is the Utah Senate, with 29 members. State senators serve four-year terms with half the seats in the Utah Senate being up for election every two years and state representatives serve two-year terms with all the seats in the Utah House being up for election every two years. Each body elects its own leadership and is responsible for determining its own rules of procedures.

The members of both houses of the Utah Legislature are elected on a partisan basis, and they conduct their proceedings including the elections of leadership according to membership in a party caucus. Currently, the state of Nebraska is the only state in the United States that is elected and conducted in a nonpartisan manner.

As of 2016, 88 percent of members of the Utah Legislature were affiliated with the Church of Jesus Christ of Latter-day Saints.

=== Committees and leadership ===
The Utah Senate elects a president of the Senate and the Utah House elects a speaker, and each political party caucus in both houses elects party leadership including a majority leader, majority whip and assistant majority whip by the caucus with the most members in that house. The minority party caucus elects a minority leader, minority whip, assistant minority whip and includes one additional leadership position of minority caucus manager to offset the Speaker of the House and President of the Senate who are traditionally members of the majority caucus yet are elected by the entire membership of their respective bodies.

Legislative committees serve an important function in the legislative process, as the majority of the debate and discussion of a bill is done in committee and public comment is generally accepted at this point in the bill process. Amendments can be made to the bill and be given more consideration than they would on the floor of either legislative chamber. Utah has three types of legislative committees, these are: appropriations subcommittees, standing committees and interim committees.

==== Appropriations subcommittees ====
There are eight appropriations subcommittees made up of members of both the Utah House of Representatives and Utah Senate. These subcommittees are responsible for reviewing a section of the budget and requests for appropriations. At the end of this review, the subcommittees submit its portion of the budget and a recommended list of prioritized appropriations on to the Executive Appropriations Committee, which is composed of party leadership from both chambers. All alterations to the budget, including all appropriations, are approved by this committee, which are then turned into the so-called "Bill of Bills" at the end of the session.

==== Standing committees ====
There are eleven Utah Senate standing committees and fifteen Utah House of Representatives standing committees. A standing committee can take the following actions on a bill after it is assigned to the committee: amend the bill, hold the bill, table the bill, return the bill to the Senate Rules Committee, substitute the bill, vote the bill out of committee with a favorable recommendation, or vote the bill out of committee with an unfavorable recommendation.

==== Interim committees ====
Interim committees fulfill essentially the same functions as standing committees and are differentiated from standing committees in that they meet during the interim between legislative sessions to discuss bills, to study issues, and to recommend bills for consideration. Interim committees may take the same actions on a bill as a standing committee.

== Capitol buildings ==
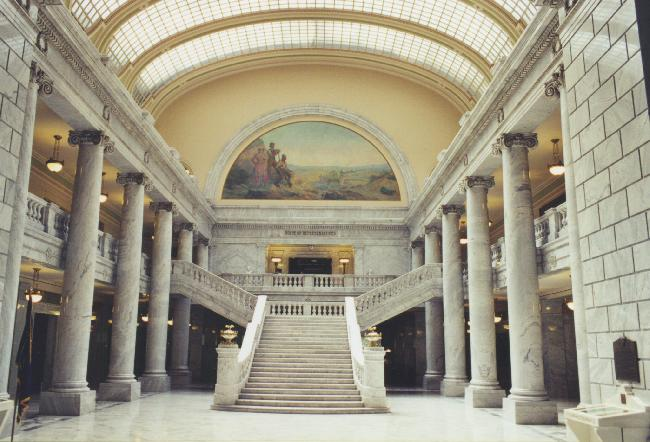
Inside the Utah State Capitol in 2002

Over the years there have been many changes to the structure of the legislature, the number of Senators and Representatives, and the location of the Capitol building. Early on, the Council House served as a meeting place for the Utah Territorial Legislative Assembly. In 1851, the assembly designated Fillmore in Millard County as the capital city and ordered construction of a capitol building.

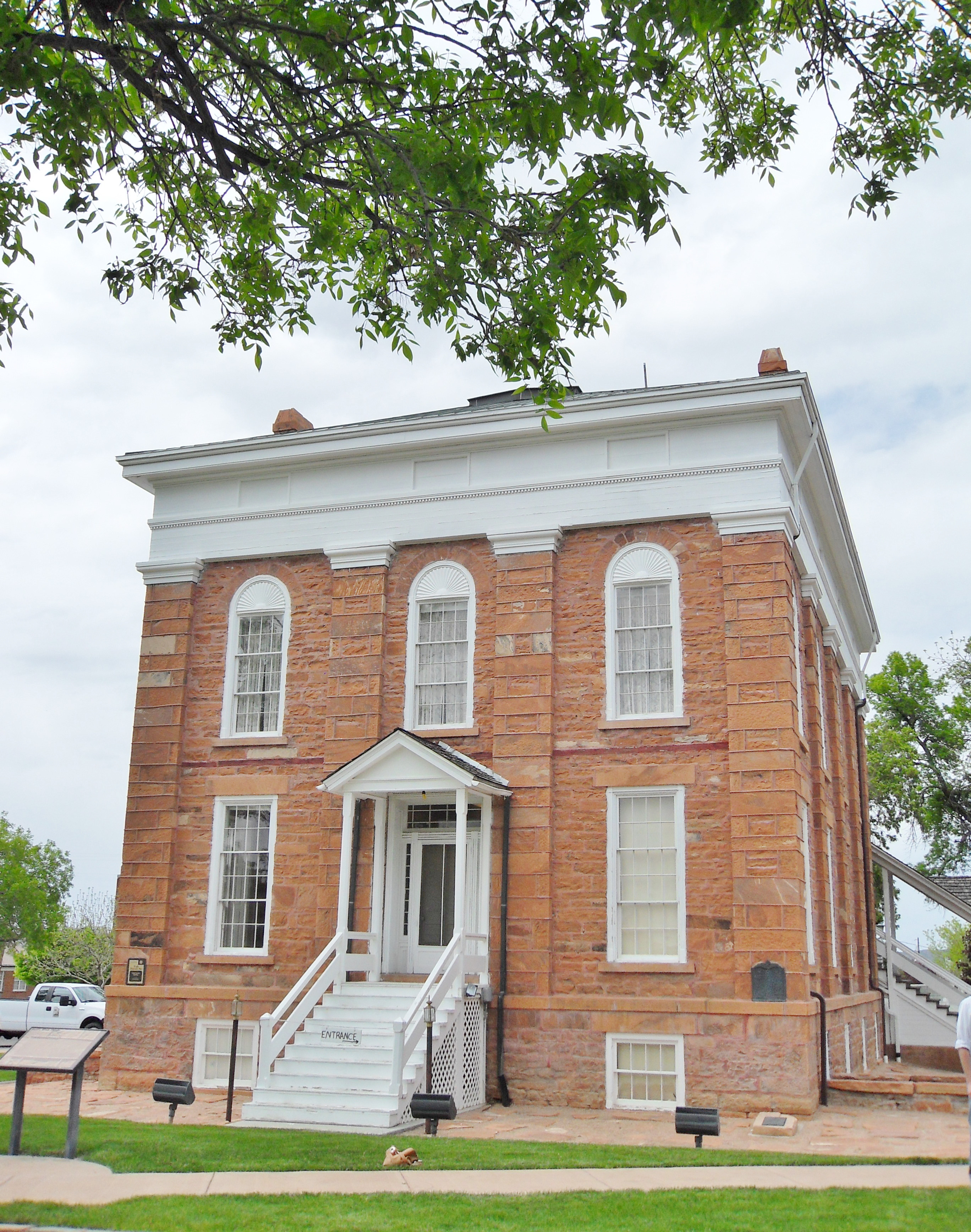
The Utah Territorial Statehouse in Fillmore

In 1856, the Fillmore Capitol was abandoned and the assembly met in Salt Lake City at various locations including: the Council House, the Social Hall, the old Salt Lake County Courthouse (at Second South and Second West streets), the old Salt Lake City Hall, and the present Salt Lake City and County Building. The Industrial Christian Home for Polygamous Wives also provided office space for officials.

After, being admitted to the Union as a State on January 4, 1896 by an act signed into law by President Grover Cleveland, the first official act of statehood was the swearing in of State officials at the Salt Lake Tabernacle on January 6, 1896, as Utah did not have an official State Capitol. Acting upon the recommendation of Governor John C. Cutler, the Utah Legislature finally approved a plan to build a State Capitol in 1909. Construction on the Capitol did not start until December 26, 1912, and it was not completed and dedicated until October 9, 1916.

The Utah Capitol Building underwent renovations and seismic upgrades from 2002 to 2008. The State Legislature met in the West Administration Building at the Capitol Complex while the Governor's and Lt. Governor's Offices were located in the East Administration Building during the time of renovation.

== See also ==
- List of Utah state legislatures
- Utah Capitol
- Utah House of Representatives
- Utah Senate
- Utah Transfer of Public Lands Act
- Utah's congressional delegations for federal legislators
