= Utah Schools for the Deaf and the Blind =

School in Ogden, Utah, United States

Coordinates: 41°15′04″N 111°56′45″W

Agency overview
- Formed: 1884
- Parent agency: Utah State Board of Education
- Website: https://www.usdb.org/

Utah Schools for the Deaf and the Blind (USDB) is a state education agency of Utah that educates blind and deaf children. It includes a day and boarding school in Ogden, which houses the USDB headquarters, and sites in Salt Lake City and Springville.

== History ==
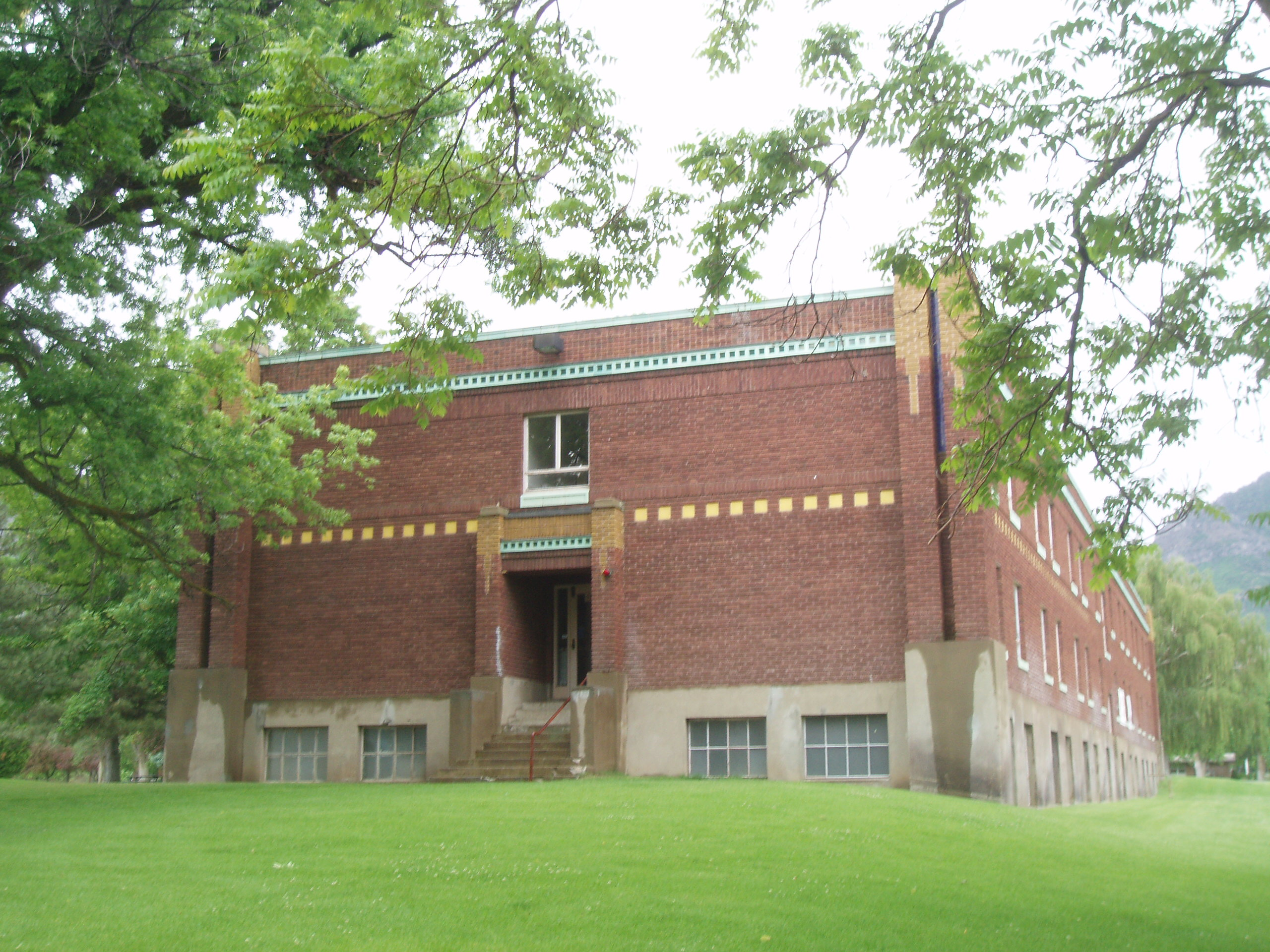
Old boys' dormitory that has since been torn down

USDB traces its history back to 1884, when the Utah Territorial Legislative Assembly established a school for the deaf as a department of the University of Deseret (today known as the University of Utah). One student, Elizabeth Wood, was in attendance on the day it opened in a room in the university's newly constructed building on Union Square in downtown Salt Lake City. In 1888, the legislature passed an enabling act, officially establishing the Institution of Deaf-Mutes as a branch of the university and in 1890, the institute moved into its own, newly constructed building, also on Union Square.

In the early 1890s, there were several attempts to separate the school from the university as they had little in common. At least two attempts were made, one to move the school to the former Fort Cameron site in Central Utah and another to move the school to the recently closed The Industrial Christian Home for Polygamous Wives in Salt Lake City; both attempts failed. In 1894, the legislature established a school for the blind and in 1896, the two schools became independent from the university and were moved to a new home at the former Reform School in Ogden, Utah.

In 1994, the Utah Board of Education made Lee W. Robinson the superintendent of the school.

== Campuses ==
The C. Mark Openshaw Education Center in Millcreek, Utah

The former Jean Massieu School for the Deaf in Millcreek

The Ogden campus has the Kenneth Burdett School for the Deaf and a School for the Blind, with about 50 students total. The USBD main administrative offices are located at the Ogden campus. This campus has dormitories, that the school refers to as "the Cottages", which are used for graduated students who need help transitioning into a world designed for the hearing and seeing. Students can stay in them until they reach the age of 22. The USDB states they can house "A very limited number of students". In the 1980s, Ogden used to host boarders of all ages at the deaf school, though some students stayed with host families.

The Jean Massieu School of the Deaf in Salt Lake City integrated into the USDB after being founded as a charter school in 1999.

The Elizabeth DeLong School of the Springville Campus is in Springville. Its construction began in March 2019 and was completed in October 2020. Jacoby Architects designed the school, which cost $13 million.

== Transportation ==
In 1997 USDB gave a contract to Wasatch Transportation for school transportation services, leading to a protest from Quality Busing, their previous contracted service, which was not awarded the contract.
