= Bear Lake County Courthouse =

- U.S. National Register of Historic Places
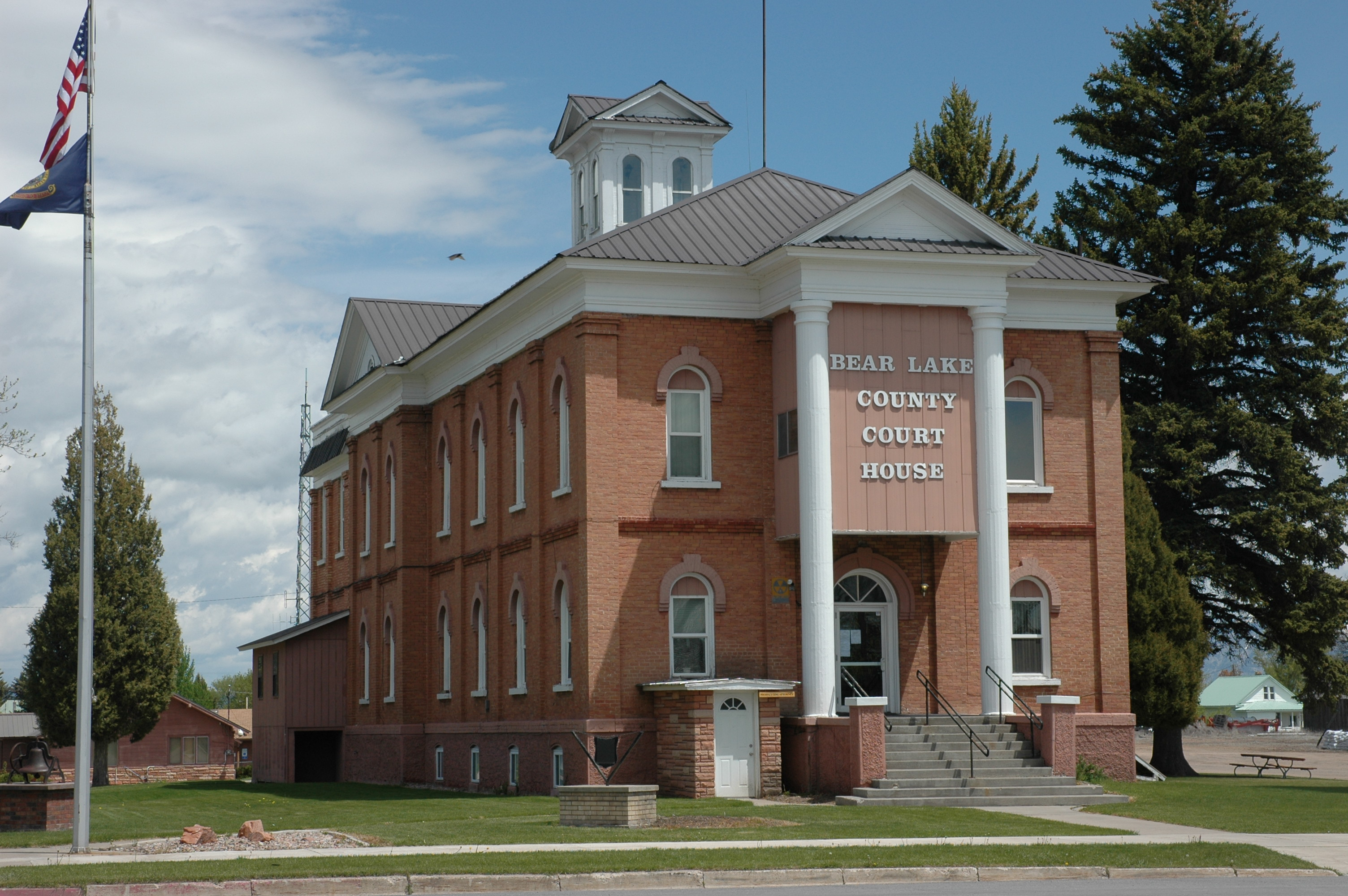

- Location within Idaho Location within the United States
- Location: 7 E. Center St, Paris, Idaho
- Coordinates: 42.2272°N 111.4006°W
- Area: less than one acre
- Built: 1884–85
- Built by: T.O. Angell
- Architectural style: Late 19th and 20th Century Revivals, Italian Renaissance Revival
- Demolished: 2021
- NRHP reference No.: 77000454
- Added to NRHP: October 7, 1977

The Bear Lake County Courthouse, located in Paris, was the county courthouse serving Bear Lake County, Idaho. Built in 1884–85, the building was one of Idaho's oldest county courthouses. Architect Truman O. Angell designed the building in the Italian Renaissance Revival style. The front entrance to the building had a two-story portico supported by Doric columns and topped by a pediment. A square cupola with bracketed pediments on each side topped the building's hipped roof.

The courthouse was listed on the National Register of Historic Places in 1977.

This courthouse was replaced by a new one in summer 2020. Despite efforts by state and local historical societies to preserve the courthouse, the county commission decided to spend $200,000+ to have it demolished on February 22, 2021.
