= St. George Utah Temple =

Latter-day Saint Temple in St. George, Utah

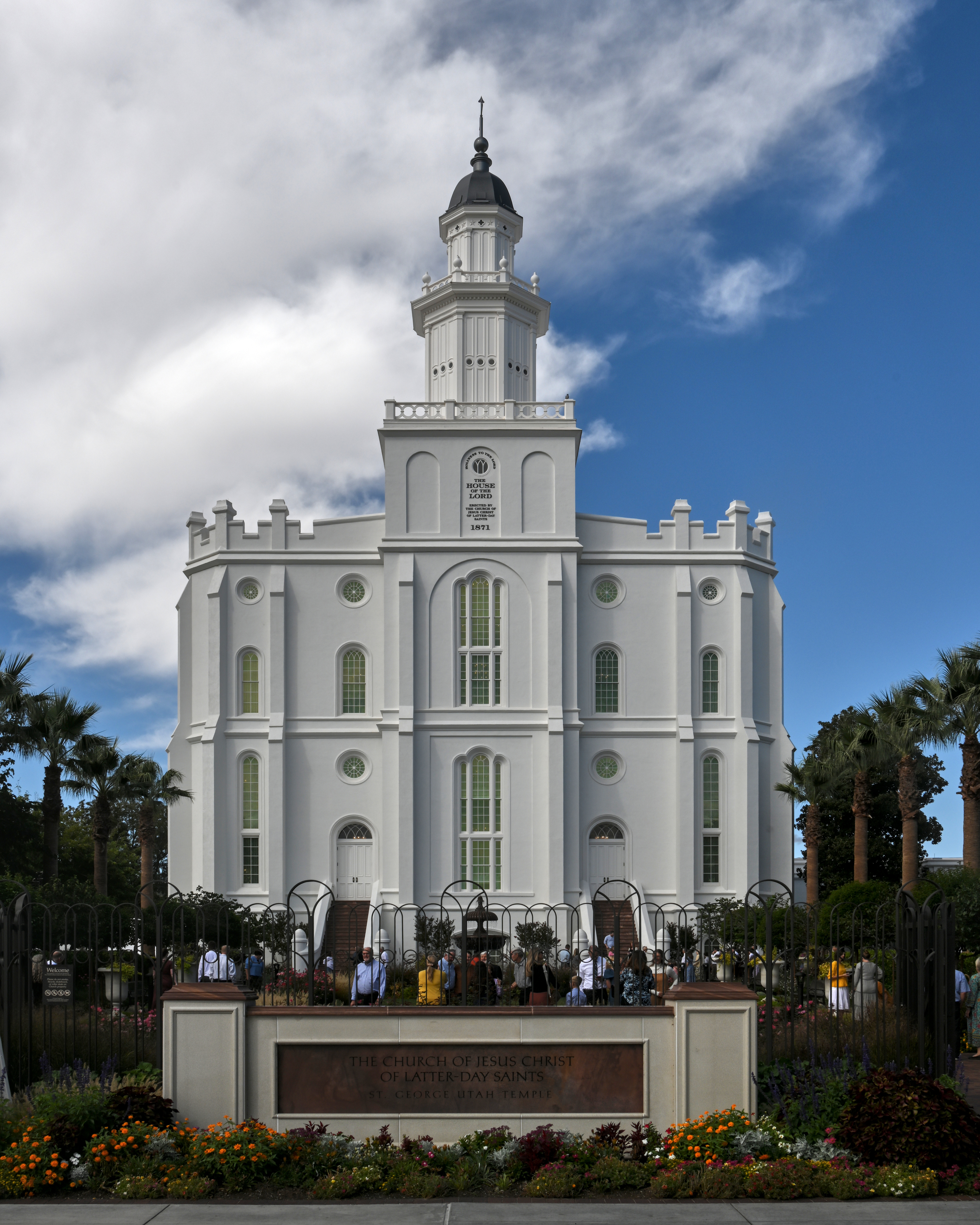
- Interactive map of St. George Utah Temple
- Number: 1
- Dedication: April 6, 1877, by Daniel H. Wells
- Site: 6.5 acres (2.6 ha)
- Floor area: 143,969 ft^{2} (13,375.2 m^{2})
- Height: 80 ft (24 m)
- Official website • News & images

Church chronology
| ← Nauvoo Temple | St. George Utah Temple | → Logan Utah Temple |

Additional information
- Announced: January 31, 1871, by Brigham Young
- Groundbreaking: November 9, 1871, by Brigham Young
- Open house: October 15–25, 1975 (after renovations); September 15 – November 11, 2023
- Rededicated: November 11, 1975, by Spencer W. Kimball; December 10, 2023, by Jeffrey R. Holland
- Designed by: Truman O. Angell
- Location: St. George, Utah, United States
- Coordinates: 37°6′2″N 113°34′41″W
- Exterior finish: Native red sandstone quarried from a hill to the north and plastered white.
- Design: Castellated Neo-Gothic
- Baptistries: 1
- Ordinance rooms: 3 (stationary)
- Sealing rooms: 18
- Clothing rental: Available
- Visitors' center: Yes

The St. George Utah Temple, formerly known as the St. George Temple, is a temple of the Church of Jesus Christ of Latter-day Saints, in St. George, Utah, United States. After the death of Joseph Smith, whom they considered to be a prophet, Mormon pioneers migrated west. They were later directed by his successor, Brigham Young, to settle in southwestern Utah and where this temple was completed in March 1877. It was the church's first completed in Utah, to meet an immediate need to conduct temple ceremonies.

The temple was built over swampy land. Workers created a dry foundation by using a cannon (with a debated origin), which they lifted thirty feet to use as a pile driver for compacting the foundation. For more than six years, members willingly contributed to the temple, which included daily travel to the work site, and dedicating one day out of ten as a form of tithing labor. Brigham Young, the church president, considered the completed cupola too short. Two years after he died, a lightning strike razed the tower, and the reconstructed height of the tower was doubled to his desired height. It is the oldest temple in active use by the church and the only one completed during Young's tenure.

In August 1877, Wilford Woodruff, then the temple president, recorded that the spirits of "eminent" historical figures manifested themselves to him in the temple and requested that ordinances be performed on their behalf. These were recorded by Woodruff over the span of two days and nights, which lead to proxy baptisms and endowment ceremonies being performed for 100 historical men and women.

Truman O. Angell designed the temple with interior structural similarities to the Kirtland and Nauvoo temples. It has exterior elements that give it the appearance of a fortified castle. It has three ordinance rooms and 18 sealing rooms, covering a total floor area of 143,969 square feet (13,400 m^{2}). Its architectural style combines Neo-Gothic and French Norman Revival design. Dedicated in April 1877, the St. George Temple was the first where members could complete all temple ordinances for the dead. The temple has gone through ten major renovations throughout its history. Only church members with a current temple recommend may enter, while the nearby visitors' center is open to the public.

== History ==
As part of a "cotton mission", an initiative announced during general conference, 309 men and their families were called upon to bolster the regional economy through cotton production, to settle the area that became St. George. Bruce C. Hafen has said of those assembled that there were "mixed emotions", as this was the first that they had heard about it. Andrew Karl Larson wrote of the event that the groups response resembled a comment and a shout of apostle Erastus Snow: "Glory! Hallelujah!" Hafen also described that this response was characteristic of those called to live in the area. The settlement period posed challenges of starvation and economic hardship.

=== Planning ===
Brigham Young, the second church president, called a special meeting on January 31, 1871, in which he proposed the idea of constructing a temple in St. George. This was agreed to with a unanimous vote. Projects in the area were still underway, such as the St. George Tabernacle. The temple's site dedication and groundbreaking ceremony was held on November 9, 1871. Young selected St. George for the temple's location due to the presence of loyal area church members and a desire to unify a region considered challenging to settle. The temple's construction provided both employment and a source of economic stability. Because the area had a similar climate to the deep south and was intended to grow cotton, the members began to call it Utah's "Dixie".

At the time of the St. George Temple's announcement, the Salt Lake Temple was still in the early stages of construction and would not be completed until 1893. The St. George Temple met an immediate need for a place to conduct temple ceremonies. The temple became the third completed by the church (besides the Kirtland and Nauvoo temples) and the first in Utah following the member migration westward after the death of church founder Joseph Smith. It is the first in the list of operating temples. The St. George Temple was the first place where the endowment was performed on behalf of deceased individuals, also making it the first temple where all temple ordinances could be performed for the dead, and the opening of this temple renewed the practice of sealings on behalf of deceased individuals (since the migration from Nauvoo). Up until this point, the wording of the temple ordinances were given verbally and by memory until the St. George Temple was dedicated, where the ordinances were written down for the first time.

=== Construction ===
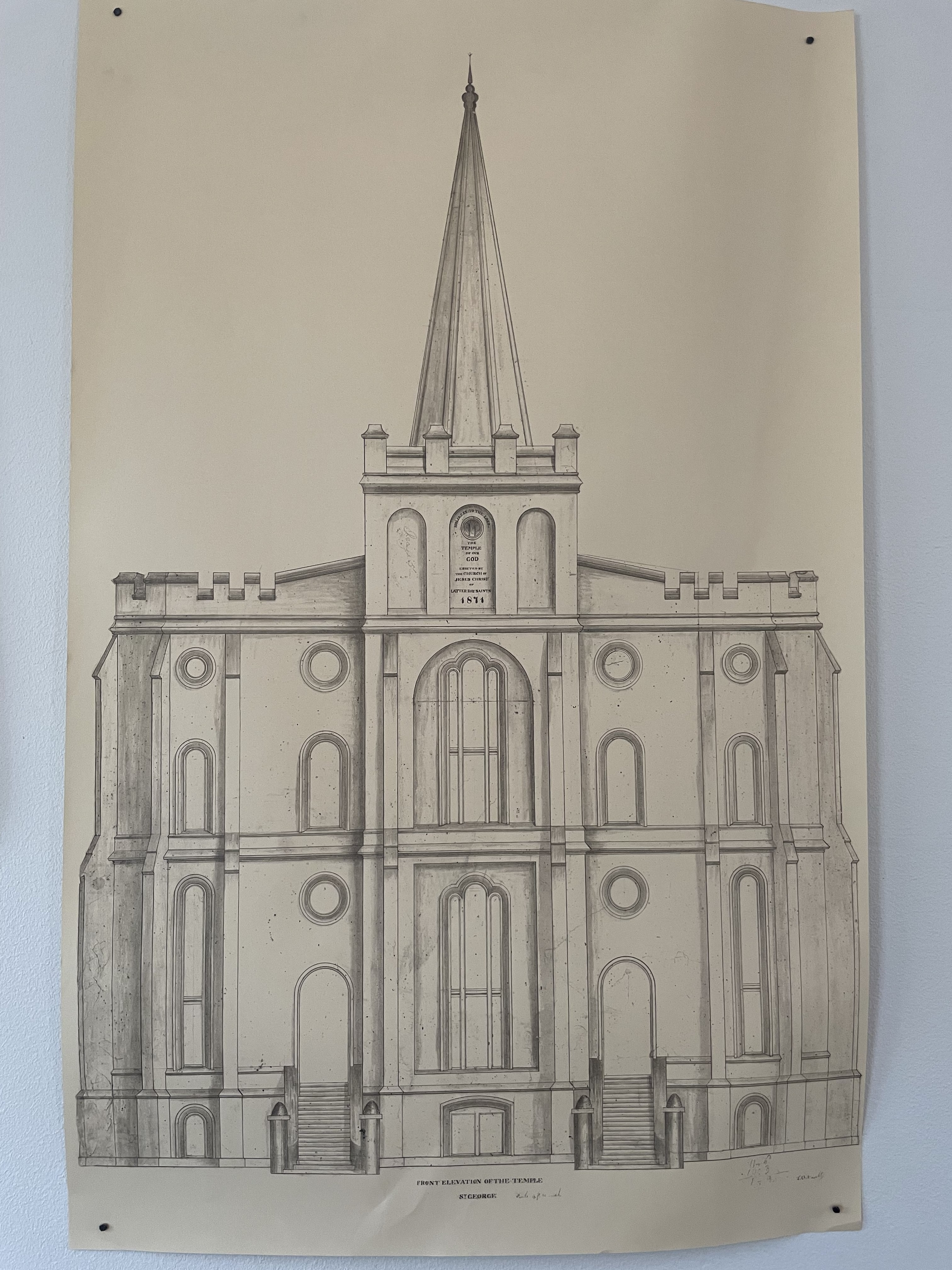
Old plan of the cupola

Young sent scouts to explore potential sites for the temple. When local leaders stated that they were unable to choose a site for the temple, Young took them on a wagon ride and selected a site southwest of St. George. Young chose a six-acre plot as the temple site, and, despite health difficulties, supervised construction from his nearby home. The chosen site of the temple had swampy conditions. Some workmen suggested relocation, but Young stated that they would build a foundation, and kept the same site. A 1942 interview with a local resident stated that Young said the location had been dedicated by ancient Nephites for a temple. However, this account surfaced nearly 70 years after Young's death and is not documented during his lifetime.

To address the conditions, workers created drains to eliminate as much water as possible before adding in stone for the foundation. Teams of oxen brought large lava rocks from a nearby quarry to the site to be crushed into gravel, creating a dry foundation. Workmen suggested using a cannon the city had acquired to crush the stone.

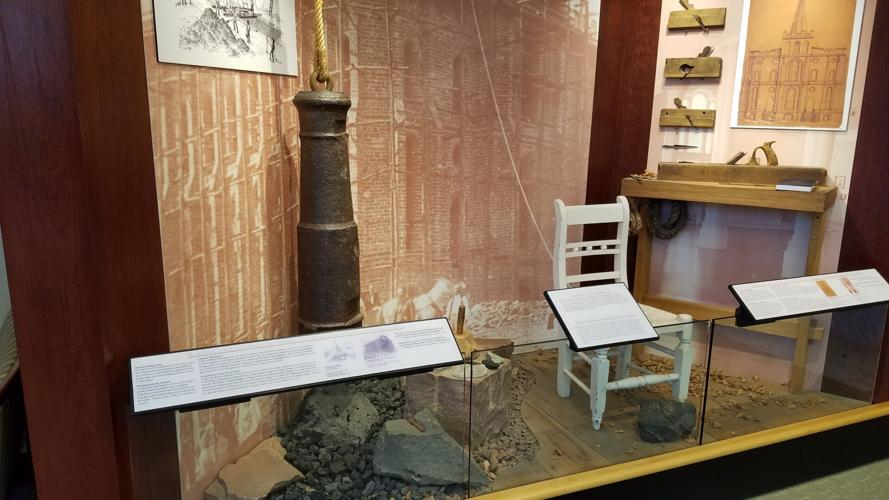
The cannon used as a pile driver

The cannon's origin has been disputed and has multiple origin stories. One states that the cannon was originally of French manufacture, and was employed by Napoleon during his siege on Moscow. The cannon was left behind during his retreat, and it traveled to Siberia, then Alaska, and eventually to California.

Kirk M. Curtis, writing for Brigham Young University, wrote that the cannon coming from Napoleon was an "interesting story". Deseret News, in 2010, quoted the Church News on the origin of the cannon in 1979 that said it came from Napoleon, and in 2020 Deseret News only mentioned that the cannon was purchased from California.

Ardis E. Parshall of the Salt Lake Tribune said that the origin of the cannon is in doubt, and stated that Erastus Snow told a local member, Jesse Crosby, to buy the cannon whilst out at California, for defense against Native-Americans. When the legislature refused to pay for it, Crosby lent it out for local militia use. The cannon ended up being too cumbersome for anything other than drills, and eventually was donated to build the temple in St. George in 1871. The Church Newsroom, in 2011 stated that Crosby did buy the cannon out in California, but that its origin was in either Mexico or South America. Other sources, like the Washington County Historical Society, and Rueben Wadsworth of St. George News state that the cannon has origins from the Mexican-American war.

Members of the Mormon Battalion acquired the cannon, mounted it on wheels, and brought it to Utah. After creating a pulley system using horsepower, workers filled the cannon with lead, encased in timbers, lifted it thirty feet in the air, and used it as a pile driver to compact the foundation. Young advised the workmen to test the foundation's strength by dropping the cannon, and that if it bounced three times, then the foundation was solid.

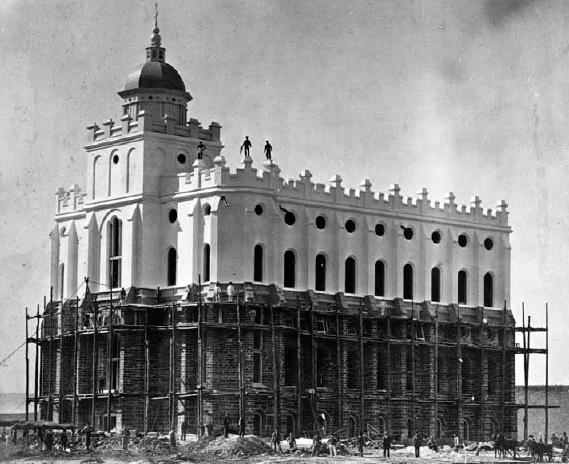
The temple under construction, the lower half of the sandstone being prepared for a whitewash coating

Following the stabilization of the foundation, construction began. The walls were built with local red sandstone, finished with a whitewash coating. Historians James Allen and Glen M. Leonard stated that the temple was a symbol of independence, self sufficiency, with "painstaking handwork" and a great labor of love by the pioneers. They also noted that it was part of a determination to follow the path set by Joseph Smith Jr, with a deep dedication to temple ordinances.

Many worked long hours in the quarry after walking five miles to the site, often for minimal pay, and still contributed half their earnings to the temple. Others donated food, clothing, and other goods to support those working full-time on the construction, and members contributed one day in ten as tithing labor.

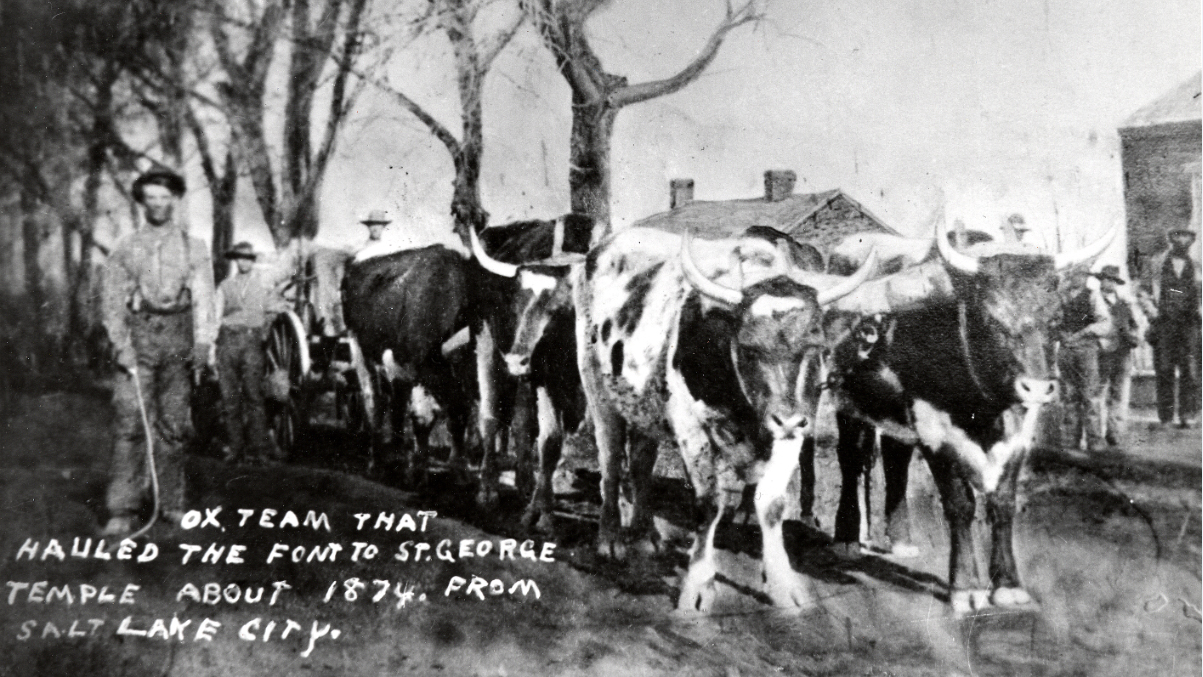
Oxen that hauled the baptismal font from Salt Lake City, 1874

Women decorated the interior with handmade carpets, along with fringe made for the altars and pulpits from Utah-produced silk. It took six years to complete construction. At its completion, it contained 1,000,000 board feet (2,000 square meters) of lumber, which had been hand-chopped and hauled 80 miles (100 km). They carved two types of volcanic rock from a nearby quarry. Average stones were about the size of a coffin, and weighed 5,500 pounds. The baptismal font of 12 oxen was paid for personally by Brigham Young at a price of $5,000, and the cast oxen were transported by train and oxen drawn wagons from Salt Lake City.

=== Opening and reconstruction ===
On January 1, 1877, a partial dedication of the temple was held, making the basement, ground floor, and sealing room available for ordinances before the structure was fully completed. The dedication was performed by Wilford Woodruff, Erastus Snow, and Brigham Young Jr..

To commemorate the finished structure, on April 6, 1877, the church's general conference was held there, during which the temple was dedicated. It was dedicated by Daniel H. Wells, Young's second counselor in the First Presidency. It is the only temple completed during Young's tenure as church president and is the oldest still actively used by the church. After the temple was dedicated, members of the church from Arizona would travel a long distance to be married in the temple; this wagon trail was traveled so often by couples that this path was called the Honeymoon Trail.

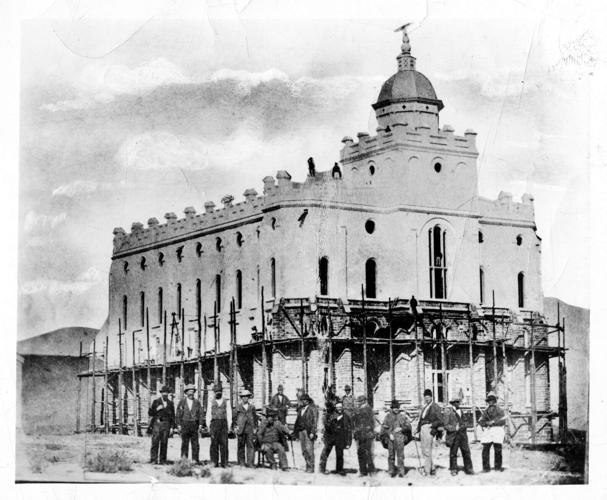
Front view of the temple with the shorter dome

Young was initially displeased with the height of the tower, he felt that it was squat. Since construction had taken so much time, historians speculate that he did not want to delay the project any longer. In 1889, two years after his death, the tower was struck by lightning, resulting in a fire that destroyed the tower and left the rest of the temple unharmed. Local legends vary in interpretation: some narratives suggest the lightning strike and subsequent fire were perceived as a means to appease Young, while others propose that he may have instigated the event. The reconstructed tower was doubled in height to reflect Young's expressed preference.

In an August 1877 account, Wilford Woodruff said the spirits of the Founding Fathers and other historical figures manifested themselves to him in the St. George Temple. They requested that the rite of the endowment be performed on their behalf, noting that it had not been done despite the Endowment House's long use. Woodruff documented these occurrences over multiple occasions spanning two days and two nights in his personal journals. Subsequently, baptisms and endowments were performed for these individuals in the temple by John D. T. McAllister, Woodruff, and other church members in the area, contributing to ordinance work for a total of 100 men and women. Some historical figures individuals mentioned in these records include George Washington, Christopher Columbus, John Wesley, Marie Antoinette, Jane Austen, and Dolley Madison.

=== Renovations and later history ===
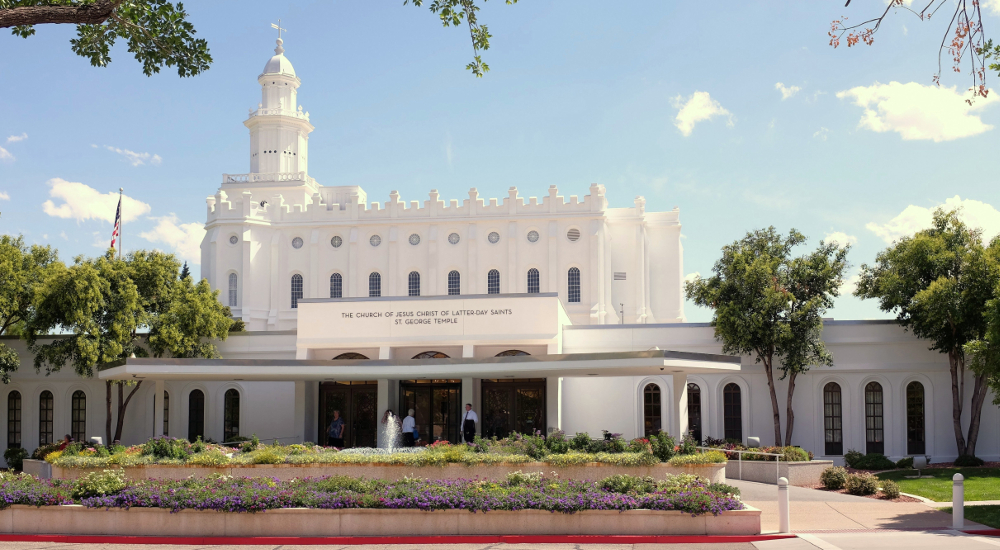
The former temple annex

Between 1917 and 2023, the temple had ten renovations, including repairs to the cupola necessitated by a lightning strike. Upgrades in 1917 included an enlargement of the annex. In 1938, significant modifications were made to the floor plan, involving the relocation of endowment rooms from the basement to the main level, the introduction of murals, and the alignment of the temple with architectural trends of the 20th century. In 1975, the annex was expanded to facilitate the transition from live actors to a film presentation of the endowment. The temple was rededicated on November 11–12, 1975, by church president Spencer W. Kimball. In 1977, the temple was added to the National Register of Historic Places.

On November 4, 2019, the temple closed for renovations. During this project, crews removed certain 20th-century additions to restore the original architectural style and incorporated seismic upgrades. Renovations included motifs such as a five-point gold star and a quatrefoil. Other additions included a skylight, a bride's exit, trees and landscaping improvements, an entrance to the baptismal font, steel trusses, murals, a new annex, and updated electrical, heating, and cooling systems. During the renovations completed in 2023, new murals were introduced for each instruction room, commissioned by three different artists. Each was designed to "capture the rugged natural beauty of the southwest Utah landscape." The temple was rededicated on December 10, 2023 by Jeffrey R. Holland, a native of St. George and the acting president of the Quorum of the Twelve Apostles. Notable temple presidents include Wilford Woodruff (1877–1884); John D. T. McAllister (1884–1893); J. Thomas Fyans (1992–1995); and Bruce C. Hafen (2010–2013).

== Design and access ==
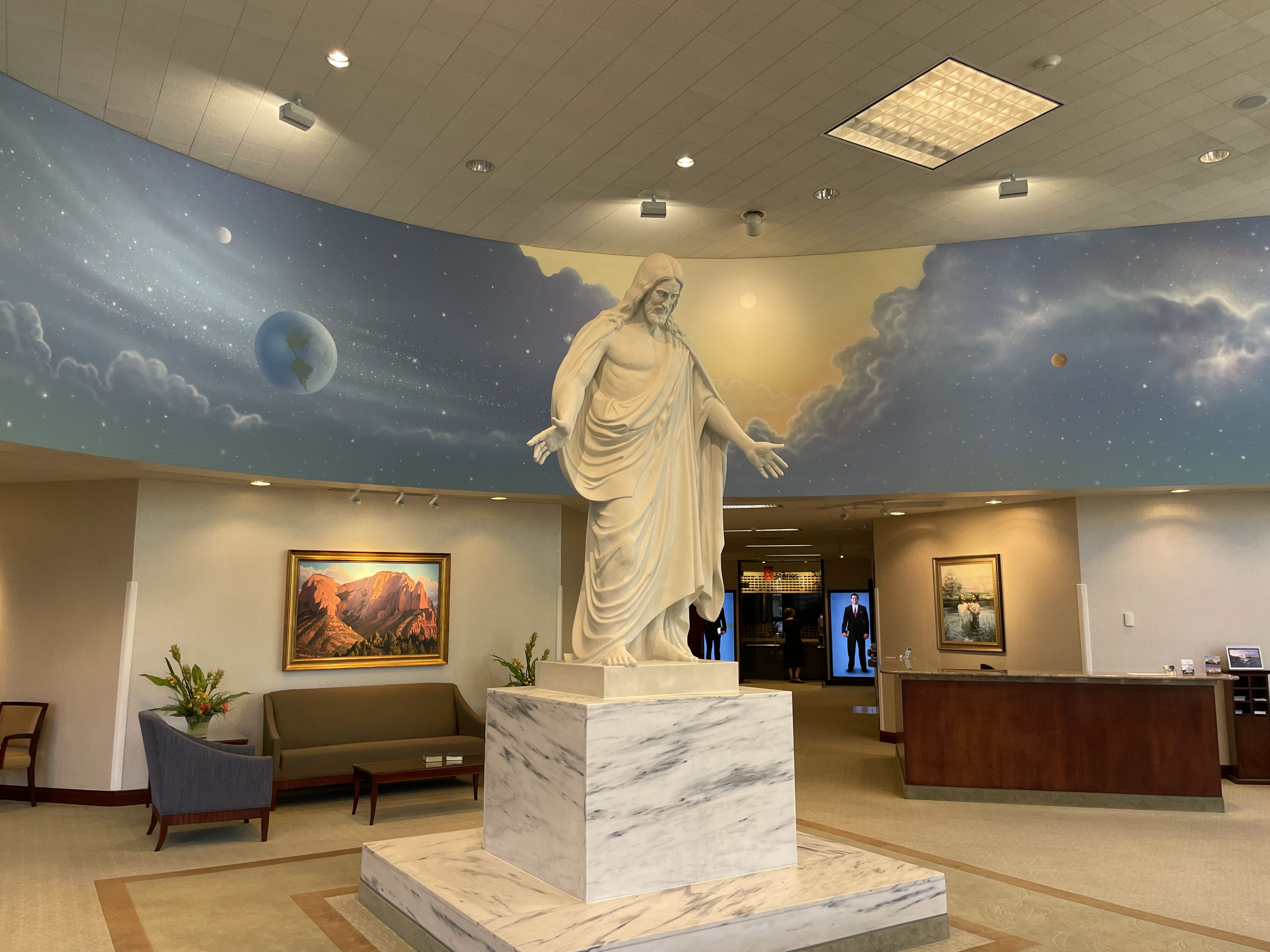
A copy of Bertel Thorvaldsen's Christus in the visitors' center

To church members, temples are regarded as sacred houses of the Lord. Once a temple has been dedicated, they are only accessible to members with a current temple recommend. The visitors' center is open to the public.

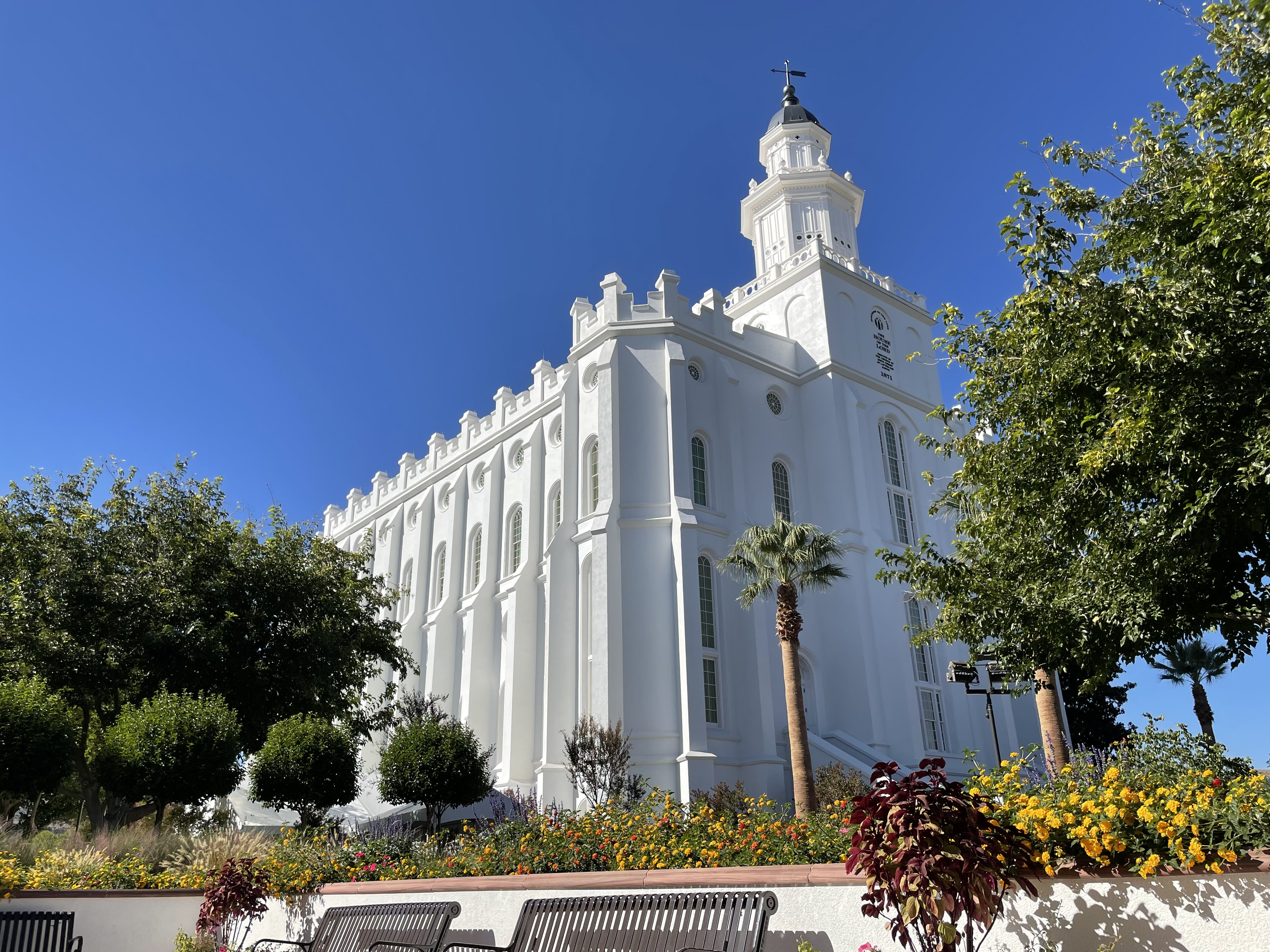
The temple seen from the southeast corner

The temple was designed by Truman O. Angell, under Brigham Young's supervision. Angell, who had worked as a carpenter on the Kirtland and Nauvoo temples, used architectural elements from both. The temple has a rectangular shape made up of two stories, an octagonal spire, and a large assembly hall. The temple is on a 6.5-acre plot (2.6 ha) with multiple pedestrian plazas, along with gardens, seating elements, and a tiered water feature.

While the St. George Temple has a similar overall layout to the Kirtland and Nauvoo temples, the exterior designs differ. The temple combines castellated (resembling fortified castles) Neo-Gothic Architecture with a French Norman Revival Style, with parapets and battlements, with hexagonal staircases inside the towers. Certain elements, like the neoclassical pilasters of Nauvoo and Kirtland, were replaced with thin buttresses, and in the space between them, Angell added a porthole motif. The St George temple is 143,969 square feet (13,400 m^{2}), and is eighty feet tall.

The temple was originally designed with two large assembly halls, like the Kirtland and Nauvoo temples. The lower Assembly Hall was divided with curtains to facilitate ordinance rooms for the endowment ceremony. Following the renovations completed in 2023, the temple's interior has a large assembly hall, a baptistry, three ordinance rooms, areas for the initiatory ordinance, and eighteen sealing rooms. A skylight completed in 2023 uses decorative art glass.

Following the renovations in 2023, the temple was updated to reflect architecture from the historical pioneer era. According to Andy Kirby, the church director of renovations for historic temple projects, said that the design for the interior "matches the historic temple and furnishings that would have been appropriate in the 1870s and 1880s." Lighting fixtures match the time period with wheel-cut glass shades with a gothic/grapevine design. The millwork is period-specific throughout the building.

== See also ==
- The Church of Jesus Christ of Latter-day Saints in Utah
- Comparison of temples of The Church of Jesus Christ of Latter-day Saints
- List of temples of The Church of Jesus Christ of Latter-day Saints
- List of temples of The Church of Jesus Christ of Latter-day Saints by geographic region
- Temple architecture (Latter-day Saints)
