= Angie F. Newman =

American church worker, lecturer, writer, editor

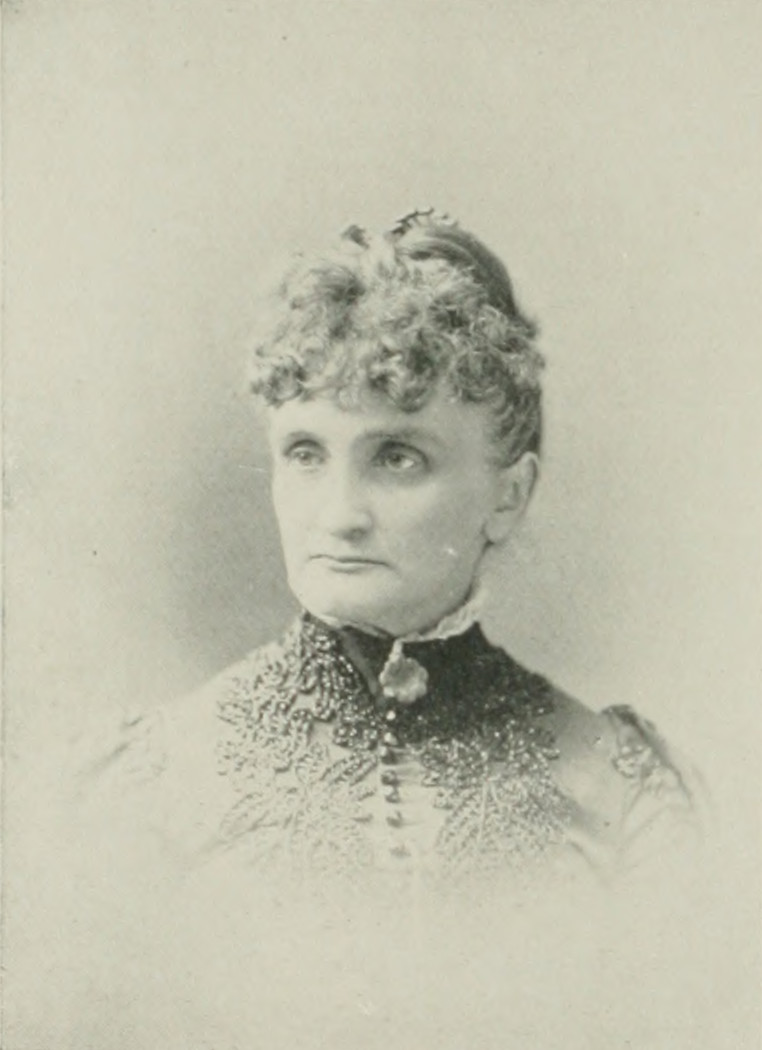
- Photo in A Woman of the Century
- Born: Angelia Louise French Thurston; December 4, 1837; Montpelier, Vermont, U.S.
- Died: April 15, 1910 (aged 72); Lincoln, Nebraska, U.S.
- Resting place: Wyuka Cemetery, Lincoln, Nebraska, U.S.
- Other name: Angie
- Education: Lawrence University
- Occupation: Social reform activist
- Organizations: Woman's Christian Temperance Union; Methodist Episcopal Church; Daughters of the American Revolution
- Spouses: Frank Kilgore (m. 1856; died 1856) David Newman (m. 1859; died 1893)

Angie F. Newman (née Thurston; after first marriage, Kilgore; after second marriage, Newman; December 4, 1837 – April 15, 1910) was an American social reform activist who worked as a lecturer, temperance leader, and writer during the long nineteenth century. She served as Superintendent of Jails and Prisons, and also of Flower Mission work for the Woman's Christian Temperance Union (WCTU); and as Vice-president General of the Daughters of the American Revolution. She was an acting member of the National Council of Women and the Woman's Relief Corps. Newman was the first woman delegate ever elected to the Quadrennial General Conference of the Methodist Episcopal Church (MEC). She was appointed Western Secretary of the Woman's Foreign Missionary Society of the MEC and also worked for the MEC's National Home Missionary Society.

== Early life and education ==
Angelia Louise French Thurston, nicknamed "Angie", was born in Montpelier, Vermont on December 4, 1837 to Daniel Sylvester and Matilda (Benjamin) Thurston. When she was ten years old, her mother died, and when she was fifteen, she removed with her father to Madison, Wisconsin. She was educated in the academy in Montpelier, and afterwards in Lawrence University, in Appleton, Wisconsin.

== Career ==
She taught in Montpelier at the age of 14 or 15 years, and later in Madison. For much of the time between 1862 and 1875, she was an invalid, afflicted with pulmonary weakness. In August 1871, she moved to Lincoln, Nebraska, where she came to believe that her health was restored in answer to prayer.

Her interest in missions, home and foreign, led to her appointment as Western Secretary of the Woman's Foreign Missionary Society of the MEC, a position she held from December 1871, until May 1879. In this interest, she traveled and lectured in every section of the U.S. During the same period, she also served on the editorial staff of The Heathen Woman's Friend, a missionary periodical published in Boston, Massachusetts.

Visiting Utah during a period of ill health, she investigated the situation of Mormon women. In 1883, at the request of Bishop Isaac William Wiley, of the MEC, she went to Cincinnati, Ohio, and presented the Mormon issue to the National Home Missionary Society. A Mormon bureau was created to push home missionary work in Utah, of which she was made secretary. She acted as chair of a committee appointed to consider the plan of founding a home for Mormon women, who wish to escape from polygamy, to be sustained by the society. She returned home to proceed to Utah in behalf of the society, but in a public meeting called in Lincoln, she fell from a platform and was seriously injured, which thwarted her plans.

During the interval, the Utah gentiles formed a "Home" association, and on her recovery, Newman went as an un-salaried philanthropist to Washington to represent the interests of the Utah gentiles in the Forty-ninth, Fiftieth, and Fifty-first Congresses. She prepared three elaborate arguments on the Mormon problem, one of which she delivered before the Congressional committees. The other two were introduced by Senator George F. Edmunds to the United States Senate, and thousands of copies of each of those three papers were ordered printed by the Senate for Congressional use. She secured appropriations of US$80,000 for the association and the building of the home. The Industrial Christian Home for Polygamous Wives in Salt Lake City, filled with polygamous women and children, attested the value of her work.

In Nebraska, Newman participated in the WCTU's flower mission work for 12 years, For 27 years, she served as superintendent of Prison and Jail work in the National WCTU. In 1886, a department of Mormon work was created by the National WCTU, and she was elected its superintendent. In 1889, she became a member of the lecture bureau of the National WCTU. In the cities of every northern and several of the southern States, she spoke from pulpit and platform on temperance, Mormonism, and the social purity movement.

Newman was connected officially with various other benevolent and charitable organizations, and was active in them all despite the fact that, as the result of several serious accidents, she was scarcely ever free from pain and weakness. From 1883 to 1892, she was annually commissioned by the successive governors of the State as delegate to the National Conference of Charities and Correction.

In 1888, she was elected a delegate to the Quadrennial General Conference of the MEC, which held its session in New York City, the first woman ever elected to a seat in that body. In January 1890, on the way to Salt Lake City, she met with an accident which endangered her life for two and half years, and from which she slowly convalesced. For a long time, Newman was a contributor to religious and secular journals. In 1878, her "Heathen at Home," a monograph, was published and had large sale. "Iphigenia," another work, was published thereafter.

Newman was an extensive traveler, and after a year in Europe, Egypt and Palestine, 1896–1897, with her daughter, she gave a series of lectures on themes associated with the tour. She also wrote a book on the novel experience of "the McKinley Button", which she and her daughter wore on the entire trip, under the title of McKinley Carnations of Memory. She also wrote: An Italian Winter, and The Sacrifice of Iphigenia, having studied her themes in Italy and Greece. Newman engaged several years in preparation of her book, The Tragedy of Christianity or the Vital Issues of Mormon Propagandism.

During the Spanish–American War (1898), Newman was commissioned hospital inspector for Hawaii and the Philippines. She was stationed in San Francisco for eight months while executing this important commission.

== Personal life ==
In 1856, she married Frank Kilgore, of Madison, who was a brother-in-law of Bishop Henry White Warren. He died a few months after their marriage.

In 1859, she married David Newman, a dry goods merchant of Beaver Dam, Wisconsin, and, on August 5, 1859, moved there. The couple had two children: a son and a daughter. David Newman died in a railroad accident in 1893.

Angie Newman died April 15, 1910, aged 72, in Lincoln, Nebraska, and is buried at Wyuka Cemetery, in Lincoln.

== See also ==
- Mary Clarke Nind
- Frances Willard
