= Truman O. Angell =

American architect (1810–1887)

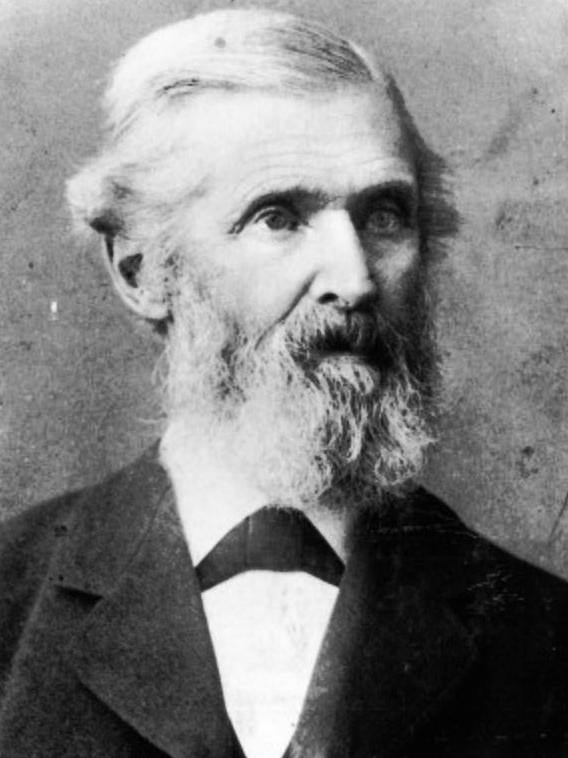

Personal details
- Born: Truman Osborn Angell; June 5, 1810; Providence, Rhode Island, U.S.
- Died: October 16, 1887 (aged 77); Salt Lake City, Utah, U.S.
- Resting place: Salt Lake City Cemetery; 40°46′37.92″N 111°51′28.8″W
- Spouse(s): Polly Johnson; Mary A. Johnson
- Children: 8
- Relatives: Mary Ann Angell (sister)
- Signature

Truman Osborn Angell (/ˈeɪndʒəl/ "angel"; June 5, 1810 – October 16, 1887) was an American architect who served many years as the official architect of The Church of Jesus Christ of Latter-day Saints (LDS Church). The brother-in-law of Brigham Young, he was a member of the vanguard company of Mormon pioneers that entered the Salt Lake Valley on July 24, 1847. He designed the Salt Lake Temple, the Lion House, the Beehive House, the Utah Territorial Statehouse, the St. George Utah Temple, and other public buildings. Angell's modifications to the Salt Lake Tabernacle are credited with perfecting the acoustics for which the building is famous.

== Early life ==
Angell was born on June 5, 1810, in Providence, Rhode Island, the third son of seven children born to James W. Angell and Phebe Morton. Between the ages of 17 and 19, Angell learned the carpenter and joiner's trade from a man in the neighborhood of his family home. However, due to problems that his mother had with his father, at age 21 he moved with his mother to China, New York (near her family), where he met and married Polly Johnson.

Truman's sister Mary Ann Angell married Brigham Young.

== Early work in the Church ==
At age 23, Angell joined The Church of Jesus Christ of Latter-day Saints along with his mother and his wife, and the following spring he served a mission for the church for nine weeks, traveling 500 miles. His mission companion was his cousin Joseph Holbrook (their mothers were sisters).

The following July, he and his wife settled in Lima, New York. In the fall of 1835, they moved to Kirtland, Ohio, and Angell helped build the Kirtland Temple. He was soon ordained a member of the Second Quorum of Seventies and the following spring commenced making arrangements to go on a mission.

With a day or two of work left, Joseph Smith approached him at work and asked him to build a store. Angell answered, "that in consequence of being a seventy I was about to go out into the vineyard to preach". "Well," Smith said, "Go ahead," and Angell continued his work. In Angell's words he says:

The next day I looked up and saw the First Presidency of the Church together, distant about forty rods. I dropped my head and continued my work. At this time a voice seemed to whisper to me, "It is your duty to build that house for President Smith," and while I was meditating, I looked up and Brother Joseph Smith, Jr., was close to me. He said, "It is your duty to build that house." I answered, "I know it." Accordingly I changed my determination and yielded obedience. The numerous and continued calls to do this and that job soon plunged me in business so deep that I asked Brother Joseph if it was my calling to work at home. He said, "I'll give you work enough for twenty men."

During the dedication of the Kirtland Temple, Angell recorded the following in his journal:

When about midway during the prayer, there was a glorious sensation passed through the house [Kirtland Temple]; and we, having our heads bowed in prayer, felt a sensation very elevating to the soul. At the close of the prayer, F. G. Williams being in the upper east stand—Joseph being in the speaking stand next below—rose and testified that midway during the prayer an holy angel came and seated himself in the stand. When the afternoon meeting assembled, Joseph, feeling very much elated, arose the first thing and said the personage who had appeared in the morning was the Angel Peter come to accept the dedication."

Angell moved with the Latter Day Saints to Far West, Missouri, and then to Nauvoo, Illinois.

== Nauvoo Temple ==
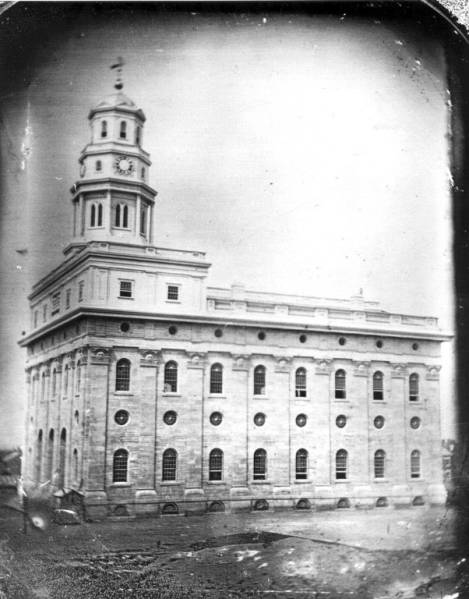
The completed first Nauvoo Temple

Angell later went on to work on the Nauvoo Temple, having been appointed superintendent of joiner work under church architect William Weeks, carrying out the architect's designs in the construction of that temple.

On the construction of the Nauvoo Temple, Angell served as the superintendent of the joiners.

== Work in the West ==
After the dedication of the Nauvoo Temple, Angell moved to Iowa and then went further west. He left his wife behind in Winter Quarters and went on with Brigham Young's pioneering company, entering the Salt Lake Valley in July 1847. Angell then returned to Winter Quarters in the fall of 1847. Three of his children died and were buried in Winter Quarters, and he moved to the Salt Lake Valley with his sick wife and his remaining two children.

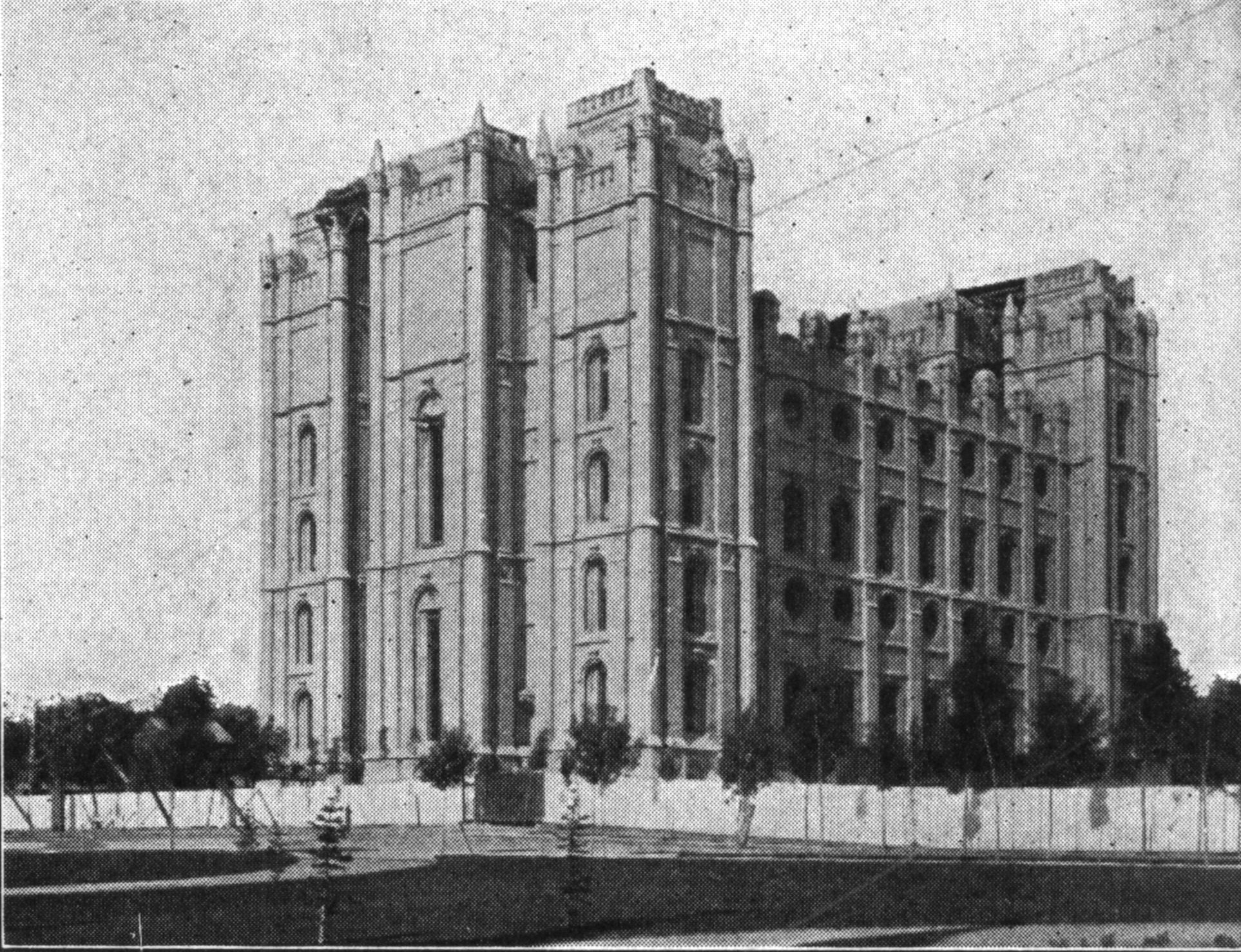
Salt Lake Temple in 1892

Angell was appointed Church Architect by Brigham Young on January 26, 1850. In this position, he was in charge of the construction of numerous buildings in Utah Territory, including the St. George Temple, and the Salt Lake Temple. Angell's modifications to the Salt Lake Tabernacle in 1870 are said to have resolved the outstanding acoustical issues with that structure. In 1851, Angell polygamously married Susan Eliza Savage, who had been a textile worker in the Lowell, Massachusetts, cotton mills in the early 1840s until she migrated to Salt Lake City after joining the Church. In 1855 he married a third time to Mary Ann Johnson.

Angell was originally asked to also be in charge of the design and construction of the Manti and Logan Temples, but in consequence of their being about 100 miles distant from him in different directions, they were placed in the care of his two assistants. Truman O. Angell Jr., supervised the construction of the Logan Temple and William H. Folsom was responsible for the Manti Temple, while Angell stayed and worked on the Salt Lake Temple. After his son completed the Logan Temple, he assisted his father with work on the Salt Lake Temple.

In April 1856, Young asked Angell to leave his family and go to Europe so that he could learn the architectural designs there. After he returned from his mission to Europe, Angell continued to labor on the Salt Lake Temple. From 1861 to 1867, Angell had stepped down as Church Architect due to poor health and was replaced by William Folsom. However, in April 1867, Angell was again sustained by church members as church architect. Even during the time that he was not church architect, Angell worked closely with the construction of the Salt Lake Temple. He continued to serve as Church Architect until his death on October 16, 1887, at the age of 77. For more than 35 years he had worked on the Salt Lake Temple. It was said that he knew every stone in its walls. Of Angell, Wendell Ashton wrote: "As long as the Salt Lake Temple stands, there will be a magnificent monument to the patience, skill and dedication of its architect." Although Angell did not live to see the temple completed, he was a key mover behind its being built. Angell was buried in Salt Lake City Cemetery.

A number of Angell's works are listed on the National Register of Historic Places.

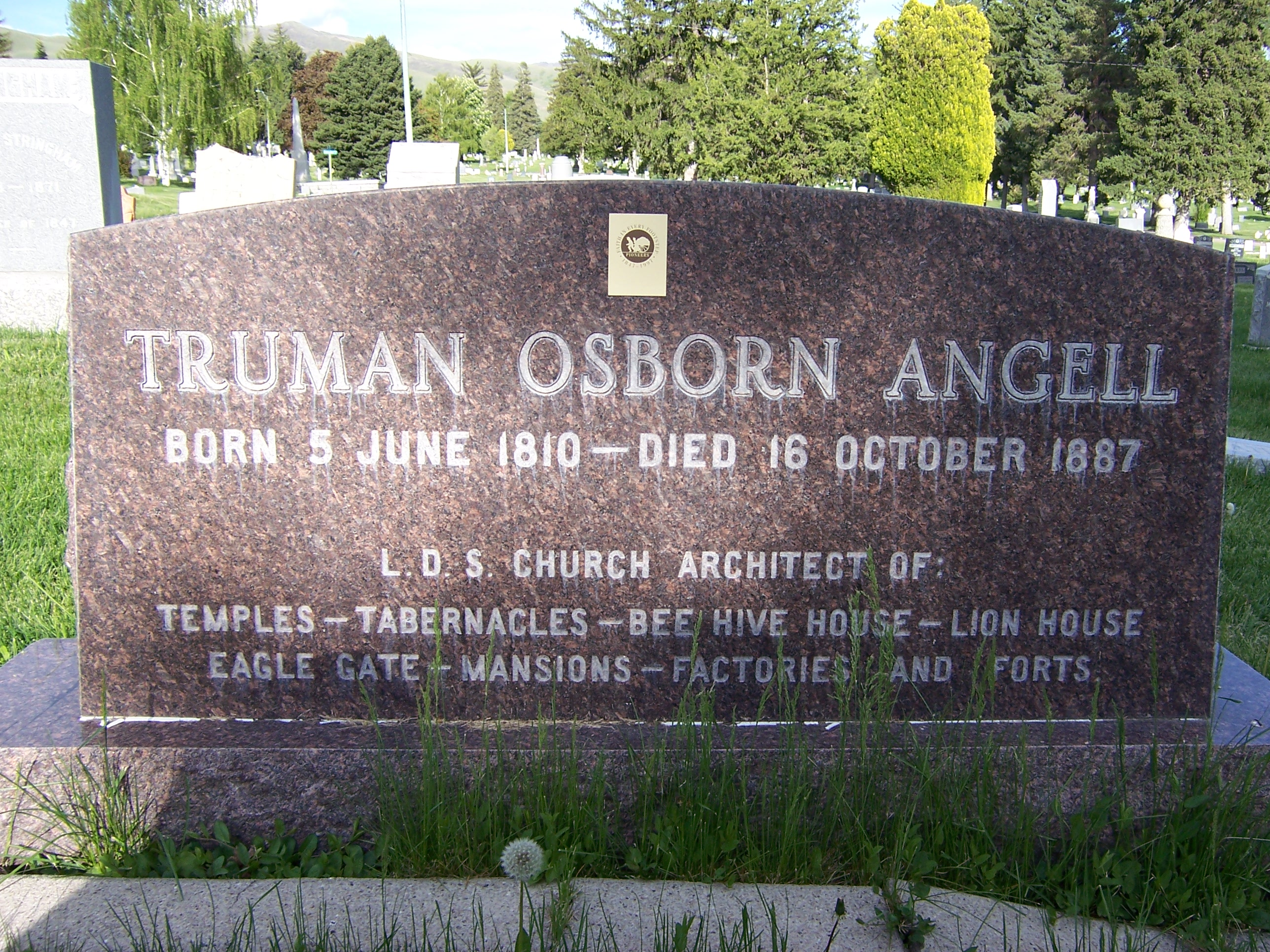
Grave marker of Truman O. Angell.

== List of works ==
Works include (with variations in attribution):

- Bear Lake County Courthouse, U.S. 89, Paris, Idaho (Angell, T.O.), NRHP-listed
- Beehive House, 67 E. South Temple St., Salt Lake City, Utah (Angell, Truman O.), NRHP-listed
- Social Hall, 41 S. State Street, Salt Lake City, Utah
- Logan Temple, Between 2nd and 3rd East and 1st and 2nd North, Logan, Utah (Angell, Truman O.), NRHP-listed
- St. George Temple, Bounded by 200 East, 300 East, 400 South, and 500 South, St. George, Utah (Angell, Truman O.), NRHP-listed
- Utah Territorial Capitol, Center St. between Main and 100 West St., Fillmore, Utah (Angell, Truman O.), NRHP-listed
- John M. Whitaker House, 975 Garfield Ave., Salt Lake City, Utah (Angell, Truman O. Jr.), NRHP-listed
- Brigham Young Complex, 63-67 E. South Temple St., Salt Lake City, Utah (Angell, Truman O.), NRHP-listed

== Images of works ==
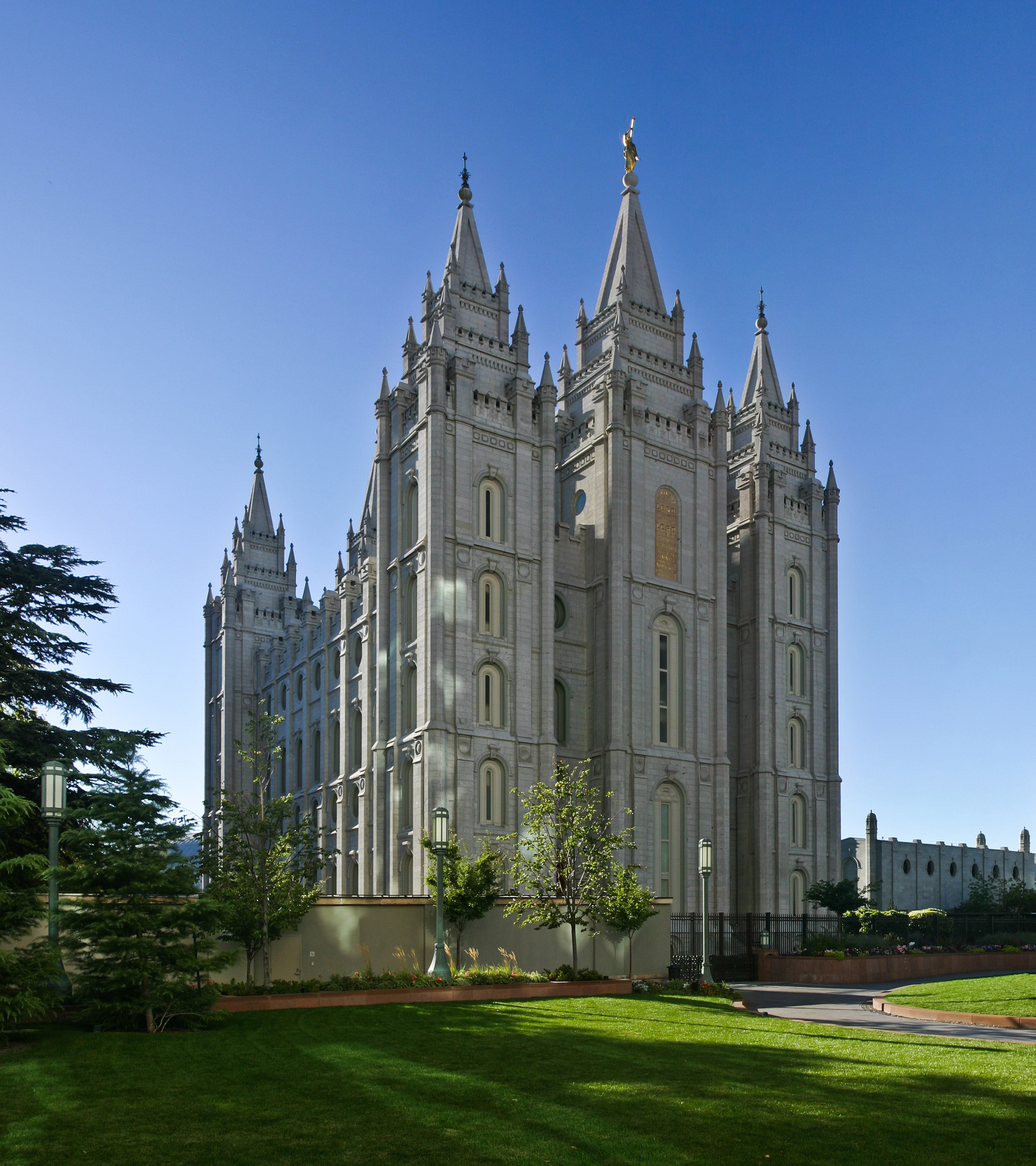
Salt Lake Temple

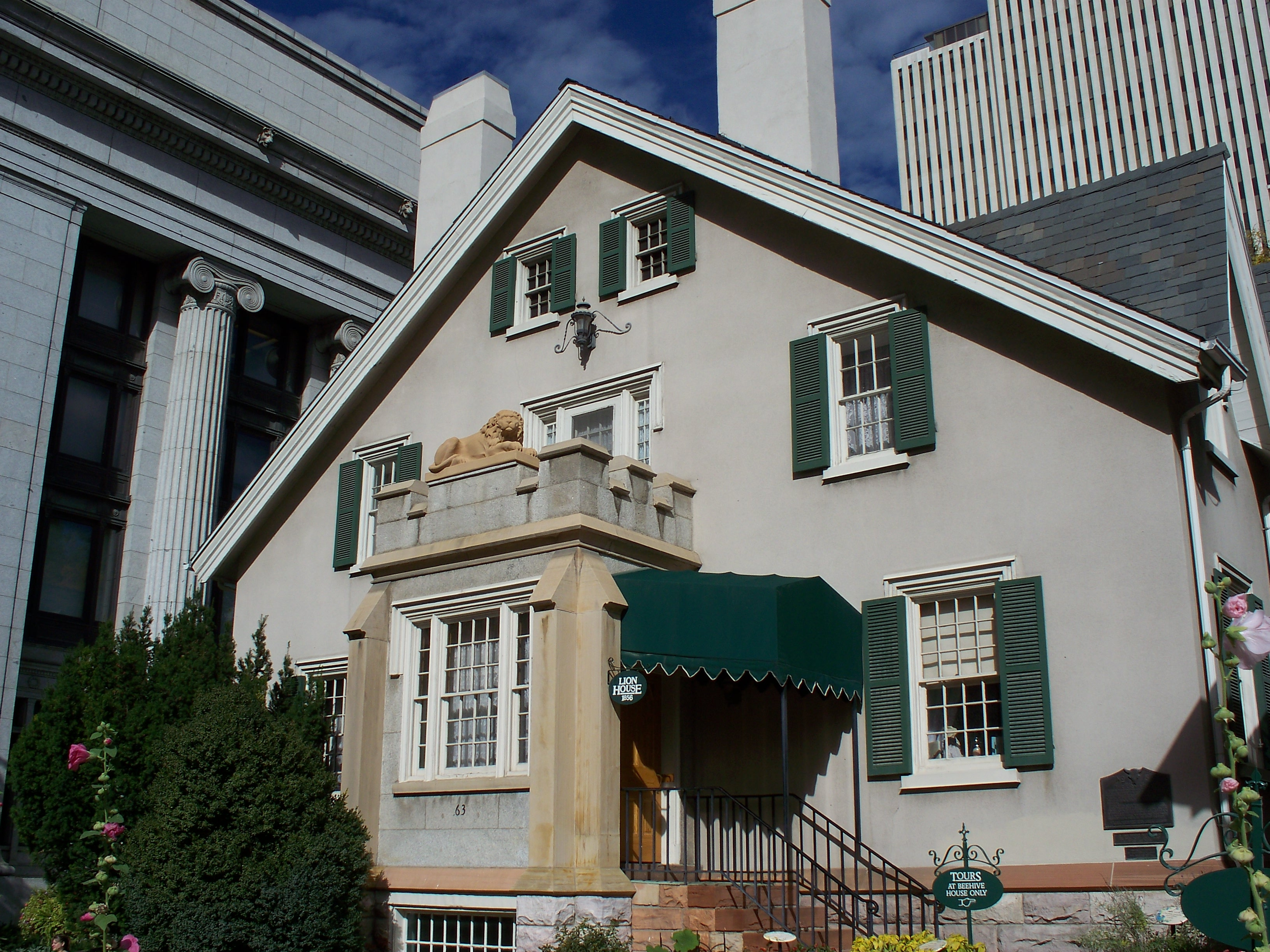
Lion House

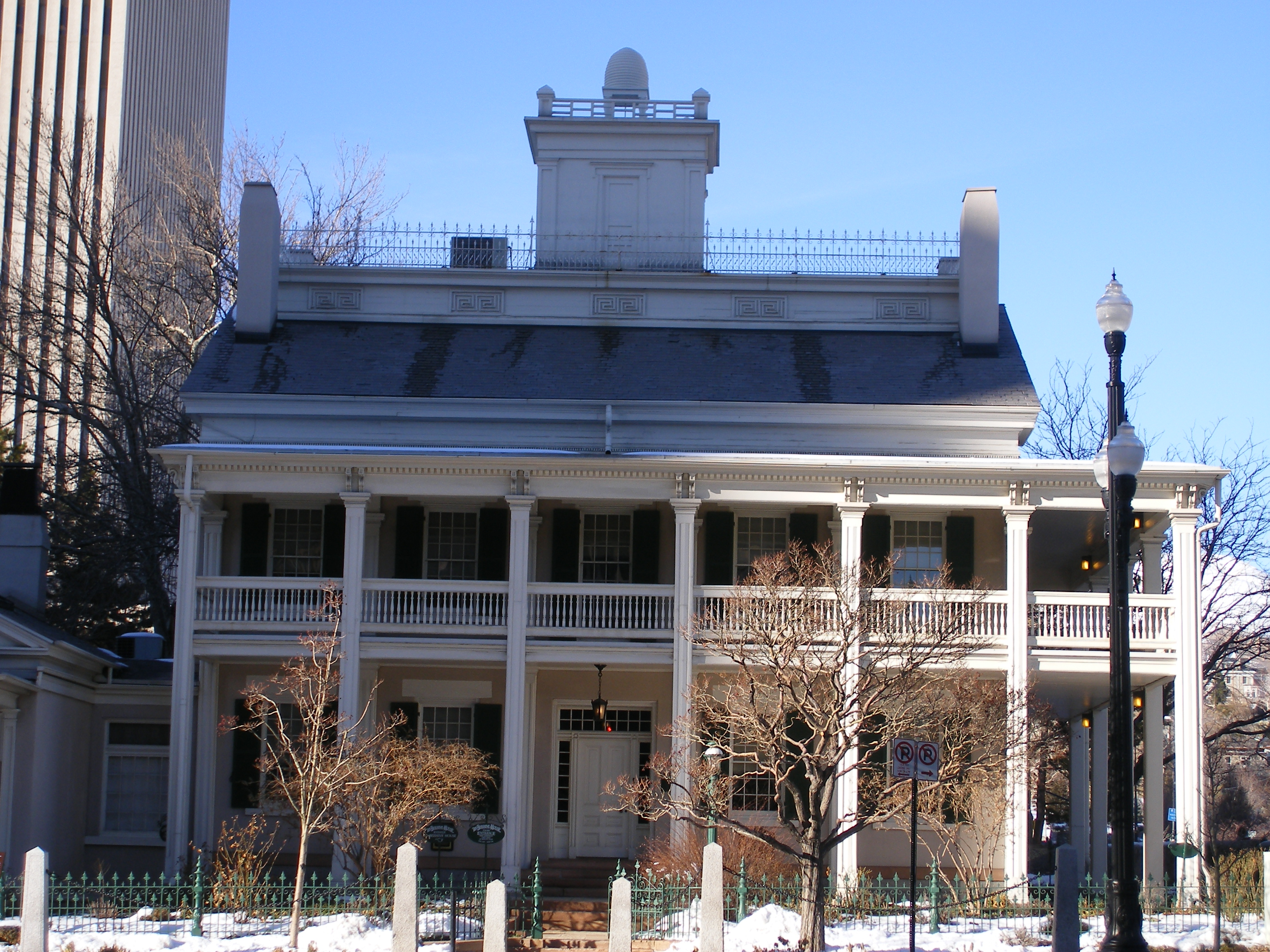
Beehive House

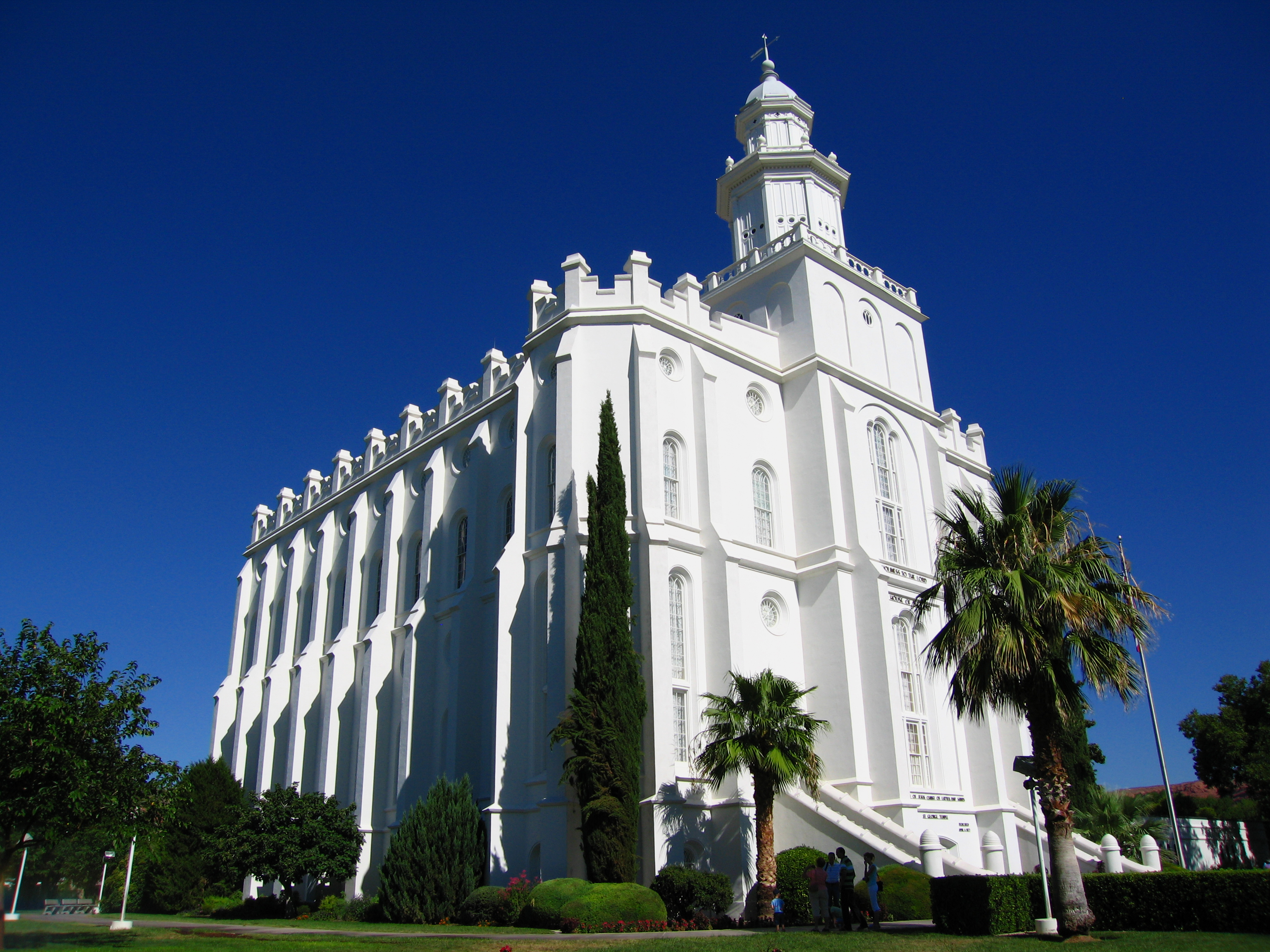
St. George Temple

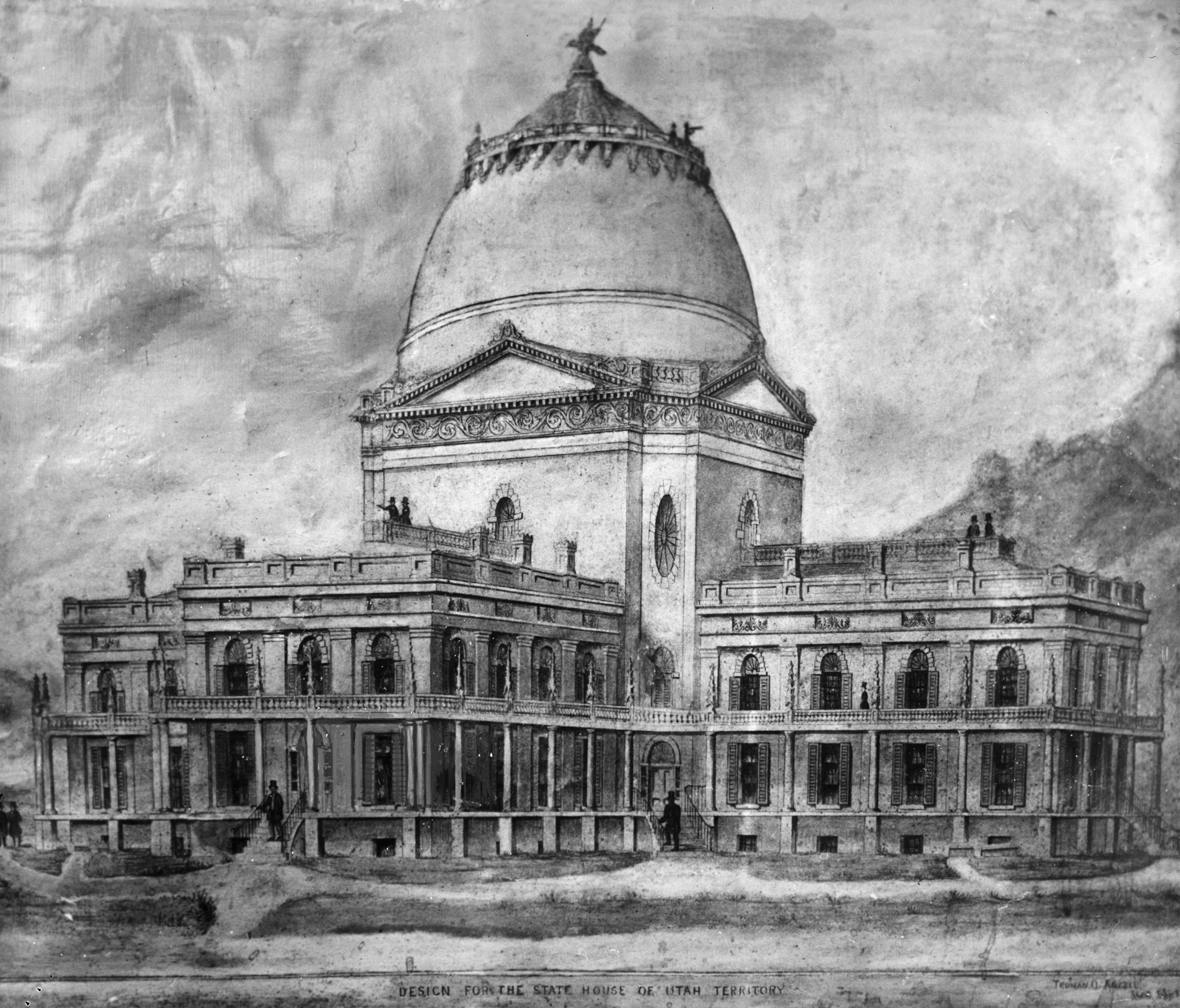
Utah Territorial Statehouse

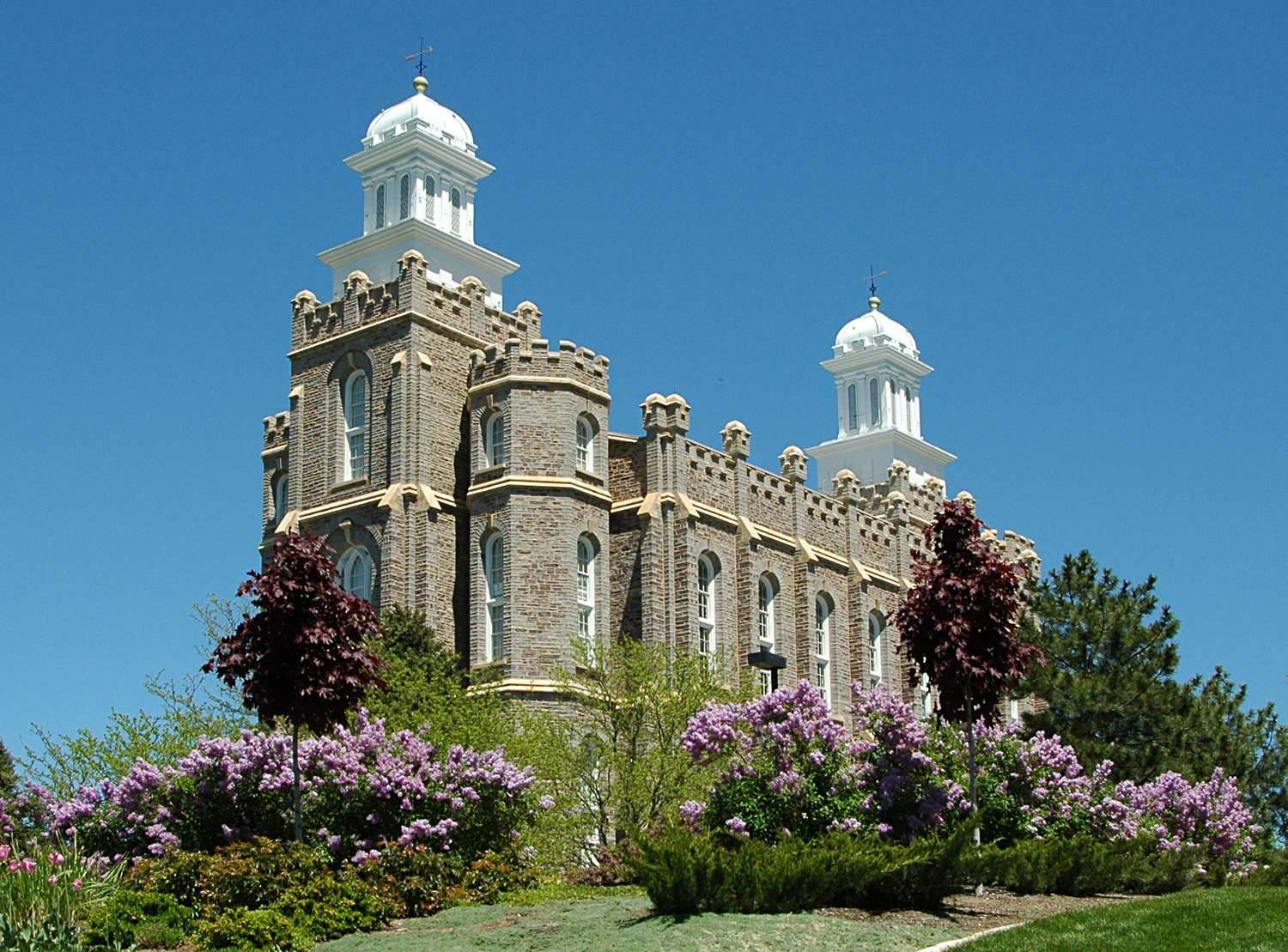
Logan Utah Temple

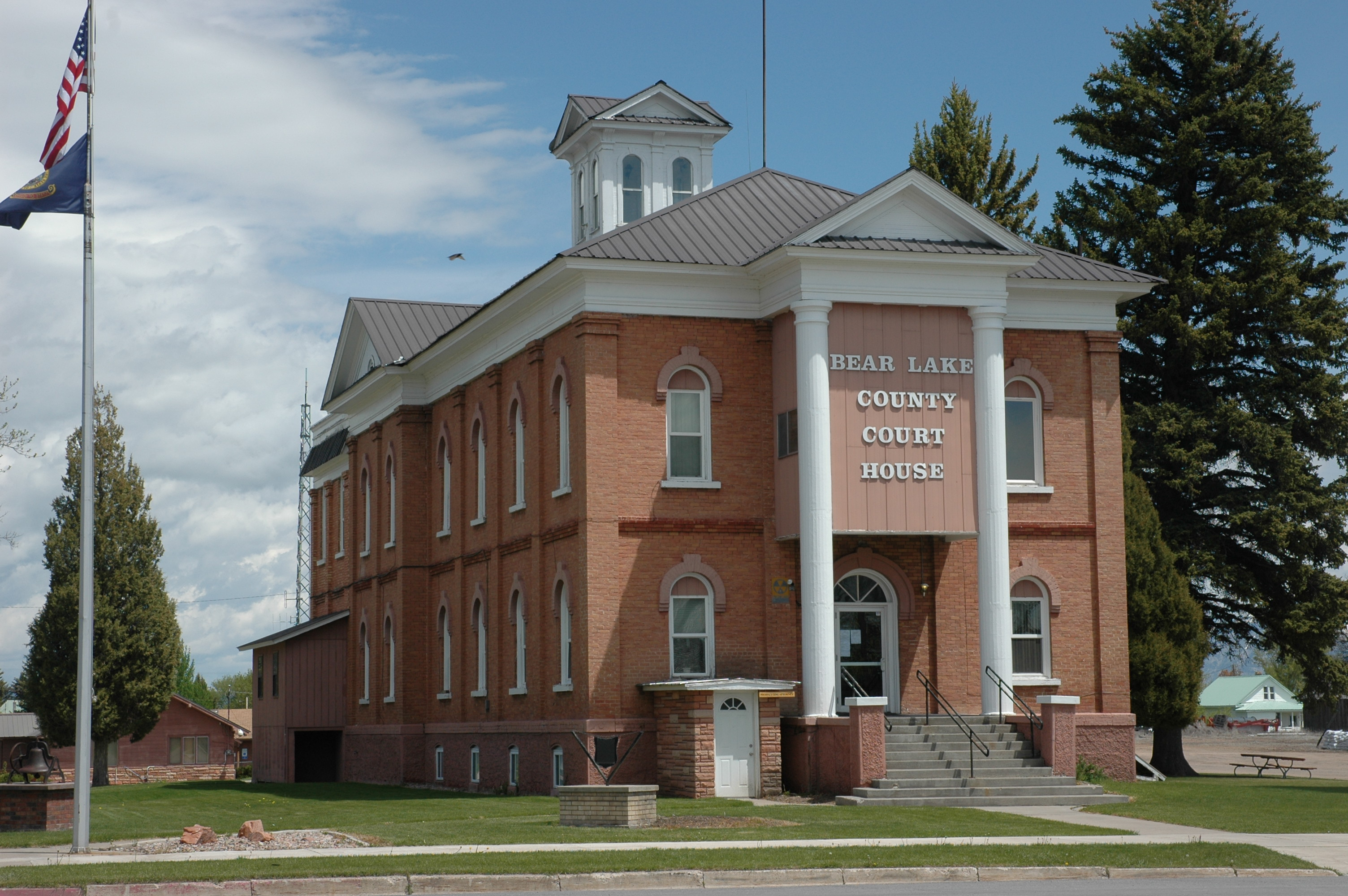
Bear Lake County Courthouse

== See also ==
- Temple architecture (Latter-day Saints)
