= Utah Territorial Statehouse =

- Utah Territorial Capitol
- U.S. National Register of Historic Places
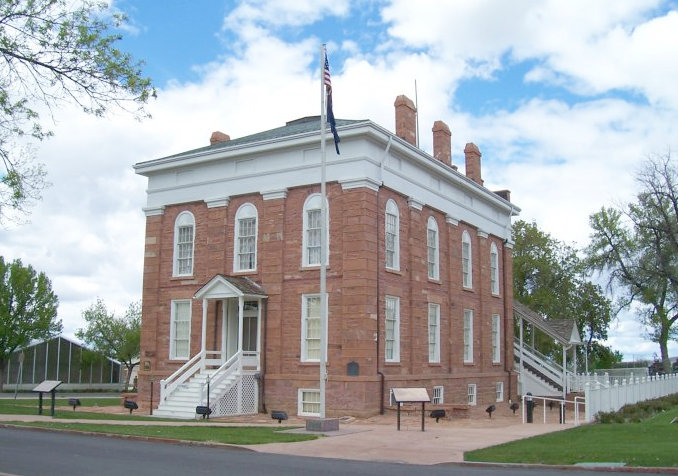

- Location within Utah
- Location: Fillmore, Utah; United States
- Coordinates: 38.968297°N 112.325771°W
- Built: 1852–55
- Architect: Truman O. Angell
- Visitation: 6,615 (2022)
- Website: Official website
- NRHP reference No.: 70000625
- Added to NRHP: September 22, 1970

The Utah Territorial Statehouse, officially Territorial Statehouse State Park Museum, is a state park in Fillmore, Utah. The museum and park preserves the original seat of government for Utah Territory before the capital was moved to Salt Lake City in 1856. Built from 1852 to 1855, the statehouse was initially intended as a larger structure, but only the south wing was completed before the project was abandoned due to lack of federal funding. After its construction, the Utah Territorial Legislative Assembly met in the building for only one full session and parts of two others.

== History ==
In 1851, Mormon leader Brigham Young and a group of lawmakers determined that Fillmore should become the capital of the provisional State of Deseret because of its central location. When the Congress of the United States turned down their petition for statehood and created the Utah Territory instead, Fillmore was designated as its territorial capital.

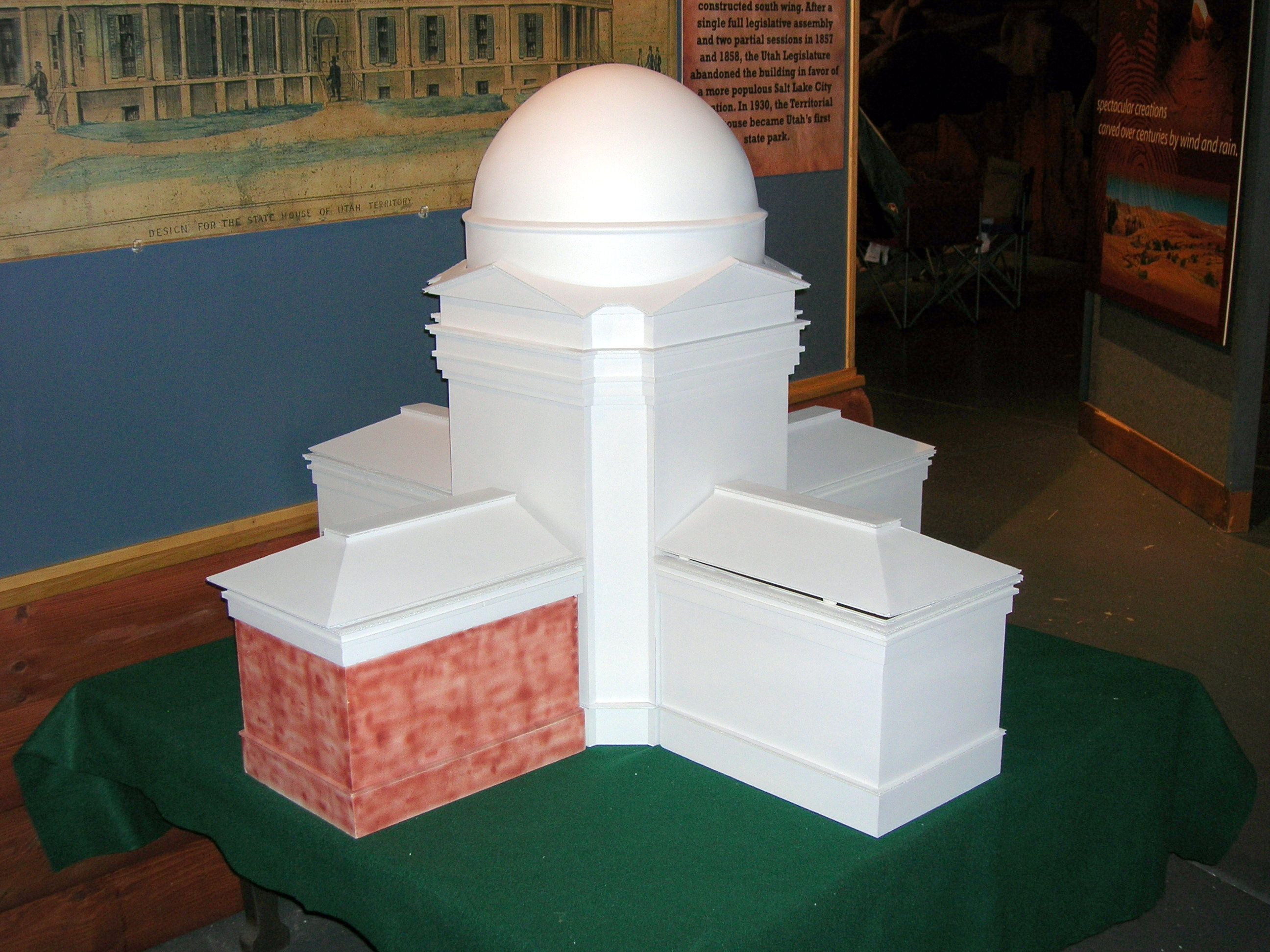
A model of the Utah Territorial Statehouse as originally conceived by architect Truman O. Angell. The red area represents the portion of the building that was actually completed.

The original statehouse building plans called for four wings connected by a Moorish dome at the center, but only the south wing was completed. U.S. President Millard Fillmore had helped secure the first $20,000 for construction, but could not help the territory secure additional funding after he lost the next election. (Both Fillmore and the county in which it sits, Millard County, were named in honor of President Fillmore.) In 1856, after housing its first and only full session, the Territorial Statehouse was abandoned by the territorial Legislative Assembly in favor of a return to Utah's largest city, Salt Lake City.

By the early 20th century, the building was vacant, decaying and threatened with demolition. During the 1920s, the Daughters of the Utah Pioneers (DUP) proposed restoring the statehouse to serve as a history museum. Under the direction of the Utah State Park and Recreation Commission, the museum opened in 1930 and was placed in the custodial care of the DUP. The statehouse and grounds became a state park in 1957. Today, the Territorial Statehouse serves as a museum which contains many artifacts from the 19th and early 20th centuries. Two restored cabins and a pioneer stone schoolhouse are also located on the grounds.

Utah's governor, Jon Huntsman, Jr. delivered his State of the State address from the Territorial Statehouse in 2005 while the State Capitol was undergoing renovations. The State of the State address in 2005 was the first official use of the Territorial Statehouse for a Utah Governmental Function since 1856.

== The exterior ==
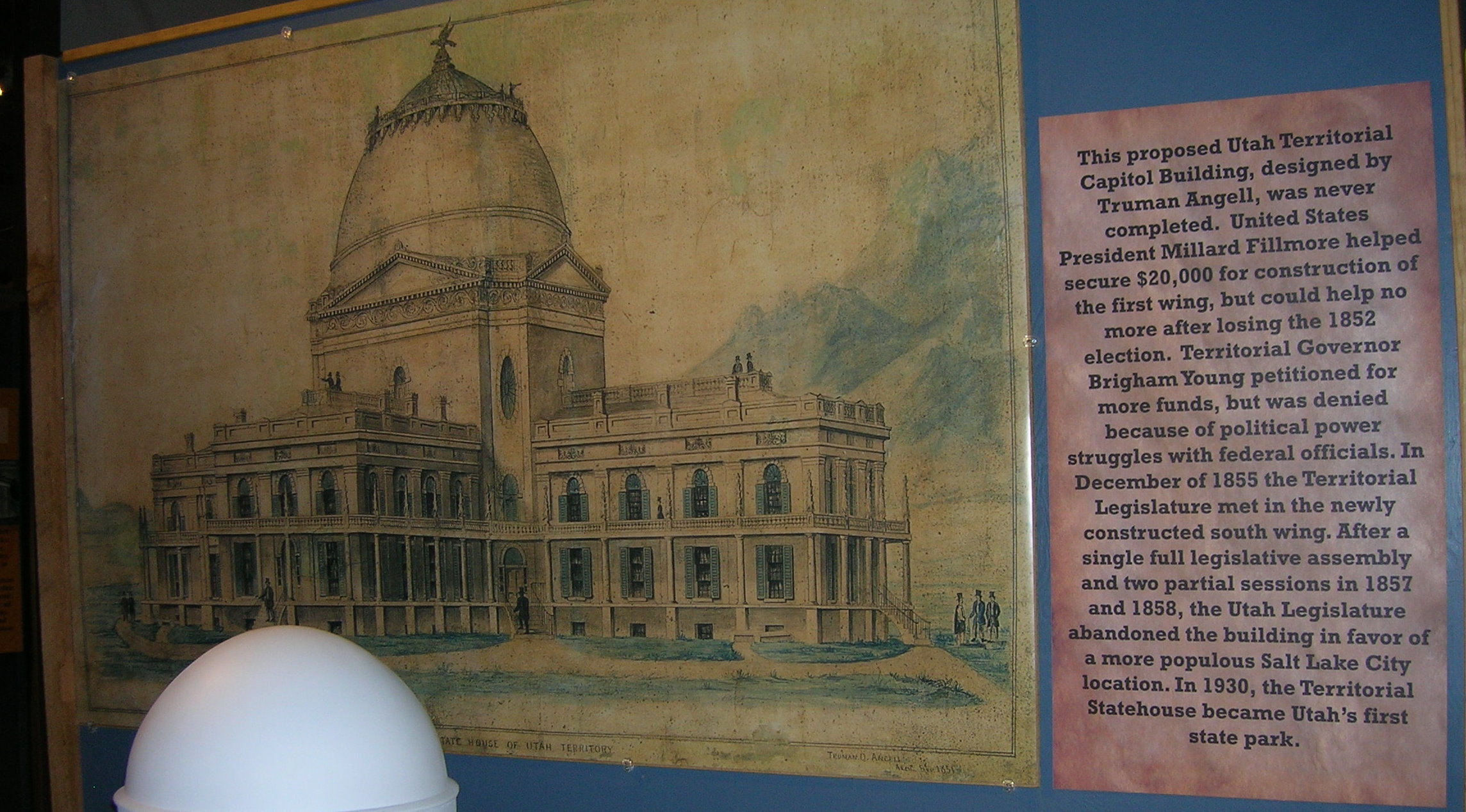
An architectural drawing by Truman O. Angell of the original design for the Utah Territorial Statehouse.

Because they expected the red stone exterior to be covered with stucco, the stoneworkers who constructed the statehouse carved their initials into several of the stones on the outside of the building. Those initials are still visible today. The south exterior wall bears a plaque from the National Register of Historic Places. According to the plaque, the building was used by the 5th, 6th and 8th Legislatures who served in 1855, 1856, and 1858 respectively. There is also a plaque from the Daughters of Utah Pioneers dated August 3, 1935 that reads:

Creating Fillmore City and Millard County the territorial legislature of Utah selected Pahvant Valley as capitol site Oct. 29, 1851. This spot was selected by Governor Brigham Young. Construction work began in 1852. Truman O. Angell, architect and Anson Call, supervisor. This south wing was used by the Fifth Territorial Legislature Oct. 10, 1855. In 1856 the seat of government was moved to Salt Lake City. Later used as court house and county headquarters. Restored in 1928 and dedicated as state museum July 24, 1930. Custodians; Daughters of Utah Pioneers.

== The interior ==
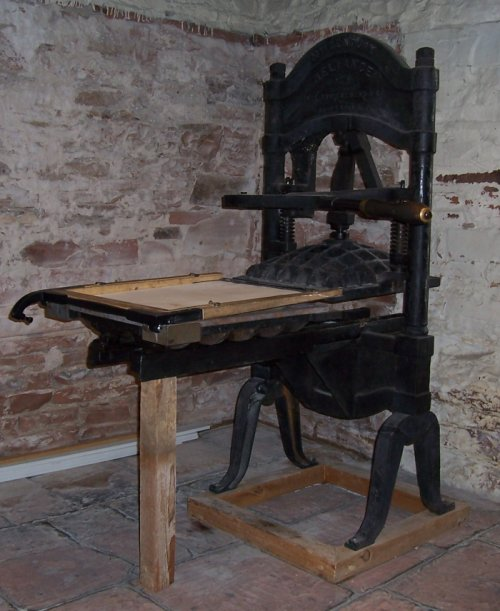
An historic printing press displayed in the statehouse, which once printed the Deseret News.

=== The basement ===
The basement currently contains several exhibits, including:

- The Deseret News printing press: In July 1857, rumors of Johnston's Army approaching spread throughout Utah. Mormon leaders decided that the Deseret News printing press should be moved from Salt Lake City and hidden in the basement of the statehouse in Fillmore. Because the press was a vital means of communication, they decided to move it beyond the Provo evacuation point.
- Model of the statehouse: The basement also contains a model of what the Territorial Statehouse would have looked like, had it been completed.
- Jail cell: In the late 19th and early 20th century, a room in the basement of the Territorial Statehouse was used by local authorities as a jail. Prisoners were shackled to the floor, and bars were placed on the windows. Offenses which resulted in possible jail sentences included drunkenness, fighting, profanity and unlawful horseback riding.

=== The first floor ===
The first floor consists of a hallway and several rooms. Some of the rooms are described below:

- The Teachers Room: Today, this room looks just as it did in the late 19th century when the Territorial Statehouse served as a Presbyterian mission school. After the American Civil War, missionaries of many faiths flooded Utah in an attempt to convert Mormons and bring about a speedy end to polygamy. On the political end, laws were created to make polygamy illegal. In the religious sector, several churches organized mission schools in Utah to help combat polygamy. The Territorial Statehouse was turned over to the Presbyterian Church to run as a mission school.
- The Governor's Office: Brigham Young designated this room as the Governor's office because it caught the morning and afternoon sunlight, which was considered by many to be preferable to lamp or candlelight.

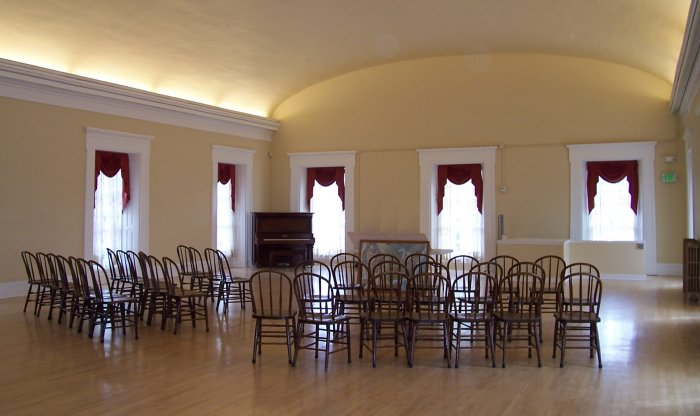
Second floor of the Territorial Statehouse

=== The second floor ===
The second floor consists of the Assembly Hall where the territorial legislature met. The Assembly Hall contains a piano, a podium and several chairs. It also contains maps showing the location and size of the Utah Territory.

== See also ==
- Utah Territorial Legislature
- Brigham Young
- Millard County, Utah
