= 5th Utah Territorial Legislature =

The 5th Utah Territorial Legislature was elected on August 6, 1855.

== Session ==
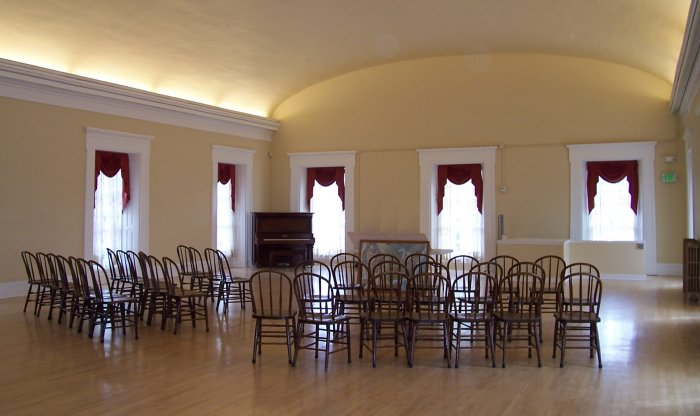
The assembly hall in the Territorial Statehouse where the legislature met

The legislative session convened on December 10, 1855, at the Territorial Statehouse in Fillmore and concluded on January 18, 1856. Although Fillmore was designated as the territorial seat of government in 1851, the Statehouse was only partially completed, making this the first legislature to meet there. It was the only complete session held in Fillmore, as subsequent sessions returned to meeting in Salt Lake City.

== Members ==
Name	County	Office	Notes
Territorial Council:
Albert Carrington	Salt Lake		
Lorin Farr	Weber		
Leonard E. Harrington	Utah		
Benjamin F. Johnson	Utah		
Heber C. Kimball	Salt Lake	President	
Isaac Morley	San Pete		
Orson Pratt	Salt Lake		
John A. Ray	Millard		
George A. Smith	Iron		
Lorenzo Snow	Weber		
John Stoker	Davis		
Daniel H. Wells	Salt Lake		
Wilford Woodruff	Salt Lake		
Territorial House of Representatives:
Ezra T. Benson	Tooele		
Jacob G. Bigler	Juab		
James Brown	Weber		
James W. Cummings	Salt Lake		
John Eldredge	Millard		
Jedediah M. Grant	Salt Lake	Speaker	
Isaac C. Haight	Iron		
Lorenzo H. Hatch	Utah		
William A. Hickman	Green River		
Jesse Hobson	Davis		
Aaron Johnson	Utah		
Jesse C. Little	Salt Lake		
John D. Parker	Davis		
George Peacock	San Pete		
William W. Phelps	Salt Lake		
Enoch Reese	Carson		
Samuel W. Richards	Salt Lake		
Albert P. Rockwood	Salt Lake		
Jesse N. Smith	Iron		
James C. Snow	Utah		
William Snow	Salt Lake		
Claudius V. Spencer	Salt Lake		
Hosea Stout	Salt Lake		
Edwin D. Woolley	Salt Lake		
Jonathan C. Wright	Salt Lake		
Phineas H. Young	Salt Lake		
