= The Industrial Christian Home for Polygamous Wives =

Women's refuge in Salt Lake City, Utah

Coordinates: 40.766082°N 111.876295°W

Photographed by Charles Roscoe Savage

The Industrial Christian Home for Polygamous Wives (or The Industrial Christian Home) was a women's refuge created in 1886 in Salt Lake City. Due to several conflicts, including low occupancy, the facility closed in 1893. The building was subsequently used as the seat of the Utah State Legislature, as a hotel, as officer's quarters in World War II, then finally as a private club until it was demolished in 1985.

== History ==
The Industrial Christian Home Association was founded by Angelia Thurston Newman ("Angie") in March 1886. Newman, a member of the Women's Christian Temperance Union, was a resident of Nebraska when she became aware of polygamy in Utah while visiting relatives there in 1876. She was determined to provide a safe haven for women in polygamous marriages, and by 1883 had financial backing from the Methodist Episcopal Woman's Home Missionary Society. When she eventually parted ways with the missionary society, Newman teamed up with women who were largely Protestant and ex-members of the defunct Ladies Anti-Polygamy Society (or the Womans National Anti-polygamy Society), including among their number the active Jennie Anderson Froiseth, editor of The Anti-Polygamy Standard.

Representing the group before the Senate Committee on Education and Labor in Washington, D.C., Newman successfully secured an initial $40,000 in federal funds. The Industrial Christian Home opened in a temporary location in December 1886, overseen by a Congressionally appointed "Board of Control" (the Utah Commission), headed by territorial governors Eli H. Murray and Caleb Walton West. A dispute ensued when the women questioned who should be responsible for financial oversight. Newman appealed directly to President Grover Cleveland for intervention, who then delegated the matter to the Secretary of the Interior.

Organizational problems arose due to conflicts between the board and the staff, which were further complicated by efforts from Mormons to discredit the entire enterprise. In the first nine months, 154 applications were submitted, but most were rejected by the board. They reasoned that monogamous wives, first wives, and children of polygamists would not be eligible for assistance. The mission staff restricted access to those they deemed to be in illegal marriages—specifically, second and third wives. Also excluded were those who rejected polygamy or Mormonism altogether.

In 1888—1889 Congress approved funds for an elaborate new home. An additional appropriation of $80,000 ($75,000 for building and $5,000 for contingent expenses) paid for the construction of a large building at 145 South 500 East in Salt Lake City. The home opened in June 1889. It never had enough residents to fill its capacious accommodation. It closed in 1893.

== Later uses of the building ==
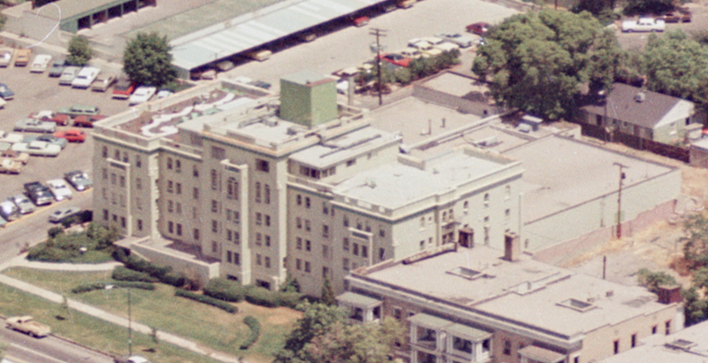
The structure in 1978, when it was being used by the Ambassador Athletic Club

Briefly the building was the home of the Utah legislature. Afterwards it became a residential hotel – the Fifth East Hotel. During World War II it housed military officers.

In 1945 it became the Ambassador Athletic Club.

The building was demolished in 1985.

== See also ==
- Mormonism and polygamy
