= Hotel Paris (Idaho) =

- U.S. National Register of Historic Places
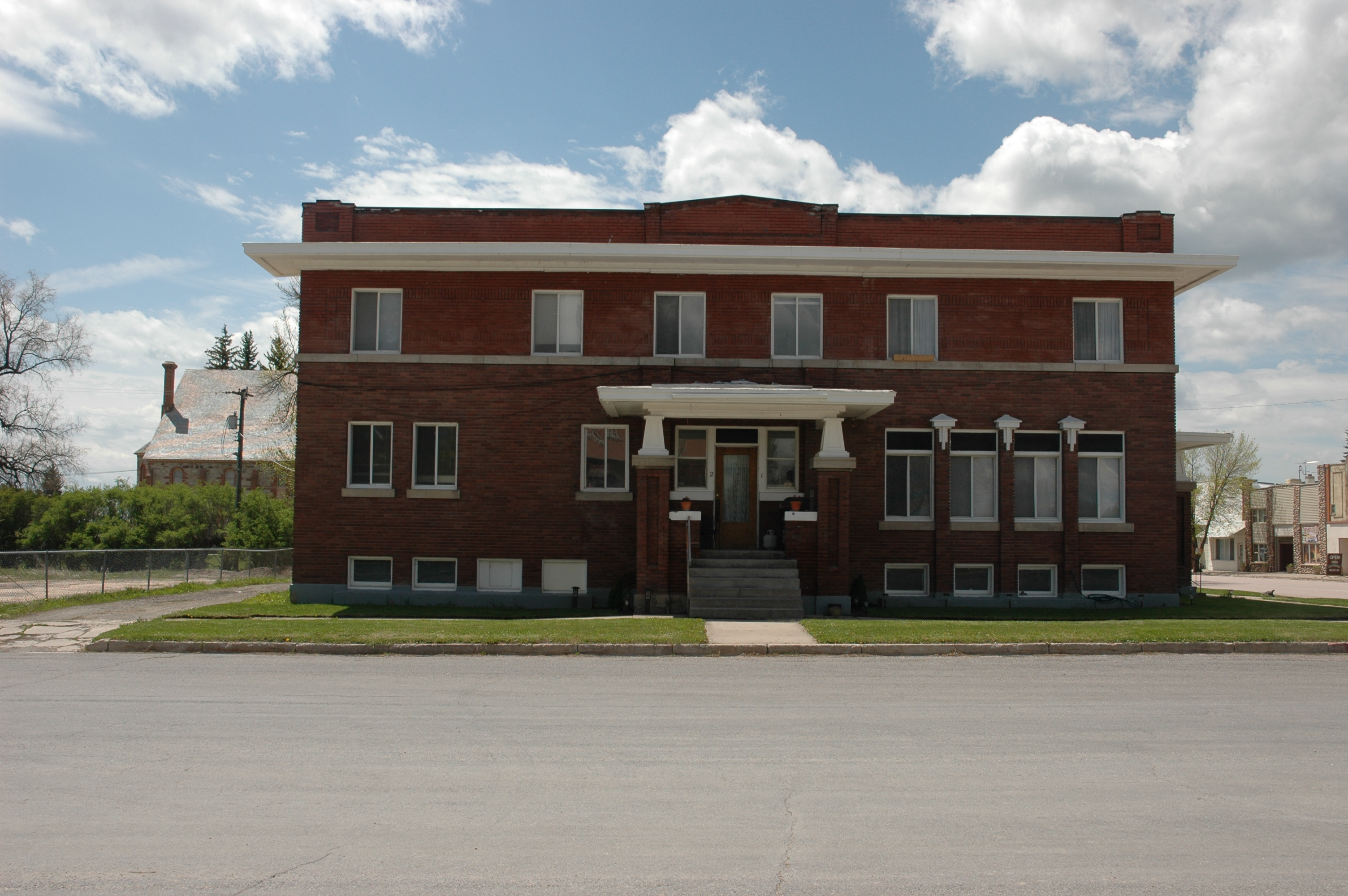

- Location within Idaho Location within the United States
- Location: 7 S. Main St., Paris, Idaho
- Coordinates: 42°13′36″N 111°23′59″W
- Area: less than one acre
- Built: 1916
- Architect: Shreeve & Madsen; Sorenson, Louis
- Architectural style: Prairie School, Bungalow/craftsman
- MPS: Paris MRA
- NRHP reference No.: 82000275
- Added to NRHP: November 18, 1982

The Hotel Paris, at 7 S. Main St. in Paris, Idaho, is a historic hotel that was built in 1916.

The hotel's design includes elements of the Prairie School and bungalow styles. The brick building has flat-roofed porches supported by wooden piers on both street-facing sides. A flat cornice rests below the hotel's roof line. While the Paris Public School also has a horizontal emphasis in its design, the hotel's blend of its two styles is unique in Paris.

It was listed on the National Register of Historic Places in 1982.

The hotel is still in operation. It is located next to the historic LDS Tabernacle and a museum in downtown Paris.
