= Paris Public School =

- U.S. National Register of Historic Places
- Location within Idaho Location within the United States
- Location: Main and 1st Sts., North, Paris, Idaho
- Coordinates: 42°13′42″N 111°24′00″W
- Area: less than one acre
- Built: 1918
- Architect: Watkins, Richard C.
- Architectural style: Prairie School
- MPS: Paris MRA
- NRHP reference No.: 82000290
- Added to NRHP: November 18, 1982

The Paris Public School, at Main and 1st Sts., North, in Paris, Idaho, is a historic school that is listed on the National Register of Historic Places. It is a brick building. It was designed by architect Richard C. Watkins in Prairie School style and was built in 1918.

It is significant partly for reflecting a local fad: the school, the Hotel Paris, the Les and Hazel Shepherd Bungalow, and the LDS Stake Office Building (all also NRHP-listed in Paris), reflect the Prairie style, which is otherwise relatively rare in Idaho. According to a 1980 study, the style's unusual popularity in Paris gives the city a sense of architectural unity. The same study called the Public School the best and most representative example of the Prairie School in the city.

It was listed on the National Register in 1982.
