= Peter Wentz House =

Historic house in Utah, United States

- Peter Mastin Wentz House
- U.S. National Register of Historic Places
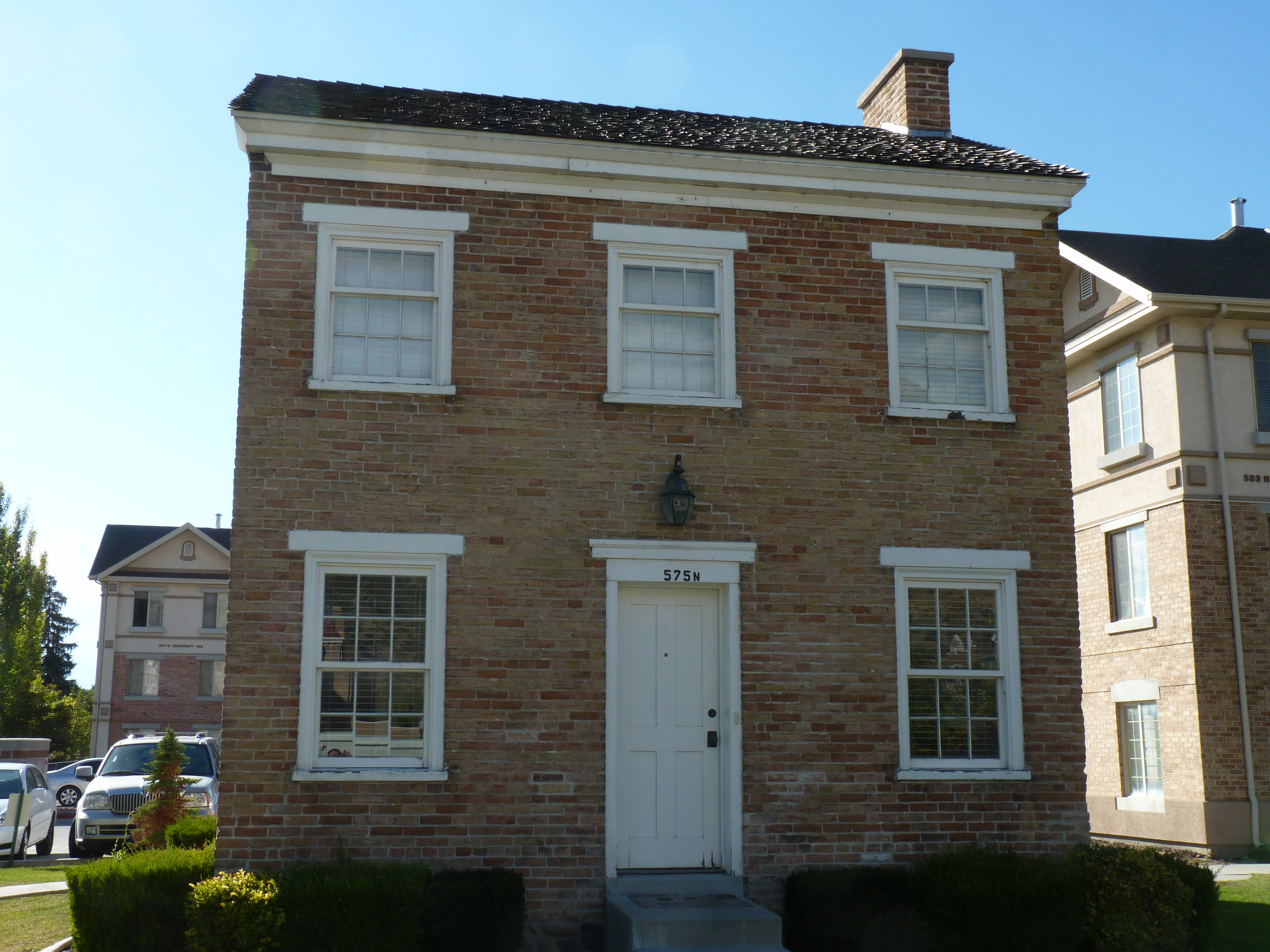
- Peter Mastin Wentz House, September 2011

- Location within Utah Location within the United States
- Interactive map showing the location of Peter Wentz House
- Location: 575 North University Avenue; Provo, Utah; United States
- Coordinates: 40°14′28″N 111°39′30″W
- Area: less than one acre
- Built: 1866
- Architectural style: Federal, Vernacular Federal
- NRHP reference No.: 78002703
- Added to NRHP: April 26, 1978

The Peter Mastin Wentz House is a historic building located in northern downtown Provo, Utah, United States. It is listed on the National Register of Historic Places.

== Description ==
Built sometime between 1866 and 1870, the Wentz home is reminiscent of the Federal row-house design predominantly found in the Eastern United States. The Peter Mastin Wentz House was designated to the Provo City Historic Landmarks Registry on April 26, 1996. Although located across the street (North University Avenue) from the historic Brigham Young Academy (now Provo City Library), it is immediately surrounded on all sides by modern condominiums.

=== Structure ===
The Peter Mastin Wentz House is a two-story salt-box residence built on a foundation of cobblestone. The exterior cornice of the home boasts crown molding trim, however the rest of the outward appearance of the home is quite plain. Two fireplaces still exist in the home, and the home also contains a stone cellar. The Wentz home is one room wide and two stories tall. The front facade of the home is symmetrical. All bays have wooden sills and lintels. The house remains functional and structurally sound.

=== Peter Mastin Wentz ===
Born on July 3, of 1831 in Wayne County, Pennsylvania, Peter Mastin Wentz was born into Methodist lifestyle. He was one of eight children to his mother, Mercy Green. His father, also named Peter, was a Methodist minister. His family eventually encountered turmoil, due to the death of Peter's mother and the failure of finances within the family. Still in his youth, Peter had to leave home and education behind, apprenticing as a boot and shoemaker.

In his twentieth year, Peter embraced the beliefs of the Church of Jesus Christ of Latter-day Saints (LDS Church), converting to the religion. Desiring to be a part of the main mass of members of the church at that time, Wentz travelled to Nauvoo, Illinois then to St. Louis, Missouri, and eventually walked the long trail to Salt Lake City, Utah. Years later, in 1871, Peter served as a missionary for the church in New York.

In 1857, Peter Mastin Wentz settled in the city of Provo, where he employed himself in the boot and shoe business. For the next several years, Wentz carried goods, traded goods, and prospected in the state of Montana. Wentz married Minerva Boren in 1864, and they were the parents of ten children.

Wentz continued on to be a great asset to the Provo community. Serving on the Provo City Council for ten years, serving as a Justice of the Peace, and serving as director and secretary of the Provo Bench Corral and Irrigation Company for sixteen years. He also continued to serve in the LDS Church, as the first bishop in the Timpanogas Ward, a position in which he served for eighteen years.

The house was listed on the National Register of Historic Places in 1978.

== See also ==
- National Register of Historic Places listings in Utah County, Utah
