= Don Carlos Young =

American architect

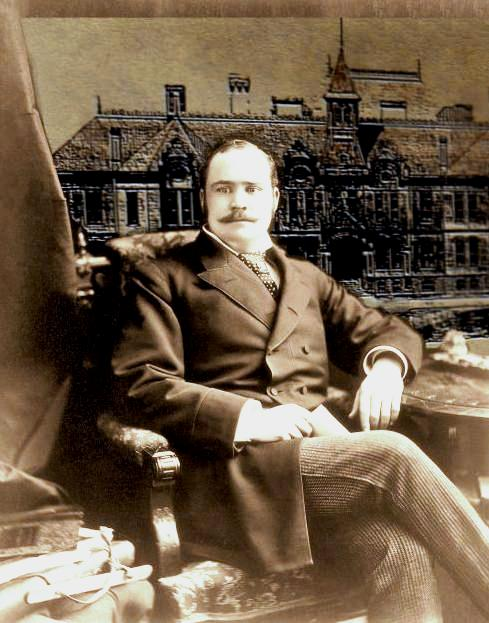

Church Architect
- 1887 – 1893
- Called by: Wilford Woodruff
- Predecessor: Truman O. Angell
- End reason: Office dissolved

Personal details
- Born: Joseph Don Carlos Young; May 6, 1855; Salt Lake City, Utah Territory
- Died: October 19, 1938 (aged 83); Salt Lake City, Utah
- Resting place: Salt Lake City Cemetery; 40°46′37.92″N 111°51′28.8″W
- Alma mater: Rensselaer Polytechnic Institute; University of Deseret
- Notable works: Architect for the Salt Lake Temple, Brigham Young Academy (Provo, Utah) and Bear Lake Tabernacle (Paris, Idaho)
- Spouse(s): Alice Naomi Dowden (1881); Marian Penelope Hardy (1887)
- Parents: Brigham Young; Emily Dow Partridge
- Signature

Joseph Don Carlos Young (May 6, 1855 – October 19, 1938) was an American architect and the Church Architect for the Church of Jesus Christ of Latter-day Saints (LDS Church) from 1887 until 1893. In 1893, the office of Church Architect was dissolved (to be reinstated for a time in the mid 20th century), Young thereafter practiced privately with the LDS Church as a frequent client. Young practiced as an architect, landscape architect and designer from 1879 to circa 1935. A preponderance of his work centered on church commissions, or commissions offered him by extended Young family members, or higher echelon church friends.

== Early life ==
Young was born in Salt Lake City, Utah Territory, the son of Brigham Young and Emily Dow Partridge (a daughter of Edward Partridge). He studied at the University of Deseret and then the Rensselaer Polytechnic Institute at Troy, New York. At Rensselaer he studied civil engineering and architecture.

== Early career ==
After graduating in 1879, Young returned to Salt Lake City and practiced as a railroad engineer; gradually his first love of architecture, landscape architecture and design took precedence over engineering. Young is considered Utah's first academically trained architect and landscape architect. He married Alice Naomi Dowden on 22 September 1881. They had ten children. Young entered into a polygamist marriage on January 11, 1887, when he married Marion Penelope Hardy in Juarez, Mexico. Young and Hardy were married, or sealed, by church apostle Erastus Snow.

As his father had hoped, Young taught in Utah's schools, first as an instructor and later as a professor of "architecture and mechanical drawing" at the University of Deseret (Salt Lake City) from 1883 to 1888; and later as a teacher of mathematics at Brigham Young Academy (Provo, Utah) from 1897 to 1900. Young also served on the Brigham Young Academy's Board of Trustees from 1886 to 1901. Young also served two terms in Utah's Territorial Legislature (1883–1887).

Young's early landscape design commissions include the Utah Territorial Insane Asylum (1881, with architect John H. Burton as the asylum architect) and Salt Lake City's Liberty Park (1881–83, via a public design competition). These commissions represent Utah's earliest academically informed landscape design projects. Young's noteworthy early architecture commissions include a dormitory for Brigham Young College (1882–1885; Logan, Utah Territory), the Bear Lake Stake Tabernacle (1883–1888; Paris, Idaho), the Brigham Young Academy (designed in 1884, completed 1892; Provo, Utah Territory) and the Templeton (Zion's Bank) Building (designed in 1883, completed 1890; Salt Lake City). The Bear Lake Tabernacle and the Brigham Young Academy buildings are extant examples of Young's early design work, and are considered two of the LDS Church's most beloved last 19th century architectural landmarks.

== Appointment as LDS Church Architect ==
In 1887, after the death of Truman O. Angell, Young was appointed Church Architect, and the architect for the Salt Lake Temple, by church president Wilford Woodruff. After re-designing the towers and finials, and the final appearance of the windows, Young focused his energies on designing the temple's lavish late Victorian/Neo-baroque interior. Besides the construction of interior supports, none of the interior designs drawn by Angell (or Wm. Ward, Wm. H. Folsom, and Angell's son, T.O. Angell Jr.) had been executed. Thus as Angell is considered the primary architect of the temple's exterior, Young is considered the primary architect for its interior. He also designed the temple's original Annex, the Temple Square electrical system, heating plant and greenhouse/conservatory, and the general landscape design for Temple Square. With the completion of the Salt Lake Temple in 1893, Young was released as Church Architect.

== Mid to late career ==
At mid-career Young practiced with his oldest son, Don Carlos Young, as Young & Son, Architects; and was responsible for the design of the 2nd Eagle Gate (c. 1892, an overarching symbolic gateway to Brigham Young's Salt Lake farm), Latter-day Saint University (later LDS College and LDS Business College, located on the corner of North Temple and Main Street); the LDS Church's Bishop's Building (50 North Main St.), and the Church Administration Building (47 East South Temple).

Between c. 1920 and 1935, he practiced as an institutional architect, designing (or supervising the designs) of hundreds of different yet mildly standard plan-like buildings for the LDS Church. Young worked for his step brother, Willard Young, who served as head of the church's building department. Thus, even though he was no longer sustained in the church's general conference as church architect, Young was essentially described as such from 1887 to this death.

== Influence on other architects ==
Young acted as mentor to dozens of younger architects and engineers, including many of his own children. This familial list includes Don Carlos (Don) Young Jr., who assisted his father in a failed circa 1911-1917 bid to design the Utah State Capital building. Young & Son took second place behind Salt Lake City architect Richard K.A. Kletting. D. C. Young Jr., was also responsible for designing with Danish emigrant Ramm Hansen (as Young & Hansen, architects) the LDS Church's flagship meetinghouse in Washington, D.C., known as the "Washington Chapel," located on 2810 Sixteenth Street, N.W., sheathed no less in railroad shipped Utah granite. Finally, J. D. C. Young's youngest son, George Cannon Young, was also a successful mid-20th century Utah architect. With his son, Richard Young, G. C. Young designed the LDS Church's twenty-eight story Church Office Building (completed 1972; Salt Lake City) which was the tallest building in Salt Lake City until 1998.

== Death ==
Young died in 1938 in Salt Lake City as the oldest remaining son of Brigham Young.

== Images of works ==
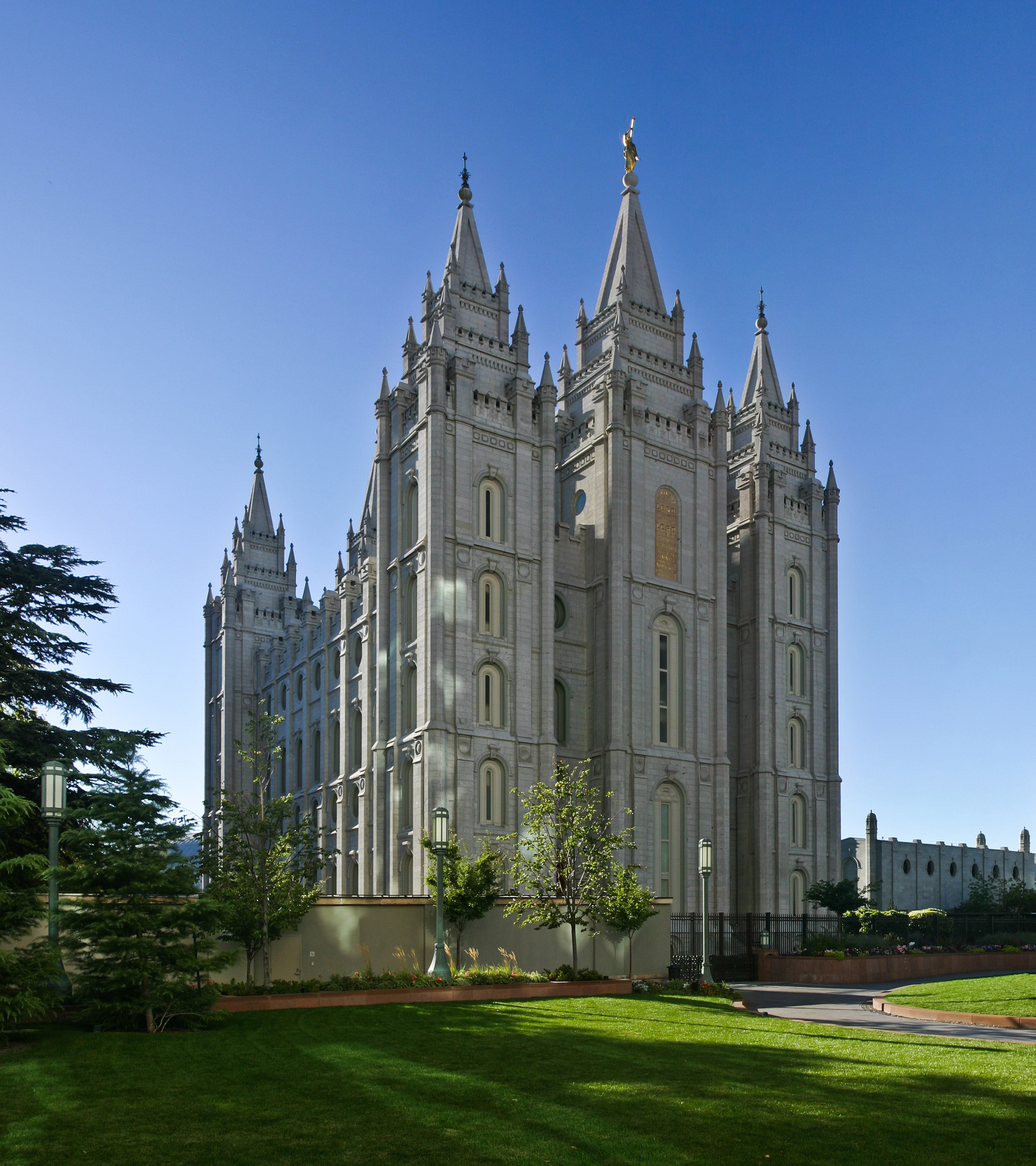
Salt Lake Temple

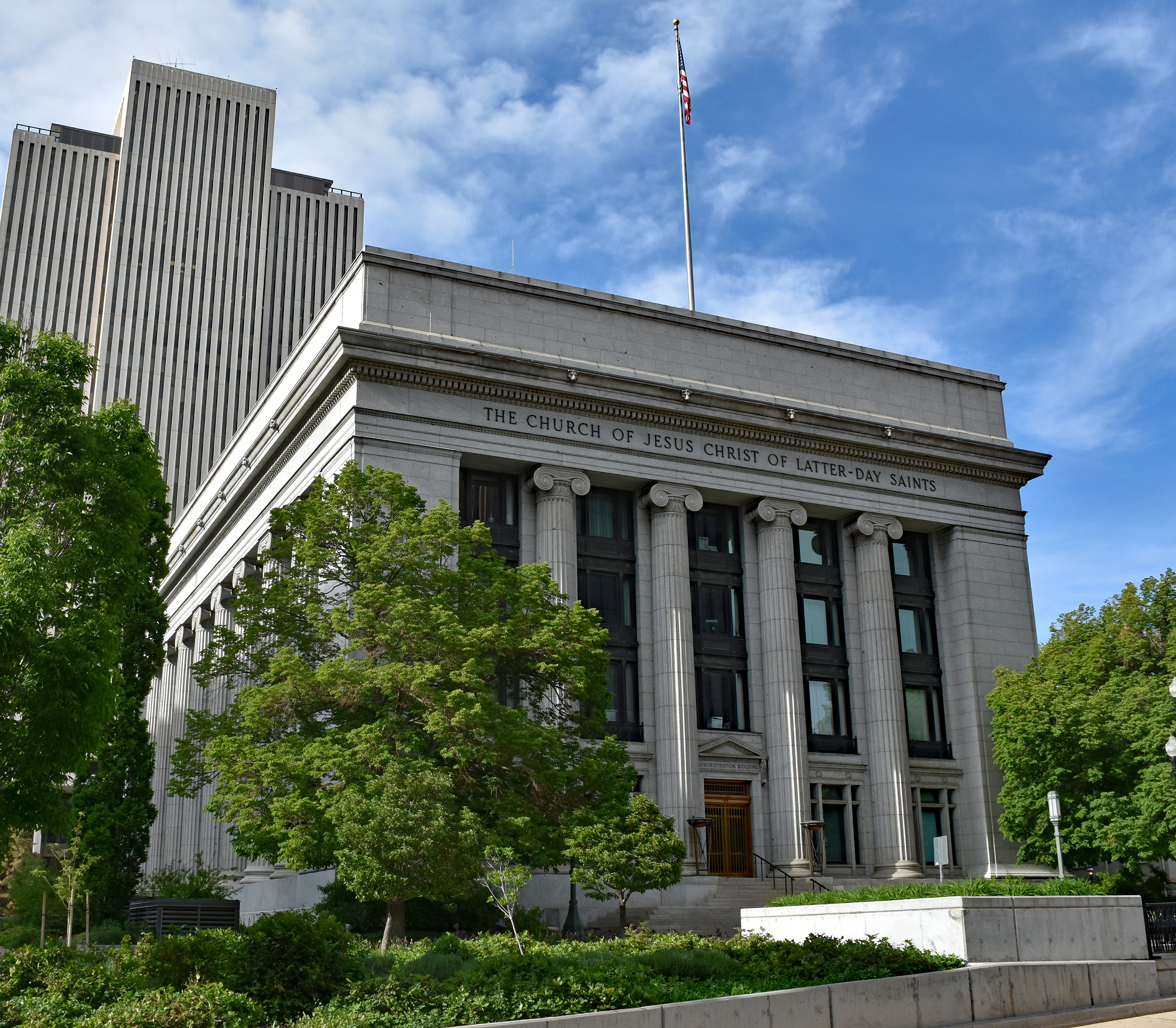
LDS Church Administration Building

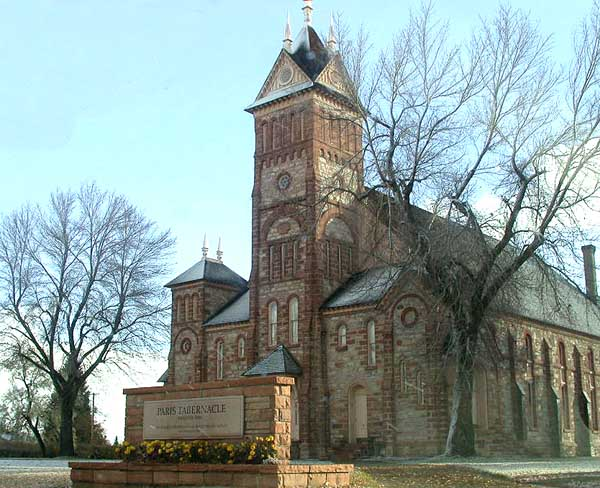
Bear Lake Stake Tabernacle

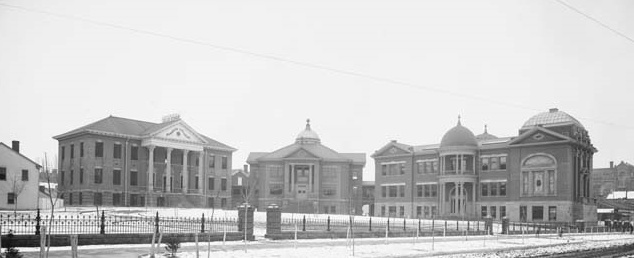
Latter-day Saints' University

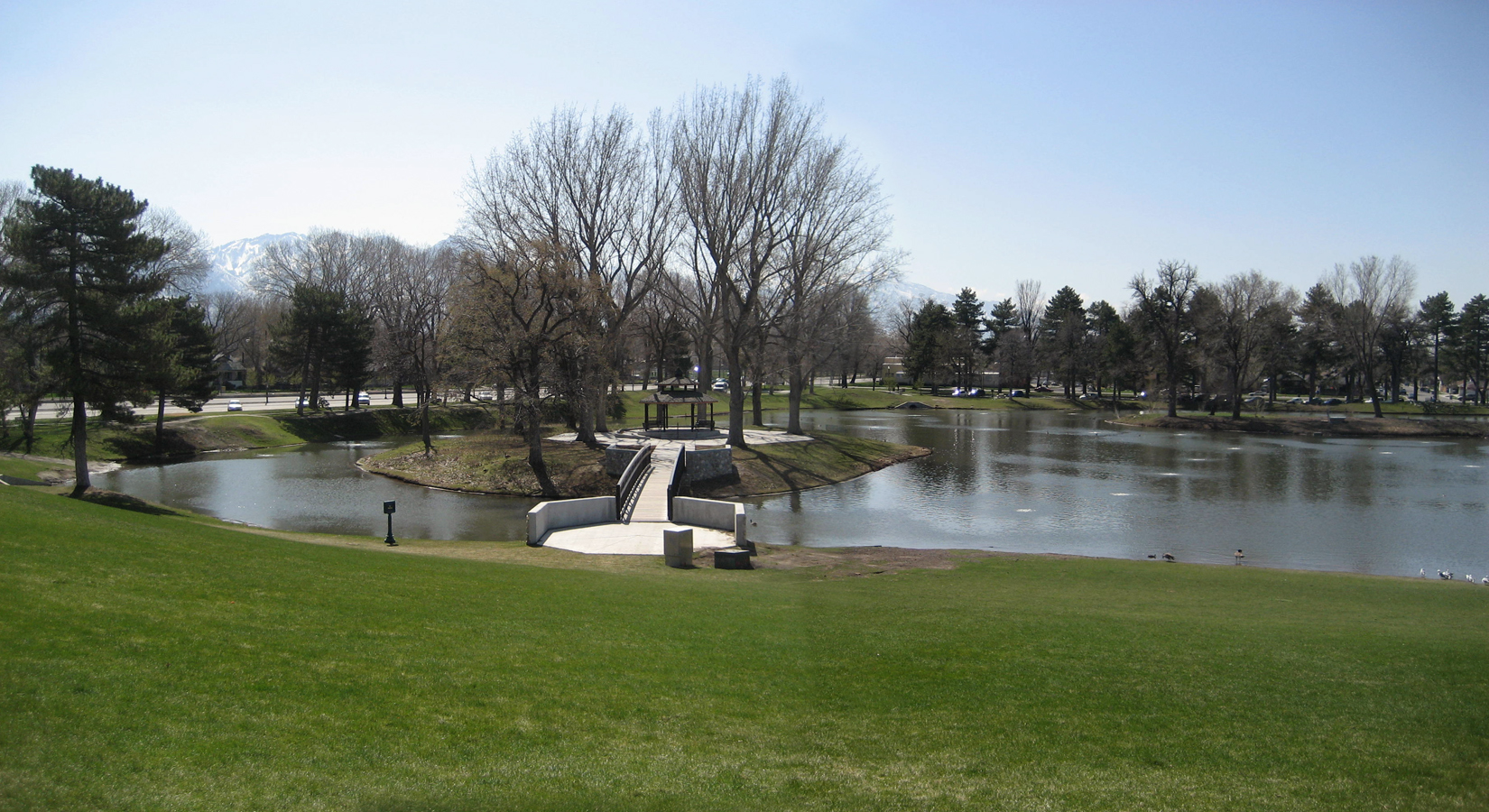
Liberty Park

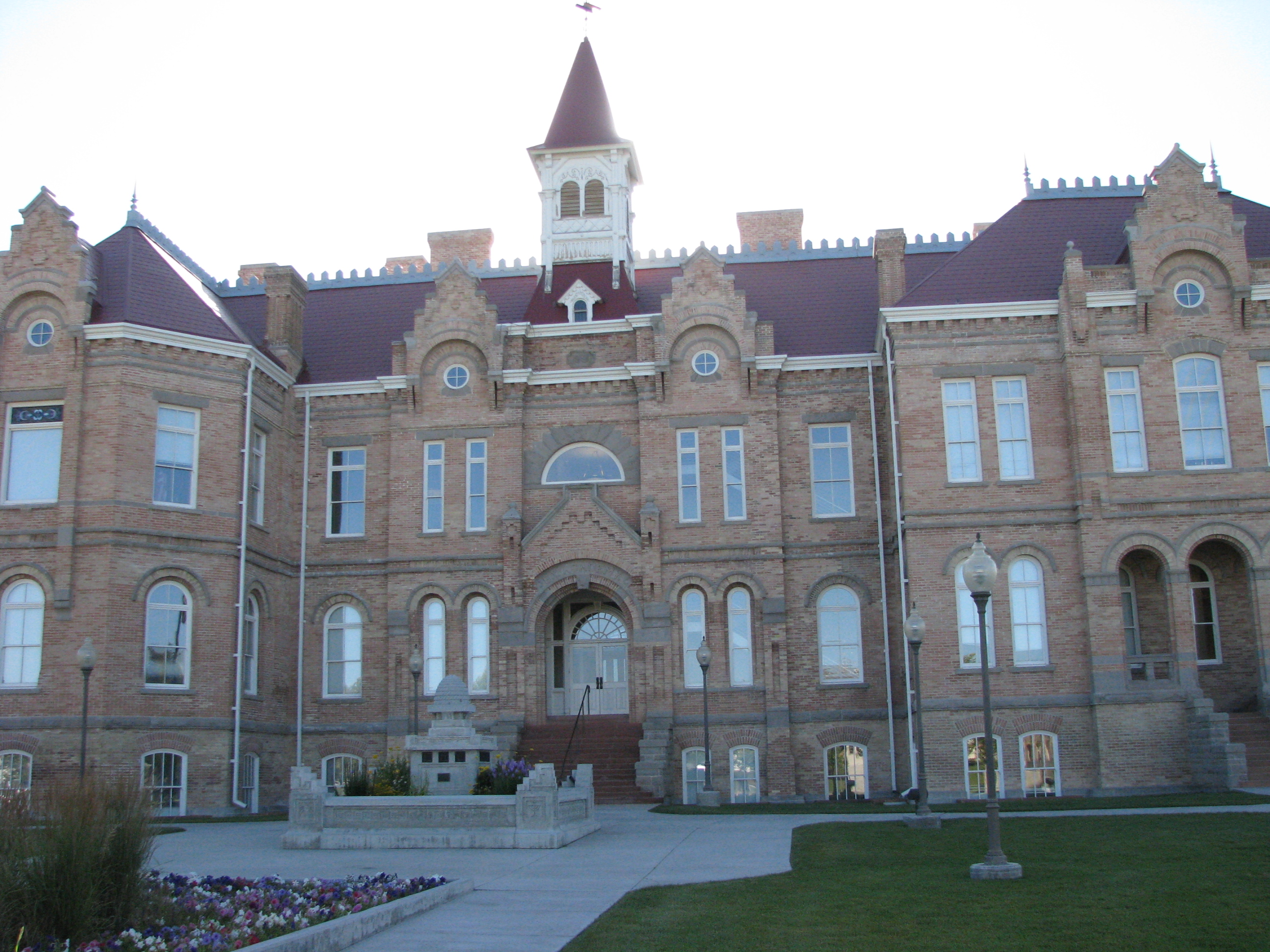
Provo City Library

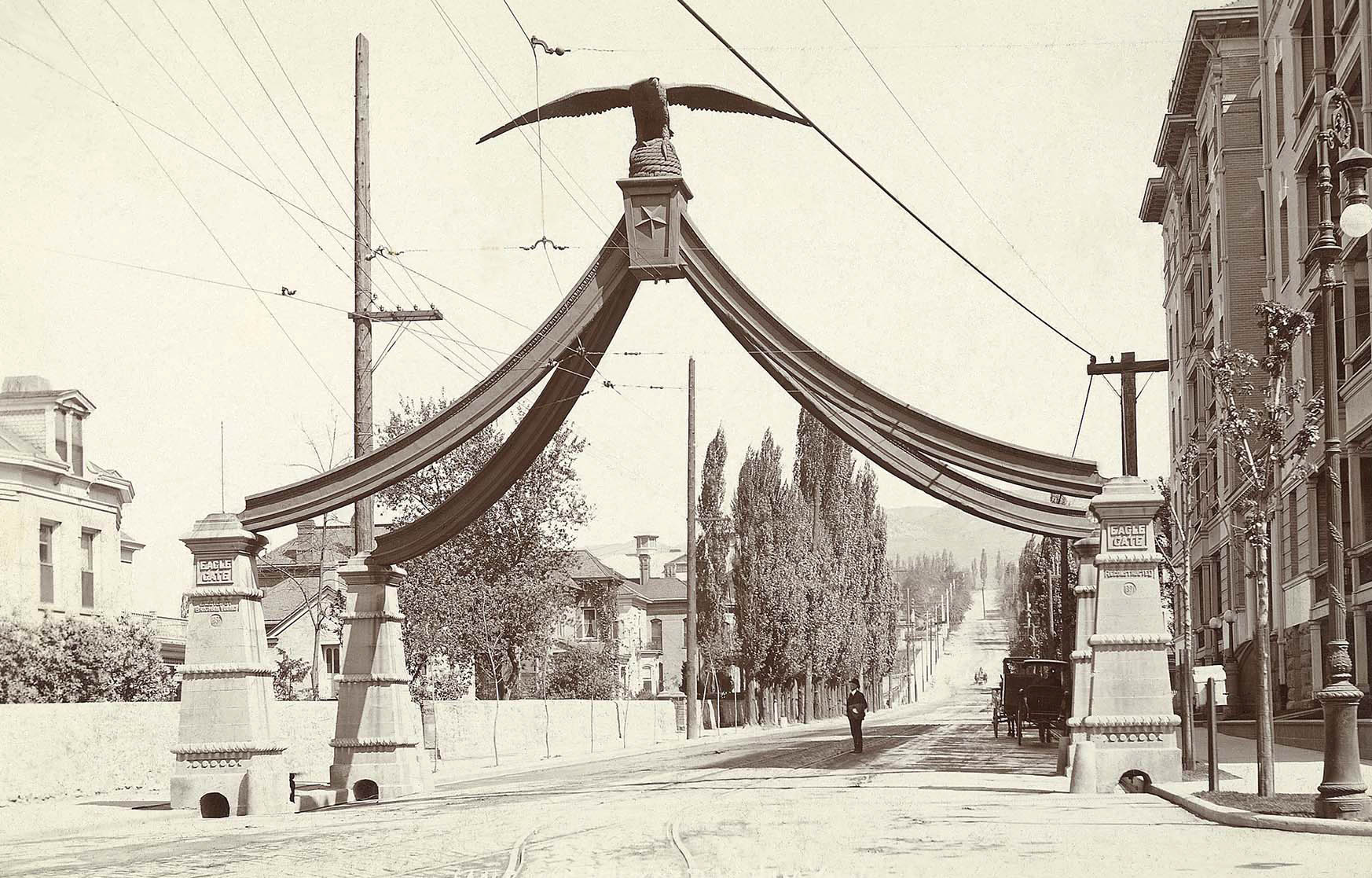
Eagle Gate (2nd)

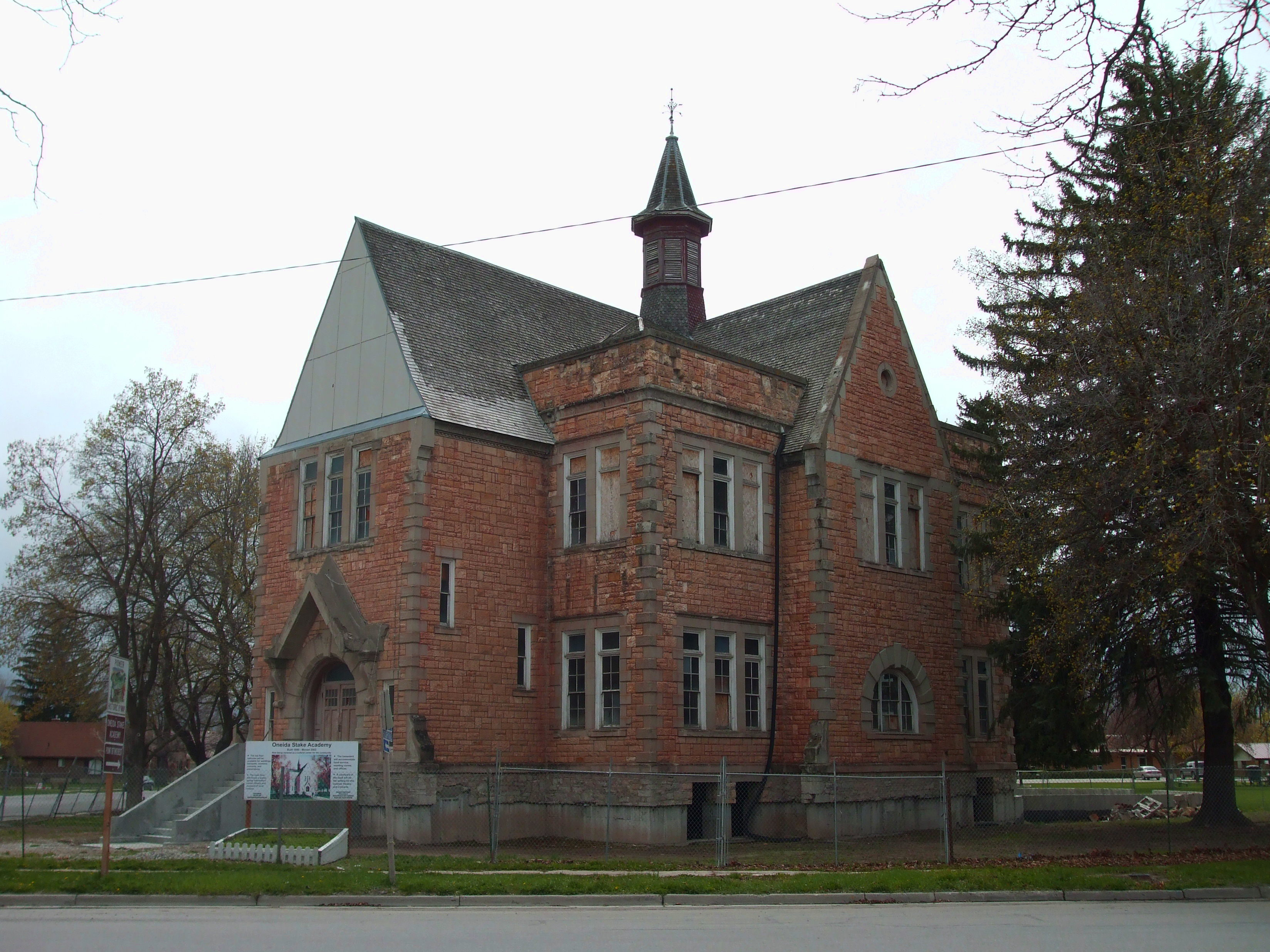
Oneida Stake Academy

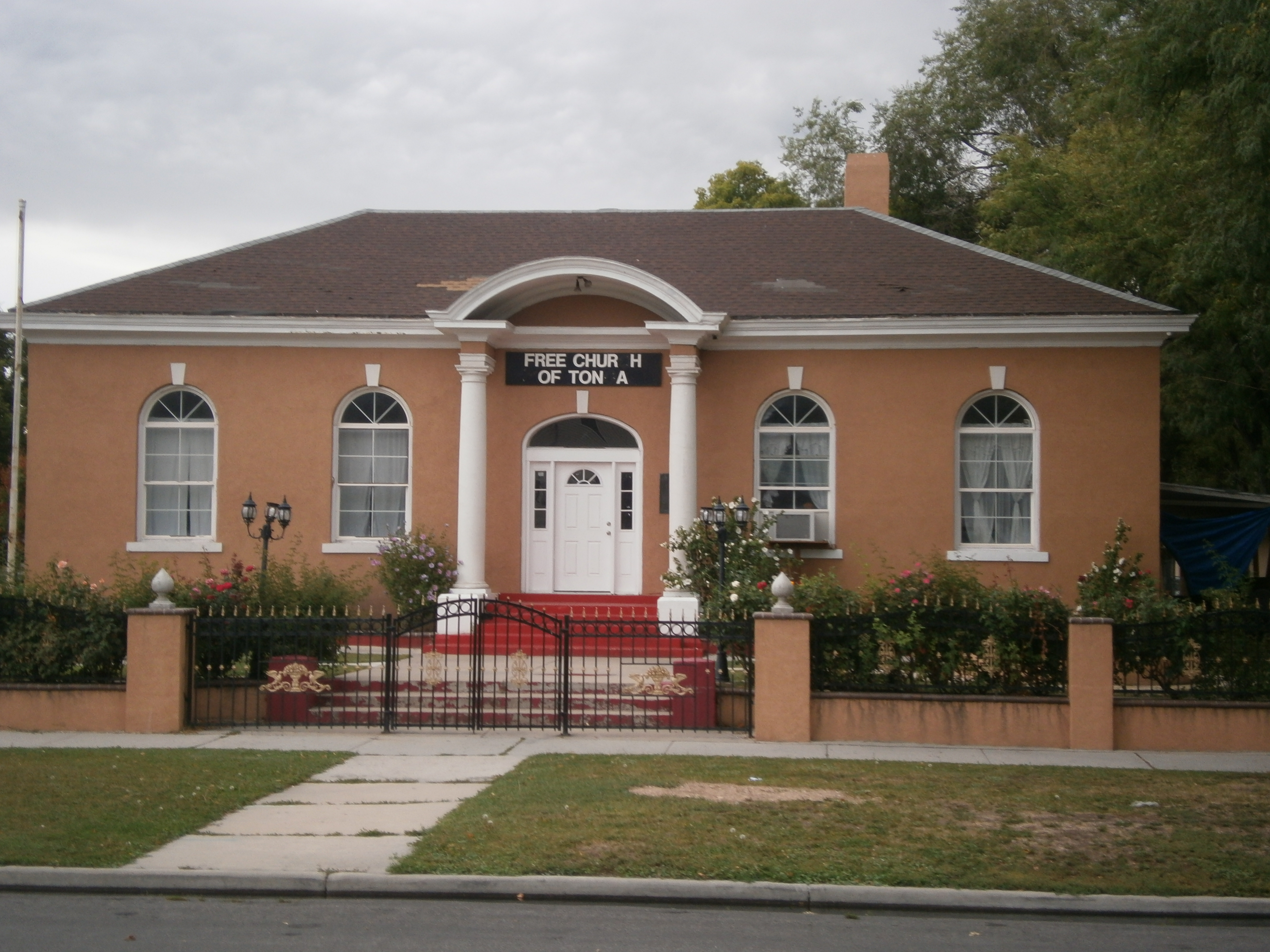
Spencer Branch Library
