= LDS Stake Office Building =

- U.S. National Register of Historic Places
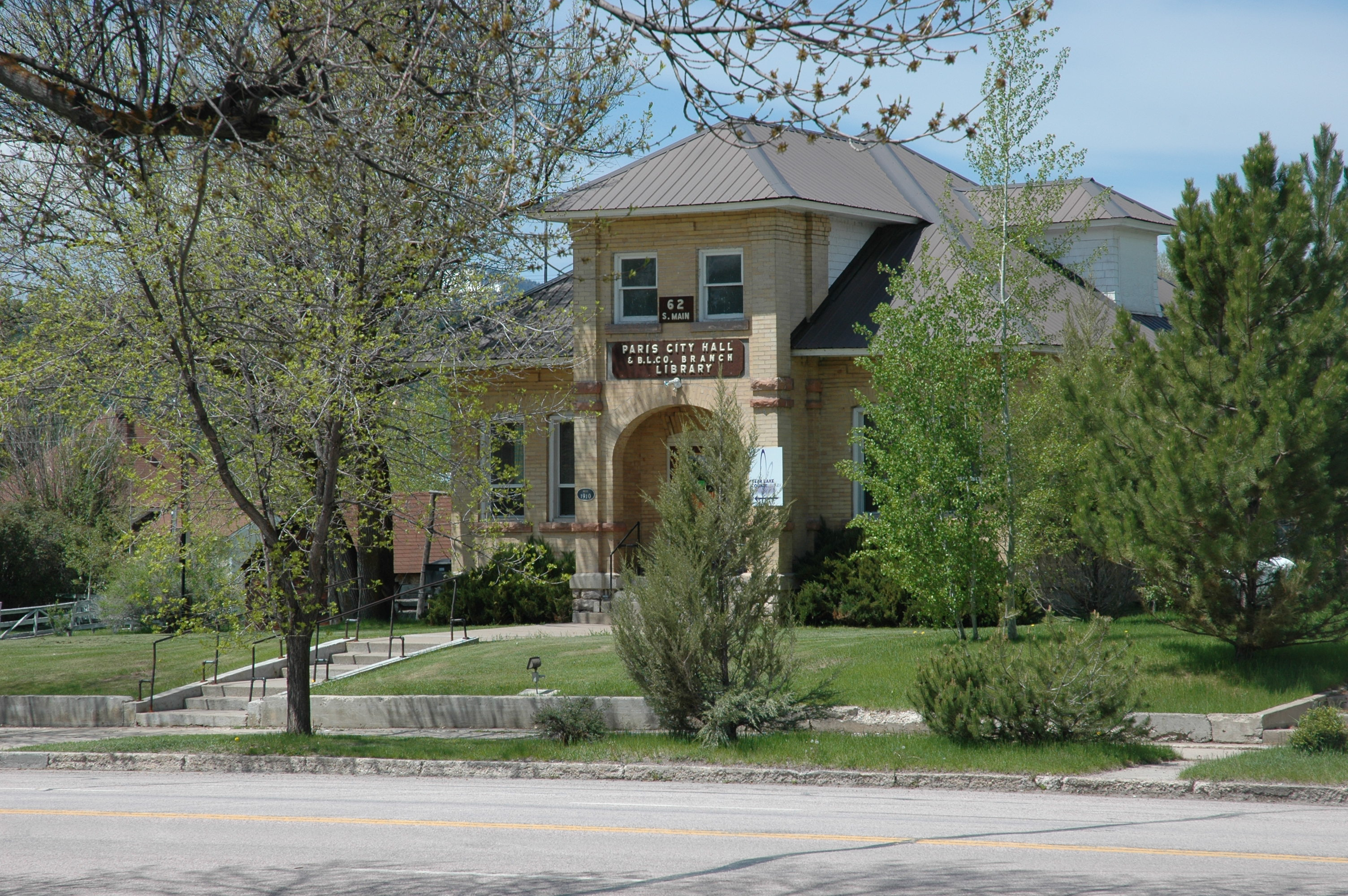

- Location within Idaho Location within the United States
- Location: S. Main St., Paris, Idaho
- Coordinates: 42°13′32″N 111°24′3″W
- Area: less than one acre
- Built: 1910
- Built by: Shepherd, H.R.
- Architectural style: Late 19th and Early 20th Century American Movements, Late Victorian
- MPS: Paris MRA
- NRHP reference No.: 82000280
- Added to NRHP: November 18, 1982

The LDS Stake Office Building in Paris, Idaho was built in 1910. It was listed on the National Register of Historic Places in 1982.

It is a one-and-a-half-story building which is approximately square in plan. Its exterior is smooth buff-colored brick. Its design has elements of bungalow, Prairie, and commercial Romanesque Revival architectural styles.

It was the local stake office which provided regional administration of the Church of Jesus Christ of Latter-day Saints.

== See also ==
- Bear Lake Stake Tabernacle, also NRHP-listed
