= Bear Lake Stake Tabernacle =

Historic church in Idaho, United States

- U.S. National Register of Historic Places
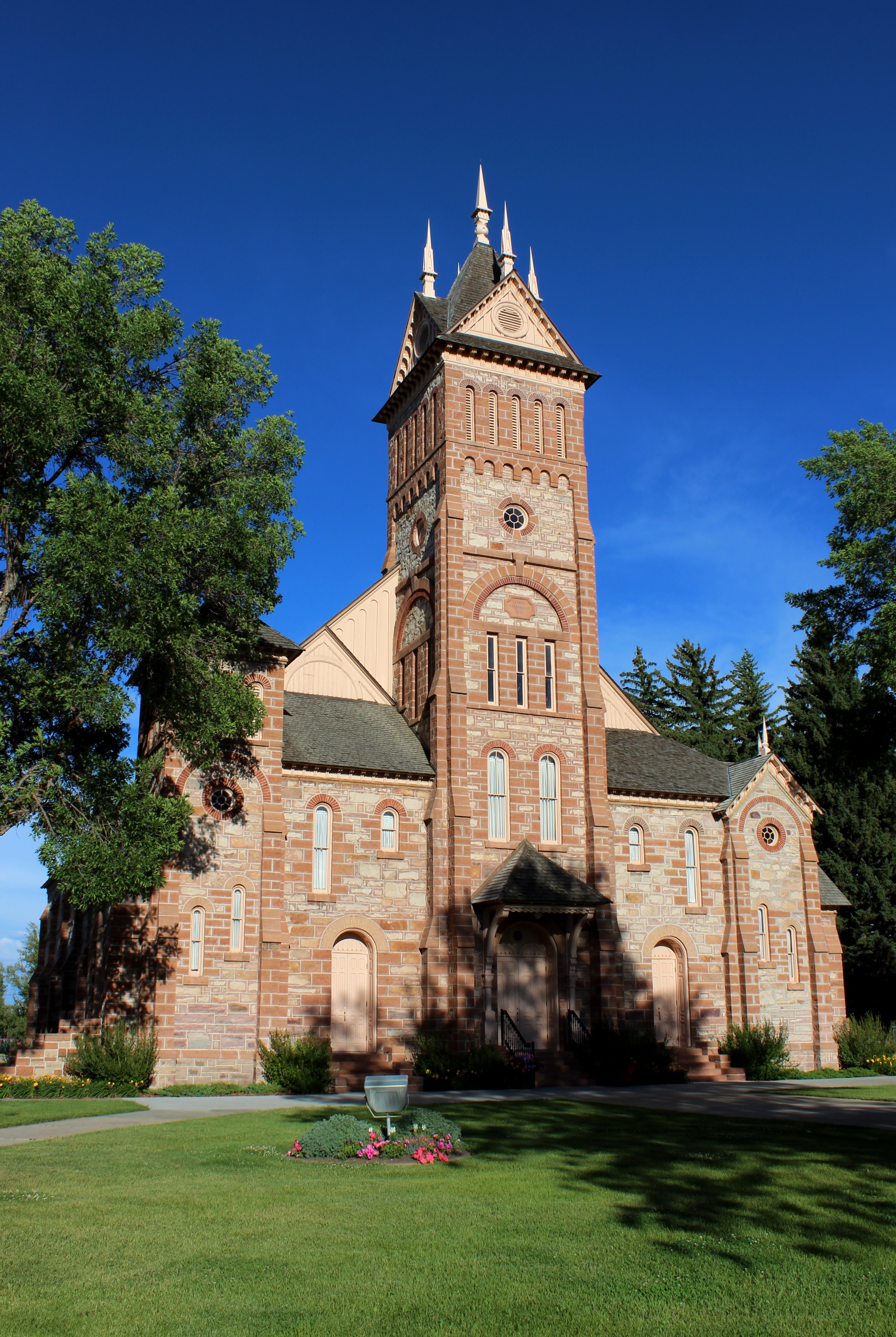
- Stone Tabernacle (Bear Lake Stake Tabernacle), c. 1889

- Location within Idaho Location within the United States
- Location: 109 S. Main St., Paris, Idaho
- Coordinates: 42°13′33″N 111°24′01″W
- Built: 1884; 142 years ago to 1889; 137 years ago
- Architect: Joseph Don Carlos Young
- NRHP reference No.: 72000436
- Added to NRHP: December 8, 1972

The Bear Lake Stake Tabernacle, or Paris Tabernacle is situated on main street in Paris, Idaho, is a Romanesque red sandstone meetinghouse of the Church of Jesus Christ of Latter-day Saints (LDS Church) designed by Joseph Don Carlos Young, the son of Brigham Young, built between 1884 and 1889. The tabernacle was built by Mormon pioneers of Bear Lake Valley who used horse and ox teams to haul rock quarried from Indian Creek Canyon, nearly 18 miles away. After completion of the Logan Utah Temple in 1884, workers began construction of the tabernacle, which was supervised by William Budge. It cost $50,000 ($1.79 million in 2025 dollars) to build and seats around 2000 people.

The tabernacle was dedicated September 15, 1889, by LDS Church president Wilford Woodruff. It was planned to be dedicated in 1888, but a fire partially destroyed the interior, and it had to be restored. In 1972, the tabernacle was added to the National Register of Historic Places. The tabernacle was refurbished in 2004 and 2005 and continues to operate as a meeting place for the Bear Lake Stake congregations and community.

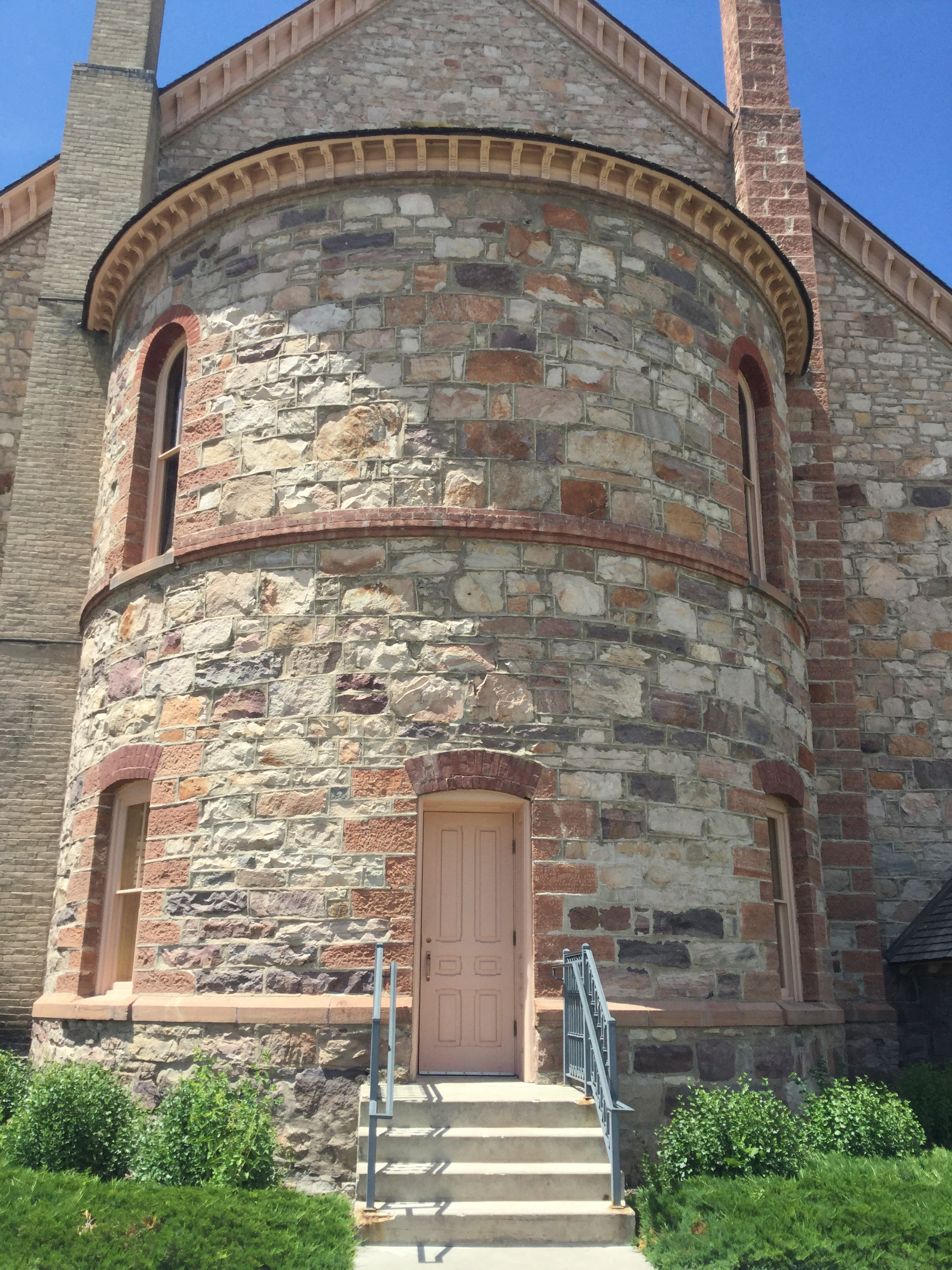
Vestry on the Paris Idaho Tabernacle. Vestries are rare in the LDS Church, because special clothes are not worn by bishops or stake presidents. The architect had studied churches in Europe and kept the vestry for architectural completeness, rather than for functionality.

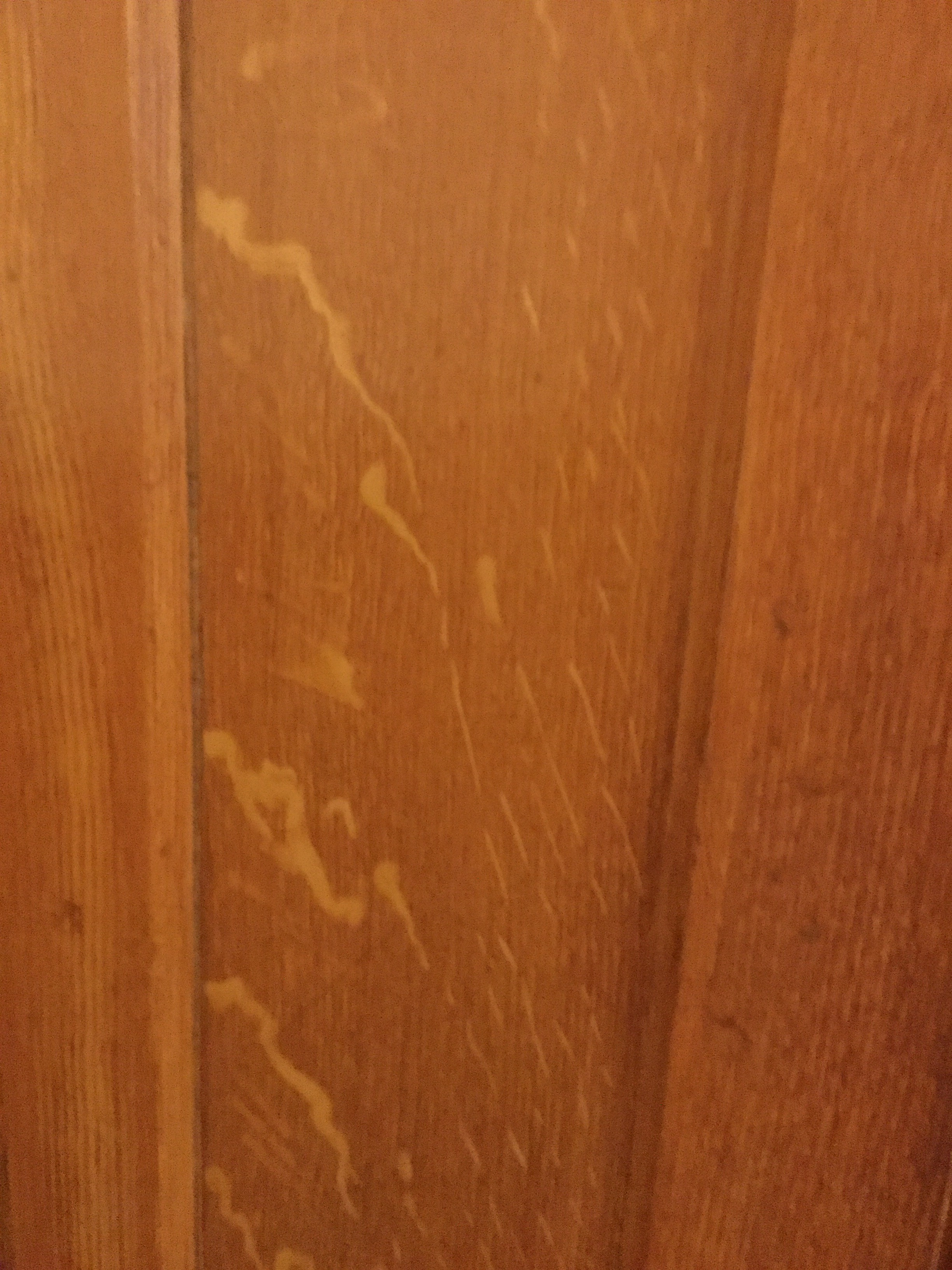
Door where the wood grain had been painted. This is a unique feature of the building, with all its pews, pillars and wooden molding having hand painted wood grain.

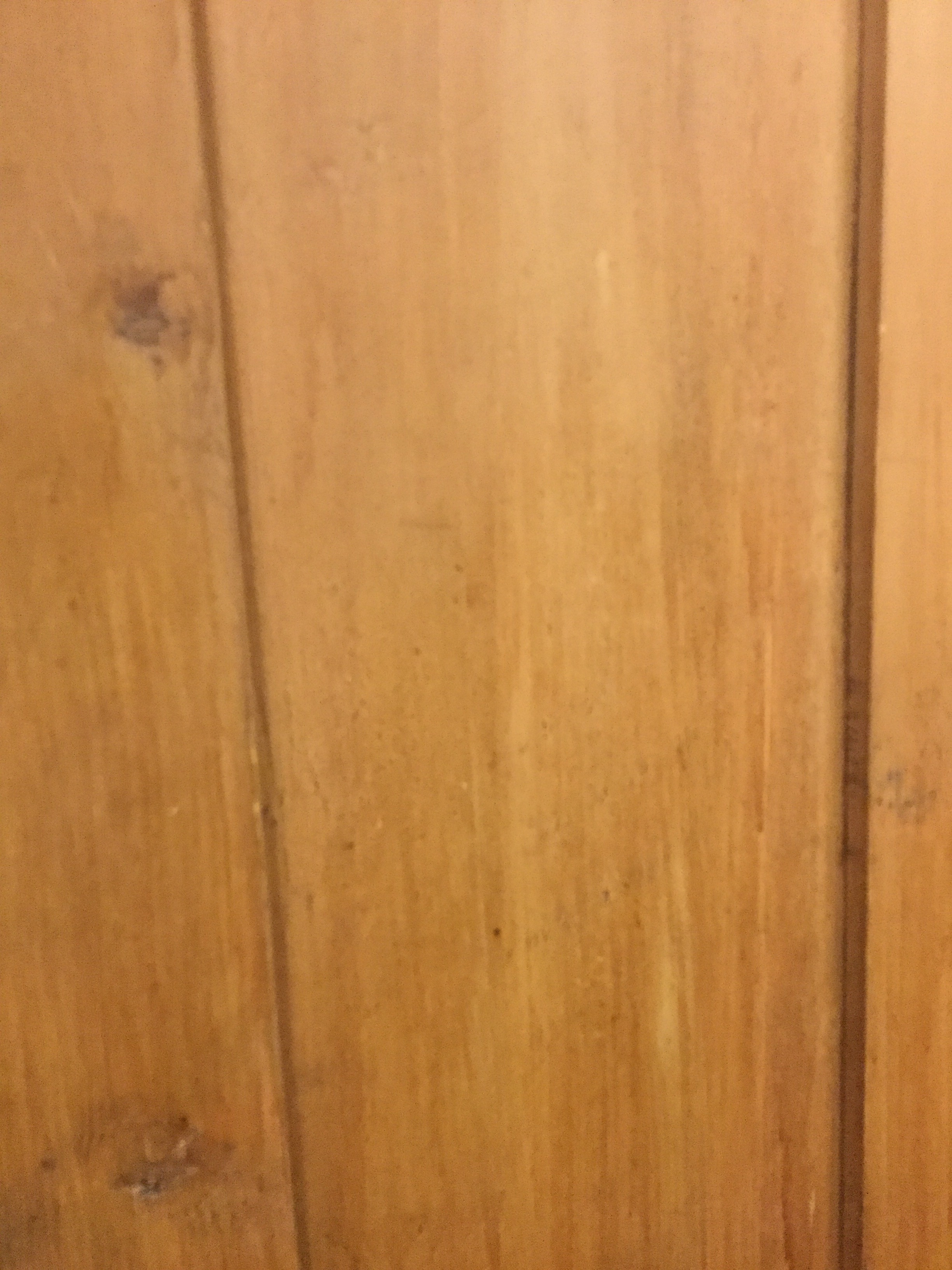
Interior of door where the wood grain has not been painted. This part of a closet is not in view of the public and shows what the wood looked like before grain was painted on.

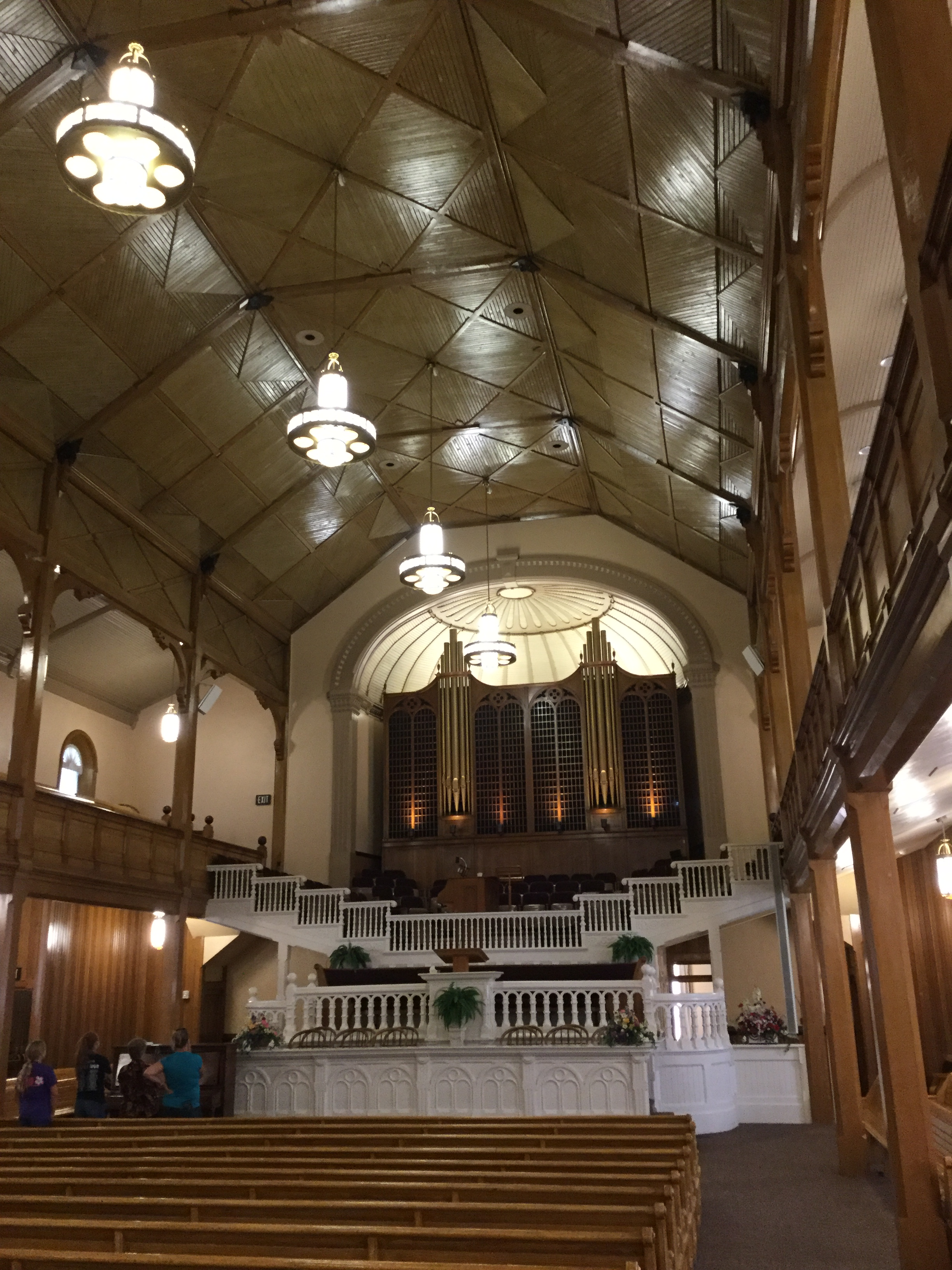
Interior of the tabernacle

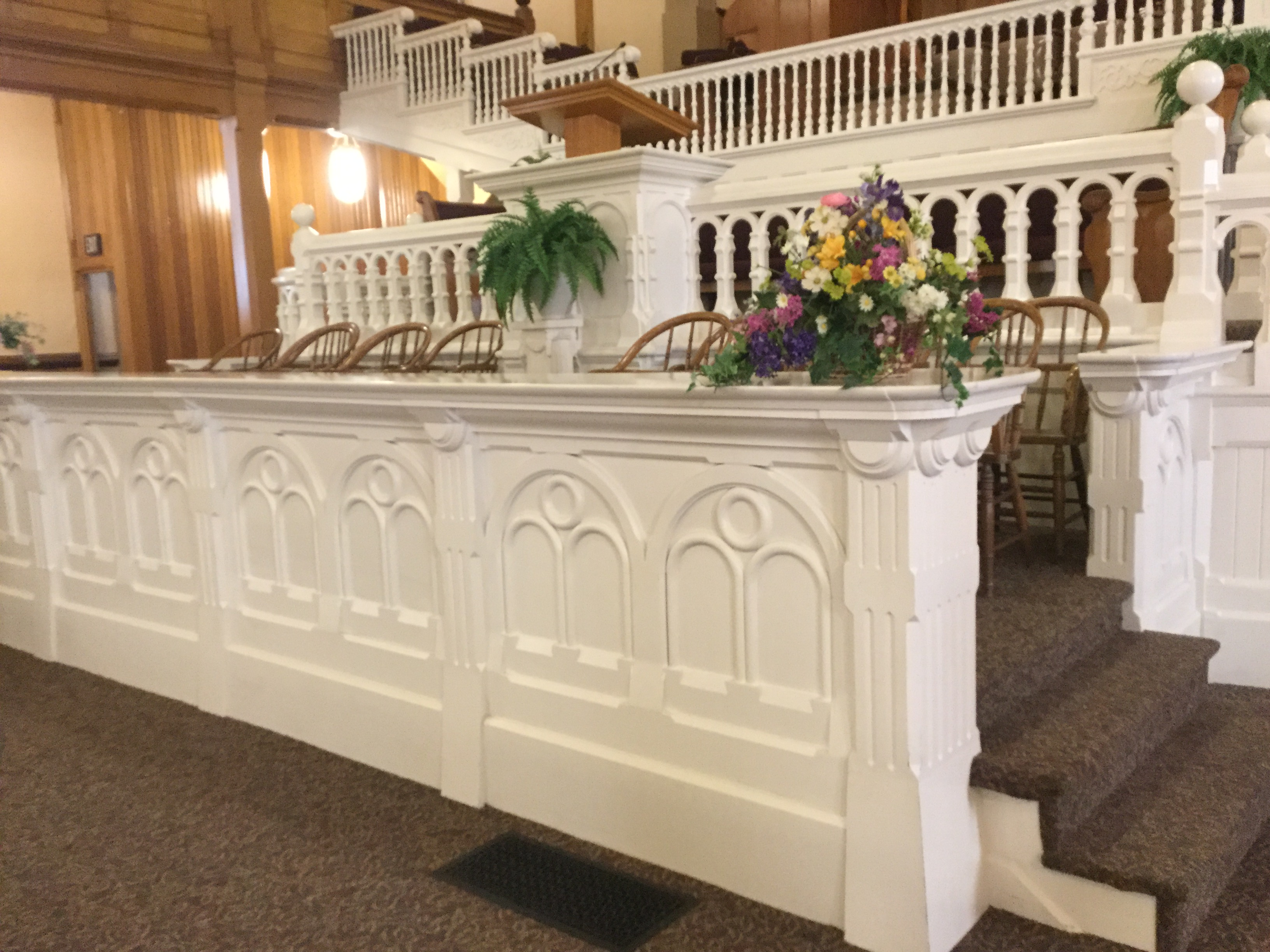
Stand area in the tabernacle. All woodwork was hand done. This area burnt in 1887, and had to be re-done, delaying the dedication.

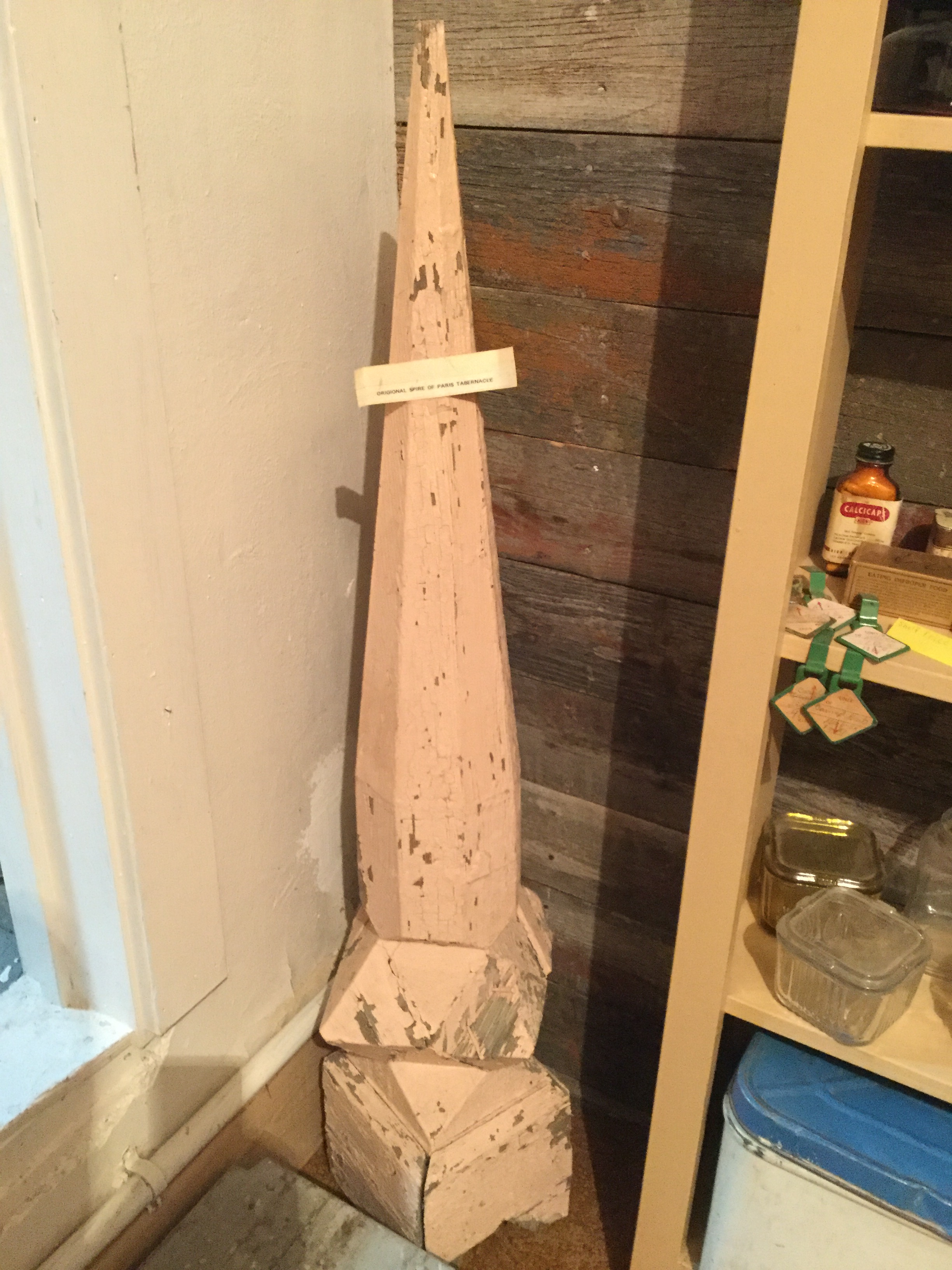
Original Spire from the tabernacle, located in the Paris Historical Museum

== See also ==
- LDS Stake Office Building, also in Paris, Idaho and also NRHP-listed
