= Provo City Library =

Public library in Provo, Utah, United States

Provo Library at Academy Square

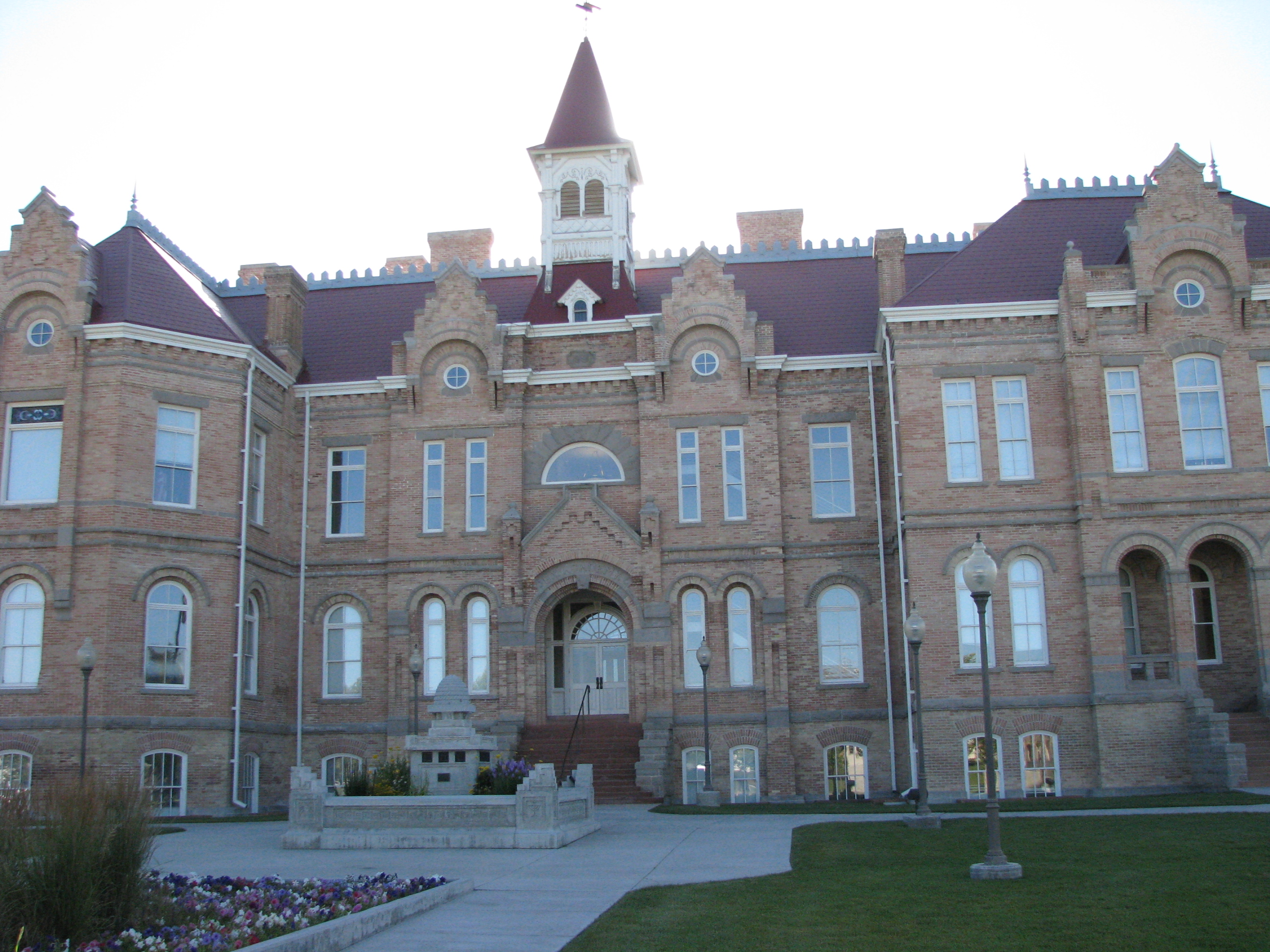
- Location: 550 North University Avenue; Provo, Utah 84601, United States
- Type: Public Library
- Established: 1905

Other information
- Director: Carla Gordon
- Website: http://www.provolibrary.org/
- Brigham Young Academy
- U.S. National Register of Historic Places
- U.S. Historic district
- Location within Utah
- Coordinates: 40°14′28″N 111°39′24″W
- Architect: Multiple
- Architectural style: Renaissance, Queen Anne, Educational
- NRHP reference No.: 76001839
- Added to NRHP: January 1, 1976

The Provo City Library is a public library serving residents of Provo and Orem in the U.S. state of Utah. It occupies the building of the former Brigham Young Academy, which was built in 1892. In 1976, the building was added to the National Register of Historic Places. After a remodeling process, it was rededicated as the Provo City Library on September 8, 2001.

== History of Library ==
Provo City Library was founded in 1905. It first opened in the basement of the Provo City courthouse in October of that year and operated until 1908. During its operation in the courthouse, it acquired 1,425 books donated by individuals in the community. Soon after that, the collection doubled to 3000 volumes by April 1908. On December 1, 1908, the library moved into a new building provided by a grant of $17,500 from Andrew Carnegie. Over the years, the library grew in size, by obtaining approximately 65,000 volumes and 125 periodical subscriptions.

In 1989, the library moved to another location, the City Center Building. Although it was bigger than before, it became inadequate within a couple of years.

In February 1997 a $16 million library bond passed which allowed the library to move to a bigger location. The bond helped preserve and renovate the historic Brigham Young Academy building, which the library then occupied. On July 9, 1999, city officials broke ground to initiate renovations for the new library. On September 8, 2001 the library began full operations.

== History of Academy Square ==
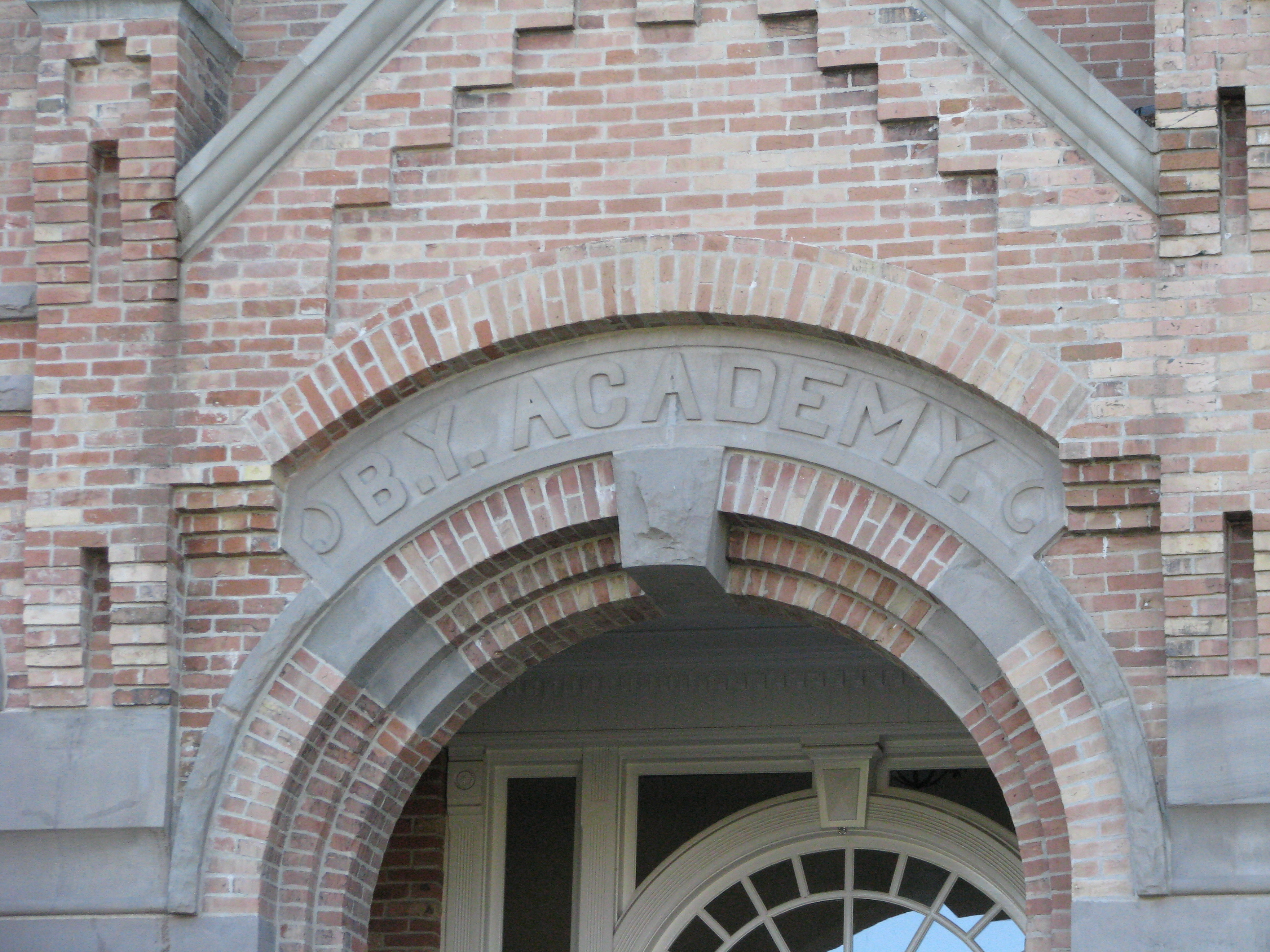
The library building was the site of Brigham Young Academy.

The Brigham Young Academy was one of the largest school buildings in the western Rocky Mountain region, and could accommodate 1,000 students. The Principal of the Academy, Karl G. Maeser, designed the building with the help of Don Carlos Young (son of Brigham Young) as architect. The Academy was located in Northern Provo. The name of the building has changed many times; in 1898, it was known as the High School Building, and in 1922 it was known as the Education Building, which it remained until 1968. The bell tower had no bell until 1912. Up until then a triangle hanging in the main hall was struck to signal classes. Unfortunately, the bell installed in 1912 was of poor manufacture and had a very dull sound. In 1919 the old Provo Tabernacle was razed and the nickel bell cast by the McShane Bell Foundry in Baltimore was installed in the Academy bell tower. The Brigham Young Academy would later become Brigham Young University.

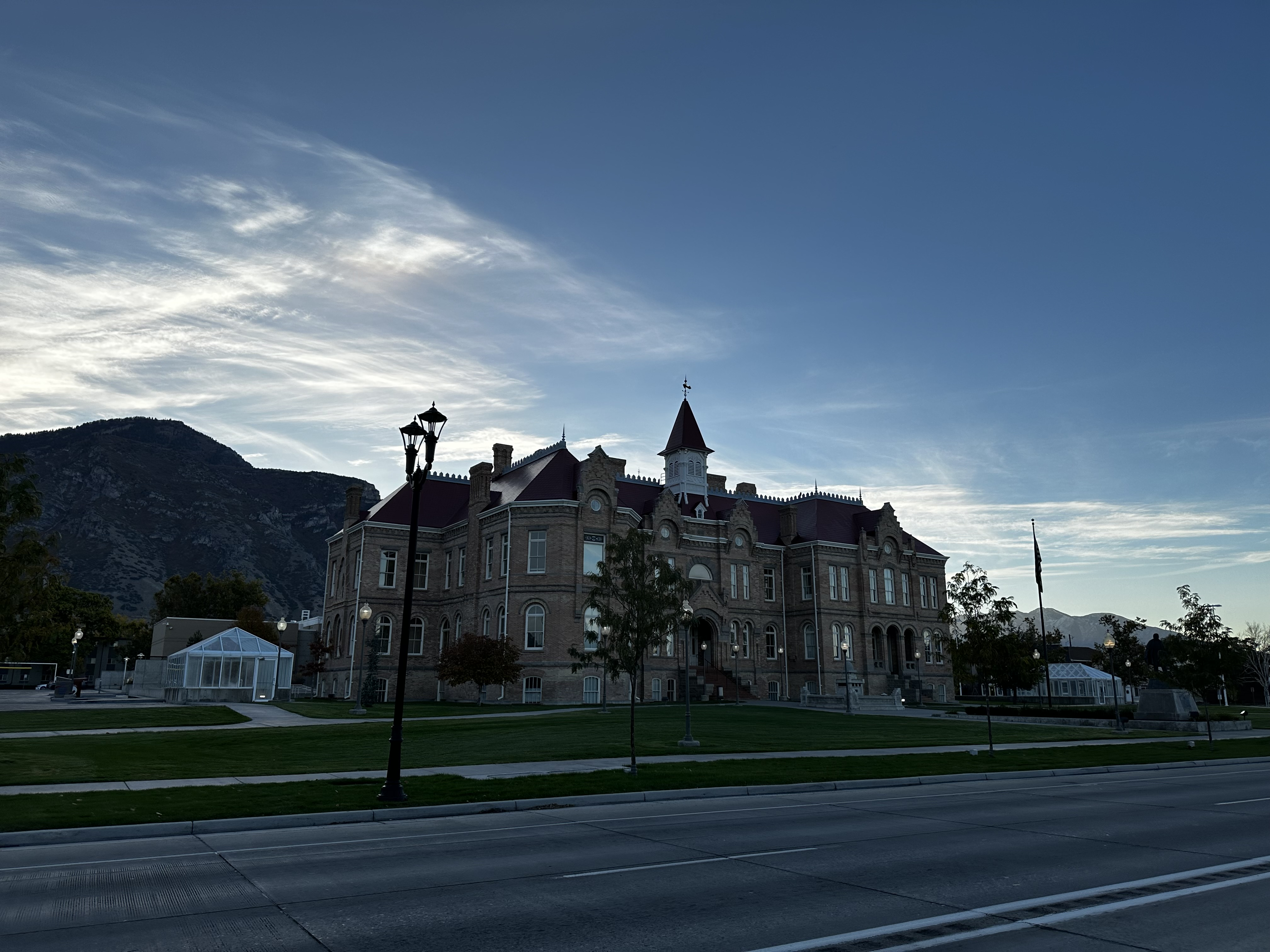
The Provo Library early in the morning

For the next 20 years, Academy Square remained vacant and slowly began to deteriorate. While real estate developers were eager to tear down the dilapidated buildings, Provo residents supported the preservation of the historic site. In 1997, a municipal bond and private donations financed the renovation of the Education Building; the other three buildings on Academy Square were demolished to make room for a parking garage. Fundraising and restoration efforts were spearheaded by BYU professor L. Douglas Smoot, who gained the moniker "the man who saved Academy Square." The groundbreaking ceremony occurred on July 9, 1999, and the Academy Building was rededicated as the Provo City Library on Sept. 8, 2001.

== Facts ==
There are almost 285,000 books, magazines, and media in circulation available to Provo Library cardholders at the Provo City Library. The checkout period for all items is three weeks. Accounts are limited to 250 items at a time, which includes books, magazines, CDs, DVDs, and other specialty items; however, there is no limit on the number of each kind of item. All items are renewable twice as long as there is no one on the waiting list for that specific item.

The library hosts many events and programs for the community:

- The Teen and Adult Summer Reading Program and Children's Summer Reading Program encourage young people to read throughout the summer months.
- AuthorLink brings exciting, well-known authors to present at the Provo Library. Local and national authors are featured and have included Brandon Sanderson, Gene Luen Yang, Ally Condie, Cressida Cowell, Marissa Meyer, and Markus Zusak.
- Fairy Tea is a popular formal tea party where young girls (and some adults) dress up as fairies. While some view it as a "mother-daughter" event (given the theme), fathers, brothers, and others are also welcome. The only limitations are that all guests must be over the age of 3, wear a fairy costume or Sunday best, and be in possession of a ticket. Tickets are sold a few weeks in advance. There is an initial "priority" sale to library cardholders; remaining tickets are offered to the general public a week later.
- Learn It is a monthly series of free classes about a variety of topics, offered in partnership with Utah State Extension Services and other community organizations.
- In 2014, the Library renovated a storage space to become The Attic at Academy Square. This exhibit space brings traveling exhibits from across the country; all exhibits are free and open to the public.
- In 2018, the Library opened the Basement Creative Lab, an audiovisual production studio available free to Provo residents.

== Location ==
Provo City Library is located on University Avenue and 550 North.

It was listed on the National Register of Historic Places in 1976 as Brigham Young Academy.
